= Call Me by Fire Vietnam season 1 =

Call Me by Fire Vietnam 2024
- Season 1
- Hosted by: Anh Tuấn; Khánh Vy
- No. of contestants: 33
- Winners: Bằng Kiều; Tự Long; Đinh Tiến Đạt; Tiến Luật; Đỗ Hoàng Hiệp; Thanh Duy; Quốc Thiên; Binz; Cường Seven; Jun Phạm; BB Trần; S.T Sơn Thạch; Rhymastic; (S)TRONG Trọng Hiếu; SOOBIN; Kay Trần; Bùi Công Nam
- No. of episodes: 15

Release
- Original network: VTV3
- Original release: June 29 – October 19, 2024

Season chronology
- Next → Season 2

The first season of Call Me by Fire Vietnam aired on VTV3 and YeaH1 Show YouTube channel from June 29 to October 19, 2024.

After the show, an "all-rounded family" was created, composed of the final 17 contestants of the show, being: Bằng Kiều, Tự Long, Đinh Tiến Đạt, Tiến Luật, Đỗ Hoàng Hiệp, Thanh Duy, Quốc Thiên, Binz, Cường Seven, Jun Phạm, BB Trần, S.T Sơn Thạch, Rhymastic, (S)TRONG Trọng Hiếu, SOOBIN, Kay Trần, and Bùi Công Nam.

== Production history ==
On January 25, 2024, the producers have announced the production for the Vietnamese adaptation of Call Me By Fire, originally produced by Mango TV on the Sisters Who Make Waves Vietnam's social media pages.

From June 23 (about a week before airing), the producers announced the show's logo, official teaser and the show's theme song's music video trailer. At June 28th, the show's official theme song, titled "Hỏa ca" (Fire song), was released.

The show had organized a press release meeting on June 26 at Ho Chi Minh city, with all of the cast (excluding Tự Long due to his personal schedule) participated, alongside with some guests. In the meeting, the show's producers' representative had announced that the show's mission is not to find the members for a girl group like Sisters Who Make Waves. Instead, the show wants to find the member for a "talented family", also known as the winning contestants. The producers wants this to be a beautiful journey with meaningful ending, and do not force the contestants to perform with each other after the show ended.

To address the concern about the result of in studio audience does not represent the majority of the public, the producers' representative had said that the result is audited by a third-party company for fairness, alongside stating that the studio audience's votes only had effect at the moment, and do not represent the general audience.

== Main backstage crews and hosts ==
Main host: Anh Tuấn

Backstage host: Khánh Vy

Stage director: Đinh Hà Uyên Thư

Music director: SlimV

Stage light director: Long Kenji

Content advisor: Đặng Thiếu Ngân

Stage visual director: Trần Quốc Vương

Mascot operator and outside activities host: Quỳnh Lương

== List of "talented brothers" ==
A total of 33 male artists (dubbed as "talented brothers") was announced during April and May of 2024. Majority of the casts are 30 years old or older, with a few of them are near the age of 30 when participated in the show. Through the producers' insight, a couple of factor when determining the cast are: their accomplishment, talents, intelligence, leadership abilities and a great mental mindset to "overcome obstacles". All of the "talented brothers" have to go through the process of training and preparing to compete in the performance rounds. After six performance rounds, the show then determined the winning brothers to be in the final "all-rounded family"

The list contained the identity of all 33 "talented brothers" and their final outcome in the show.

- ALL-ROUNDED FAMILY They successfully joined the final "All-rounded family"
- TOP 23 They are one of the finalists, but did not made it to the final lineup
- ELIMINATED They were eliminated before the finale

Talented brother	Occupation	Year of birth	Years since debut	Final result
Bằng Kiều	Singer	1973	35	ALL-ROUNDED FAMILY
Tự Long	Chèo performer/Actor	1973	25	ALL-ROUNDED FAMILY
Đinh Tiến Đạt	Singer-songwriter/Rapper/Dancer/Businessman	1981	29	ALL-ROUNDED FAMILY
Tiến Luật	Actor	1982	25	ALL-ROUNDED FAMILY
Đỗ Hoàng Hiệp	Singer-songwriter	1986	28	ALL-ROUNDED FAMILY
Thanh Duy	Singer-songwriter	1986	17	ALL-ROUNDED FAMILY
Quốc Thiên	Singer	1988	16	ALL-ROUNDED FAMILY
Binz	Singer-songwriter/Rapper	1988	14	ALL-ROUNDED FAMILY
Cường Seven	Singer/Dancer/Actor	1989	14	ALL-ROUNDED FAMILY
Jun Phạm	Singer/Actor	1989	14	ALL-ROUNDED FAMILY
BB Trần	Actor	1990	15	ALL-ROUNDED FAMILY
S.T Sơn Thạch	Singer/Dancer/Actor	1990	25	ALL-ROUNDED FAMILY
Rhymastic	Singer-songwriter/Rapper/Music producer	1991	15	ALL-ROUNDED FAMILY
(S)TRONG Trọng Hiếu	Singer-songwriter/Dancer	1992	9	ALL-ROUNDED FAMILY
SOOBIN	Singer-songwriter	1992	14	ALL-ROUNDED FAMILY
Bùi Công Nam	Singer-songwriter	1993	7	ALL-ROUNDED FAMILY
Kay Trần	Singer/Rapper/Dancer	1994	10	ALL-ROUNDED FAMILY
Phan Đinh Tùng	Singer-songwriter	1976	25	FINAL 23
Tuấn Hưng	Singer	1978	29	FINAL 23
Hà Lê	Singer-songwriter/Rapper/Dancer	1984	20	FINAL 23
Thiên Minh	Photographer	1990	16	FINAL 23
Kiên Ứng	Director	1992	14	FINAL 23
Duy Khánh	Actor/Host	1995	16	FINAL 23
Trương Thế Vinh	Singer/Actor	1984	22	ELIMINATED (5TH PERFORMANCE ROUND)
Tăng Phúc	Singer	1990	7	ELIMINATED (5TH PERFORMANCE ROUND)
Liên Bỉnh Phát	Actor	1990	7	ELIMINATED (5TH PERFORMANCE ROUND)
Phạm Khánh Hưng	Singer-songwriter	1982	25	ELIMINATED (4TH PERFORMANCE ROUND)
Đăng Khôi	Singer	1983	20	ELIMINATED (4TH PERFORMANCE ROUND)
Nguyễn Trần Duy Nhất	Muay Thai athlete	1989	29	ELIMINATED (4TH PERFORMANCE ROUND)
Neko Lê	Rapper/Director	1990	15	ELIMINATED (4TH PERFORMANCE ROUND)
Hồng Sơn	Footballer	1970	35	ELIMINATED (3RD PERFORMANCE ROUND)
Thành Trung	Host/Actor	1983	21	ELIMINATED (2ND PERFORMANCE ROUND)
HuyR	Singer-songwriter	1995	9	ELIMINATED (2ND PERFORMANCE ROUND)

== Guests ==
Guests	Occupation	Roles	Episode of appearance
Hoàng Oanh	MC	Guest host	1, 2
Hương Ly	Singer	Guest host	1, 2
Diệp Lâm Anh	Singer/Dancer	Cooking portion judge	7
H'Hen Niê	Model/Pageant queen	Cooking portion judge	7
Nguyễn Việt Hùng	Tea artisan	Tea collecting portion judge	9
Hữu Quốc	Cải lương performer	Guest feature on "Dạ cổ hoài lang"	10
Thu Huyền	Chèo performer	Guest feature on "Đào liễu"	10
Anh Tấn	Hue court music performer	Guest feature on "Mưa trên phố Huế"	10
Hồ Nga	Hue court music performer	Guest feature on "Mưa trên phố Huế"	10
Mặt Trời Đỏ	Hue court music performing group	Guest feature on "Mưa trên phố Huế"	10
Đinh Nhật Minh	Flute artist	Guest feature on "Chiếc khăn piêu"	10
Noo Phước Thịnh	Singer	Guest performers at the finale	14
LUNAS (Note: LUNAS is composed of members: Trang Pháp, Diệp Lâm Anh, Huyền Baby, Khổng Tú Quỳnh, Ninh Dương Lan Ngọc)	Musical group	Guest performers at the finale	14
Mỹ Mỹ	Singer/Dancer	Guest feature on "Em còn nhớ anh không?"	15

== Show's content ==
=== Premiere Concert: Who am I? ===
Prior to the performance round, every brother would have to perform in a concert. All 33 of them were divided into eight groups with three, four, or five members that are predetermined by the producers through three main factors: synergy, contrast and support. For a group, each brother would perform a solo performance and a group performance. They only have 48 hours to prepare for the performance. After each group's performance, 350 in-studio audience would vote for their favorite brother. The member with the highest vote would receive a 300 extra individual firepoints. At the end of the show, the audience would vote for three of their favorite brothers to compose their individual firepoints, with a vote representing 10 firepoints.

Hoang Oanh and Huong Ly, two artists from the first season of the Vietnamese version of "Sisters Who Make Waves", are the guest hosts for this concert.

First stage
Performance order	Group name (English translation)	Individual performance order	Members	Individual song [English translation](Composer)	Group song [English translation] (Composer)	Voting score	Additional firepower points	Individual firepower points
Episode 1 (June 29th, 2024)
1	Anh tài huyền thoại (Legendary brothers)	1	Tuấn Hưng	"Quả táo vàng" [Golden apple] (Phúc Bồ)	"Quê hương tuổi thơ tôi" & "Nếu có yêu tôi" [My childhood's hometown & If you love me] (Từ Huy, Trần Duy Đức, Ngô Tịnh Yên)	1260	300	480
1	Anh tài huyền thoại (Legendary brothers)	2	Bằng Kiều	"Hè muộn" [Late summer] (Bằng Kiều)	"Quê hương tuổi thơ tôi" & "Nếu có yêu tôi" [My childhood's hometown & If you love me] (Từ Huy, Trần Duy Đức, Ngô Tịnh Yên)	470	0	130
1	Anh tài huyền thoại (Legendary brothers)	3	Tự Long	"Tình đất" [Love of the land] (Tuấn Phương)	"Quê hương tuổi thơ tôi" & "Nếu có yêu tôi" [My childhood's hometown & If you love me] (Từ Huy, Trần Duy Đức, Ngô Tịnh Yên)	830	0	160
1	Anh tài huyền thoại (Legendary brothers)	4	Hồng Sơn	"Niềm tin chiến thắng" [Victory belief] (Lê Quang)	"Quê hương tuổi thơ tôi" & "Nếu có yêu tôi" [My childhood's hometown & If you love me] (Từ Huy, Trần Duy Đức, Ngô Tịnh Yên)	390	0	130
2	Nam thần rực lửa (Fiery brothers)	5	Kay Trần	"Đường vào tim em" [Way to your heart] (Phúc Bồ, Wokeup)	"Nước hoa" [Perfume] (Hoàng Tôn, Melyd K)	1100	0	520
2	Nam thần rực lửa (Fiery brothers)	6	SOOBIN	"Giá như" [If] (SOOBIN, SlimV)	"Nước hoa" [Perfume] (Hoàng Tôn, Melyd K)	1190	300	780
2	Nam thần rực lửa (Fiery brothers)	7	Cường Seven	"Quên lối về" [Forgot the way back] (Cường Seven, Doesn't K, Quân R.E.V, APJ, Touliver)	"Nước hoa" [Perfume] (Hoàng Tôn, Melyd K)	440	0	230
2	Nam thần rực lửa (Fiery brothers)	8	Kiên Ứng	"Diamond" (Lil Wuyn)	"Nước hoa" [Perfume] (Hoàng Tôn, Melyd K)	230	0	260
3	Anh tài sục sôi (Boiling brothers)	9	Phan Đinh Tùng	"Bởi vì anh yêu em" [Because I love you] (Phan Đinh Tùng)	"Đón bình minh" [Catch the sunrise] (Khắc Hưng)	1390	300	440
3	Anh tài sục sôi (Boiling brothers)	10	Thành Trung	"Chiếc khăn gió ấm" [Warm scarf] (Nguyễn Văn Chung)	"Đón bình minh" [Catch the sunrise] (Khắc Hưng)	1050	0	80
3	Anh tài sục sôi (Boiling brothers)	11	Đỗ Hoàng Hiệp	"Trống vắng" [Empty] (Quốc Hùng)	"Đón bình minh" [Catch the sunrise] (Khắc Hưng)	520	0	100
Episode 2 (July 6th, 2024)
4	Anh tài bí ẩn (Mystery brothers)	12	(S)TRONG Trọng Hiếu	"Rise Up" ((S)TRONG Trọng Hiếu, Scott Quinn, Ningyuan Jiang, Samuel Dick)	"Người lạ ơi" [Oh strangers](Châu Đăng Khoa, Neko Lê, Pjpo, (S)TRONG Trọng Hiếu)	300	0	230
4	Anh tài bí ẩn (Mystery brothers)	13	S.T Sơn Thạch	"Thật xa thật gần" [So far so close] (Andiez)	"Người lạ ơi" [Oh strangers](Châu Đăng Khoa, Neko Lê, Pjpo, (S)TRONG Trọng Hiếu)	810	0	450
4	Anh tài bí ẩn (Mystery brothers)	14	Thanh Duy	"Tình anh bán chiếu" [My love only for selling mats] (Thanh Duy)	"Người lạ ơi" [Oh strangers](Châu Đăng Khoa, Neko Lê, Pjpo, (S)TRONG Trọng Hiếu)	460	0	250
4	Anh tài bí ẩn (Mystery brothers)	15	BB Trần	"Cánh hồng phai" [Faded rose petals] (Dương Khắc Linh, Hoàng Huy Long)	"Người lạ ơi" [Oh strangers](Châu Đăng Khoa, Neko Lê, Pjpo, (S)TRONG Trọng Hiếu)	880	300	880
4	Anh tài bí ẩn (Mystery brothers)	16	Neko Lê	"Yêu em dại khờ" [Love you foolish] (Nguyên Jenda, Neko Lê)	"Người lạ ơi" [Oh strangers](Châu Đăng Khoa, Neko Lê, Pjpo, (S)TRONG Trọng Hiếu)	510	0	380
5	Anh tài nham thạch (Lava brothers)	17	Binz	"Men Cry" (Binz)	"Khiến nó ngầu" [Make it cool](Đinh Tiến Đạt, Binz, Rhymastic, Kriss Ngô)	1290	300	710
5	Anh tài nham thạch (Lava brothers)	18	Rhymastic	"Lặng" [Silence] (Rhymastic)	"Khiến nó ngầu" [Make it cool](Đinh Tiến Đạt, Binz, Rhymastic, Kriss Ngô)	970	0	330
5	Anh tài nham thạch (Lava brothers)	19	Đinh Tiến Đạt	"Tặng anh cho cô ấy" [Give you to her](Hứa Kim Tuyền, Hương Giang)	"Khiến nó ngầu" [Make it cool](Đinh Tiến Đạt, Binz, Rhymastic, Kriss Ngô)	340	0	210
5	Anh tài nham thạch (Lava brothers)	20	Hà Lê	"Quay lại giường đi em" [Go back to bed](Khắc Hưng, Hà Lê)	"Khiến nó ngầu" [Make it cool](Đinh Tiến Đạt, Binz, Rhymastic, Kriss Ngô)	330	0	160
6	Thanh xuân học đường (School's youth)	21	Quốc Thiên	"Hơn 1000 năm sau" & "Chia cách bình yên" [After 1000 years & Separated peace] (Trịnh Đình Quang, Tiên Cookie)	"Sóng tình" [Love wave](Tuấn Khanh, Keepitlowkey)	1390	300	540
6	Thanh xuân học đường (School's youth)	22	Phạm Khánh Hưng	"Biết làm sao để quên em" & "Không cần phải hứa đâu em" [How can I forget you & No need to promise] (Phạm Khánh Hưng)	"Sóng tình" [Love wave](Tuấn Khanh, Keepitlowkey)	550	0	140
6	Thanh xuân học đường (School's youth)	23	Đăng Khôi	"Cô bé mùa đông" & "Thương thương thương, yêu yêu yêu" [Winter girl & Adore adore adore, love love love] (Phạm Toàn Thắng, Lê Bá Vĩnh)	"Sóng tình" [Love wave](Tuấn Khanh, Keepitlowkey)	1150	0	220
7	Anh tài đa sắc (Multicolored brothers)	24	Duy Khánh	"Think of You" (Thu Thủy, Pháo)	"Anh nhà ở đâu thế?" [Where is your house?] (Lyly, B Ray, TDK)	710	0	440
7	Anh tài đa sắc (Multicolored brothers)	25	Tăng Phúc	"Đừng chờ anh nữa" [Don't wait for me] (Huỳnh Quốc Huy, Tony Việt)	"Anh nhà ở đâu thế?" [Where is your house?] (Lyly, B Ray, TDK)	480	0	190
7	Anh tài đa sắc (Multicolored brothers)	26	Bùi Công Nam	"Chúa tể" [Lord] (Bùi Công Nam)	"Anh nhà ở đâu thế?" [Where is your house?] (Lyly, B Ray, TDK)	460	0	220
7	Anh tài đa sắc (Multicolored brothers)	27	HuyR	"Cô gái M52" & "Anh thanh niên" [1m52 girl & Young man](HuyR, Tùng Viu)	"Anh nhà ở đâu thế?" [Where is your house?] (Lyly, B Ray, TDK)	230	0	130
7	Anh tài đa sắc (Multicolored brothers)	28	Jun Phạm	"Tân thời" [New era] (Huỳnh Hiền Năng)	"Anh nhà ở đâu thế?" [Where is your house?] (Lyly, B Ray, TDK)	1170	300	850
8	Quý ông đa tình (Sentimental gentlemen)	29	Thiên Minh	"Cho em" & "Đôi mắt" [For you & Pair of eyes] (Wanbi Tuấn Anh, Nguyễn Hải Phong)	"Phía sau một cô gái" [Behind a girl](Tiên Cookie)	470	0	260
8	Quý ông đa tình (Sentimental gentlemen)	30	Tiến Luật	"Tình anh là đại dương" [My love is the ocean] (Duy Mạnh)	"Phía sau một cô gái" [Behind a girl](Tiên Cookie)	960	300	760
8	Quý ông đa tình (Sentimental gentlemen)	31	Trương Thế Vinh	"Cánh hoa vụt mất" [Lost petal] (Phạm Việt Hoàng)	"Phía sau một cô gái" [Behind a girl](Tiên Cookie)	530	0	370
8	Quý ông đa tình (Sentimental gentlemen)	32	Liên Bỉnh Phát	"Từng yêu" [Used to love] (Nguyễn Đình Dũng)	"Phía sau một cô gái" [Behind a girl](Tiên Cookie)	680	0	250
8	Quý ông đa tình (Sentimental gentlemen)	33	Nguyễn Trần Duy Nhất	"Vì anh thương em (Vô cùng)" [Because I love you (Extremely)] (Võ Hoài Phúc, Huỳnh Tuấn Anh)	"Phía sau một cô gái" [Behind a girl](Tiên Cookie)	440	0	200
Special	33 talented brothers			"Hỏa ca - Call Me by Fire" [Fire song - Call Me by Fire] (It's CHARLES., Touliver, GRVITY, Tinle, SlimV)				

- Score of the winning "talented brother"

=== First performance round: The teenager back then ===
For the first performance round, the brothers would have to form houses for the performance. The process of forming the houses are as follow:

- Pairing: Two brothers would form a duo. The eight duos that form and advance to the ceremony room the fastest would form a house. The duo that advances to the ceremony room earlier would have priority choosing the members.
- Recruiting: When all eight houses had the first two members (being the duo), those two members would go back to the main area and proceed to recruit the remaining members. The brothers that accept to join the house must sign an agreement titled "House forming agreement".
- Leader choosing: After finishing the house's lineup, each house would choose a house's captain. The eight captains for this performance round are: Bằng Kiều (Spring, summer, autumn, winter house), Phan Đinh Tùng (KK house), Đinh Tiến Đạt (Resurrection house), Thành Trung (Theater house), Cường Seven (Bright stars house), Jun Phạm (Five onions house), (S)TRONG Trọng Hiếu (Passion house) and Duy Khánh (Cactus house)

After finishing the lineup, the cast then choose the song for their house's performance, through the process of auctioning. The process are as follow:

1. Points dividing: Each house would go to the "fire safe" to receive the house's firepower points in secrecy. After that, they would discuss how many points they want to use for auctioning, and how much points they want to save. The points that are being taken out for auctioning could not be placed back into the saving fund.
2. Setting the starting price: After dividing the points, each house would choose two of their favorite songs and put a starting price on each of the song, with the number must be within the auctioning points limit. In the case of multiple houses wanting a specific song, the house that have the highest starting price would have that amount being the starting price for the song. This process must be done in private.
3. Public bidding: From the determined starting price, the houses would do the auctioning process. Whichever house bidded the highest number of points would win the song.

Each house could also remake at most 50% of the song, with the remaking part being called "X-Part". For the first performance round, the houses would perform their song. After each performance, the in-studio audience have one minute to vote for the houses (or switch their votes). Each audience could vote for a maximum of three houses. After all of the performances are done, each audience would vote for a maximum of three talented brothers to make up their individual firepoints.

According to the final voting score, six highest-voting houses would be automatically safe and move on to the next round, while the remaining two houses are in the danger zone. They must transfer one of the members (excluding the captain) to another house. If the transferring member successfully convinced one of the safe houses to accept them in and transfer 150 firepower points to the danger houses, the transferring process are deemed successfully. If there are two or more houses wants to have them in their house, the decision to join which house are determined by the transferring member. If they could not convince any house to recruit them, they must return to their original house and choose one member in their house to be eliminated.

At the end of the first performance round, the Passion house and the Theater house was the two danger houses, resulted in the transfer of members. Tuấn Hưng chose to join the Bright stars house and Quốc Thiên chose to join the Resurrection house. Because both of the transfers were successful, no brothers are eliminated in this round.

Episode 4 - First performance round (July 27th, 2024) (Note: Episode 4 was delayed to air a week after the original date to allow for the airing of the national funeral of the Vietnamese's General Secretary Nguyễn Phú Trọng)
Performance order	House's name [English translation]	Performance song [English translation] (Composers)	Members	Original score	Final score	Individual result
1	Đam mê [Passion house]	"Ba kể con nghe" & "Dưới ánh đèn sân khấu" [Dad tell, child listen & Under the stage lights] (Nguyễn Hải Phong, Hứa Kim Tuyền, It's CHARLES., (S)TRONG Trọng Hiếu)	Tuấn Hưng	2330	760	Advanced
1	Đam mê [Passion house]	"Ba kể con nghe" & "Dưới ánh đèn sân khấu" [Dad tell, child listen & Under the stage lights] (Nguyễn Hải Phong, Hứa Kim Tuyền, It's CHARLES., (S)TRONG Trọng Hiếu)	Nguyễn Trần Duy Nhất (Note: During the filming of the house choosing process, Duy Nhất was absent due to his schedule to prepare for the ONE Championship. Because of such, his house for the 1st performance round was determined by the producers. The producers have placed him in the Passion house)	2330	760	Advanced
1	Đam mê [Passion house]	"Ba kể con nghe" & "Dưới ánh đèn sân khấu" [Dad tell, child listen & Under the stage lights] (Nguyễn Hải Phong, Hứa Kim Tuyền, It's CHARLES., (S)TRONG Trọng Hiếu)	Liên Bỉnh Phát	2330	760	Advanced
1	Đam mê [Passion house]	"Ba kể con nghe" & "Dưới ánh đèn sân khấu" [Dad tell, child listen & Under the stage lights] (Nguyễn Hải Phong, Hứa Kim Tuyền, It's CHARLES., (S)TRONG Trọng Hiếu)	(S)TRONG Trọng Hiếu	2330	760	Advanced
2	Hát [Theater]	"Một lần dang dở" & "Đi qua cầu vồng" [An unfinished moment & Passing by the rainbow] (Nhật Ngân, Mặc Thế Nhân, Phúc Bồ, Rick, Hà Lê, Đỗ Hoàng Hiệp, Kiên Ứng)	Thành Trung	1970	650	Advanced
2	Hát [Theater]	"Một lần dang dở" & "Đi qua cầu vồng" [An unfinished moment & Passing by the rainbow] (Nhật Ngân, Mặc Thế Nhân, Phúc Bồ, Rick, Hà Lê, Đỗ Hoàng Hiệp, Kiên Ứng)	Hà Lê	1970	650	Advanced
2	Hát [Theater]	"Một lần dang dở" & "Đi qua cầu vồng" [An unfinished moment & Passing by the rainbow] (Nhật Ngân, Mặc Thế Nhân, Phúc Bồ, Rick, Hà Lê, Đỗ Hoàng Hiệp, Kiên Ứng)	Đỗ Hoàng Hiệp	1970	650	Advanced
2	Hát [Theater]	"Một lần dang dở" & "Đi qua cầu vồng" [An unfinished moment & Passing by the rainbow] (Nhật Ngân, Mặc Thế Nhân, Phúc Bồ, Rick, Hà Lê, Đỗ Hoàng Hiệp, Kiên Ứng)	Quốc Thiên	1970	650	Advanced
2	Hát [Theater]	"Một lần dang dở" & "Đi qua cầu vồng" [An unfinished moment & Passing by the rainbow] (Nhật Ngân, Mặc Thế Nhân, Phúc Bồ, Rick, Hà Lê, Đỗ Hoàng Hiệp, Kiên Ứng)	Kiên Ứng	1970	650	Advanced
3	Ngũ hành [Five onions]	"Vợ người ta" & "Chuyện ba người" [The other's wife & The story of three people] (Phan Mạnh Quỳnh, Quốc Dũng, HuyR)	Phạm Khánh Hưng	2470	1660	Advanced
3	Ngũ hành [Five onions]	"Vợ người ta" & "Chuyện ba người" [The other's wife & The story of three people] (Phan Mạnh Quỳnh, Quốc Dũng, HuyR)	Trương Thế Vinh	2470	1660	Advanced
3	Ngũ hành [Five onions]	"Vợ người ta" & "Chuyện ba người" [The other's wife & The story of three people] (Phan Mạnh Quỳnh, Quốc Dũng, HuyR)	Jun Phạm	2470	1660	Advanced
3	Ngũ hành [Five onions]	"Vợ người ta" & "Chuyện ba người" [The other's wife & The story of three people] (Phan Mạnh Quỳnh, Quốc Dũng, HuyR)	BB Trần	2470	1660	Advanced
3	Ngũ hành [Five onions]	"Vợ người ta" & "Chuyện ba người" [The other's wife & The story of three people] (Phan Mạnh Quỳnh, Quốc Dũng, HuyR)	HuyR	2470	1660	Advanced
4	Tái sinh [Resurrection]	"Lột xác" & "Chuyện nhỏ" [Transform & Little thing] (Nguyễn Hải Phong, Tuấn Khanh, Rhymastic)	Đinh Tiến Đạt	1580	900	Advanced
4	Tái sinh [Resurrection]	"Lột xác" & "Chuyện nhỏ" [Transform & Little thing] (Nguyễn Hải Phong, Tuấn Khanh, Rhymastic)	Tiến Luật	1580	900	Advanced
4	Tái sinh [Resurrection]	"Lột xác" & "Chuyện nhỏ" [Transform & Little thing] (Nguyễn Hải Phong, Tuấn Khanh, Rhymastic)	Rhymastic	1580	900	Advanced
5	Sao sáng [Bright stars]	"Trống cơm" [Rice drum] (Northern Vietnamese folk, It's CHARLES., APJ, SOOBIN, Touliver, Kriss Ngô)	Tự Long	1860	1490	Advanced
5	Sao sáng [Bright stars]	"Trống cơm" [Rice drum] (Northern Vietnamese folk, It's CHARLES., APJ, SOOBIN, Touliver, Kriss Ngô)	Cường Seven	1860	1490	Advanced
5	Sao sáng [Bright stars]	"Trống cơm" [Rice drum] (Northern Vietnamese folk, It's CHARLES., APJ, SOOBIN, Touliver, Kriss Ngô)	SOOBIN	1860	1490	Advanced
6	Xuân hạ thu đông [Spring summer autumn winter]	"Tỉnh thức sau giấc ngủ đông" [Awake after hibernation] (Kai Đinh, Grey D, TDK, Binz)	Hồng Sơn	1830	1680	Advanced
6	Xuân hạ thu đông [Spring summer autumn winter]	"Tỉnh thức sau giấc ngủ đông" [Awake after hibernation] (Kai Đinh, Grey D, TDK, Binz)	Bằng Kiều	1830	1680	Advanced
6	Xuân hạ thu đông [Spring summer autumn winter]	"Tỉnh thức sau giấc ngủ đông" [Awake after hibernation] (Kai Đinh, Grey D, TDK, Binz)	Binz	1830	1680	Advanced
6	Xuân hạ thu đông [Spring summer autumn winter]	"Tỉnh thức sau giấc ngủ đông" [Awake after hibernation] (Kai Đinh, Grey D, TDK, Binz)	S.T Sơn Thạch	1830	1680	Advanced
7	KK	"Dịu dàng đến từng phút giây" & "Bước đến bên em" [Gentle to the minute and second & Step over to you] (Lương Bằng Quang, Khắc Hưng, Neko Lê, Kay Trần)	Phan Đinh Tùng	1260	1060	Advanced
7	KK	"Dịu dàng đến từng phút giây" & "Bước đến bên em" [Gentle to the minute and second & Step over to you] (Lương Bằng Quang, Khắc Hưng, Neko Lê, Kay Trần)	Đăng Khôi	1260	1060	Advanced
7	KK	"Dịu dàng đến từng phút giây" & "Bước đến bên em" [Gentle to the minute and second & Step over to you] (Lương Bằng Quang, Khắc Hưng, Neko Lê, Kay Trần)	Neko Lê	1260	1060	Advanced
7	KK	"Dịu dàng đến từng phút giây" & "Bước đến bên em" [Gentle to the minute and second & Step over to you] (Lương Bằng Quang, Khắc Hưng, Neko Lê, Kay Trần)	Tăng Phúc	1260	1060	Advanced
7	KK	"Dịu dàng đến từng phút giây" & "Bước đến bên em" [Gentle to the minute and second & Step over to you] (Lương Bằng Quang, Khắc Hưng, Neko Lê, Kay Trần)	Kay Trần	1260	1060	Advanced
8	Xương rồng [Cactus]	"Áo mùa đông" & "Trở về" [Winter coat & Comeback] (Đỗ Nhuận, Dương Thụ, Bùi Công Nam)	Thanh Duy	1600	1750	Advanced
8	Xương rồng [Cactus]	"Áo mùa đông" & "Trở về" [Winter coat & Comeback] (Đỗ Nhuận, Dương Thụ, Bùi Công Nam)	Thiên Minh	1600	1750	Advanced
8	Xương rồng [Cactus]	"Áo mùa đông" & "Trở về" [Winter coat & Comeback] (Đỗ Nhuận, Dương Thụ, Bùi Công Nam)	Bùi Công Nam	1600	1750	Advanced
8	Xương rồng [Cactus]	"Áo mùa đông" & "Trở về" [Winter coat & Comeback] (Đỗ Nhuận, Dương Thụ, Bùi Công Nam)	Duy Khánh	1600	1750	Advanced

- The talented brother is the team captain
- Safe team's score

=== Second performance round: The message from the universe ===
For the second performance round, the brothers would have to form alliances, with each alliance consist of two houses of the previous round. Each house would discuss which other house they want to pair up with, then deal or convince other houses to pair up with them. After forming an alliance, they would name their alliance and choose their captain (they could either have a one big alliance captain, or a captain for each house in the alliance). There are four alliances in this round, being Cửu Long (Nine Dragons) alliance (consist of Ngũ hành (Five onions) house and Hát (Theatre) house), Phát tài (Get rich) alliance (consist of Xương rồng (Cactus) house and Xuân hạ thu đông (Spring summer autumn winter) house, Kame alliance (KK house and Đam mê (Passion) house) and Tinh tú (Constellations) alliance (consist of Tái sinh (Resurrection) house and Sao sáng (Bright star) house). The four alliance captains of this round are: Bằng Kiều (Phát tài alliance), Đinh Tiến Đạt (Tinh tú alliance), Jun Phạm (Cửu Long alliance) and Kay Trần (Kame alliance).

The process of choosing the songs is similar to the previous round, except that each alliance would have to perform two songs, with one being a vocal-focused song and one being a performance-focused song.

The rules for the second performance round are as follow: each alliance would perform two songs in two different rounds, with each alliance would determine to themselves what song to perform in what round. They may also have the freedom to assign the members to perform in which song, but they must meet the two requirements: Each member must perform at least one song, and each song may only be performed by a maximum six members. After the conclusion of each round, the in-studio audience would vote for two of their favorite performances. At the end of the whole performance round, they would also vote for three of their favorite brothers to make up their individual firepower points. The alliance with the least total score from the two performances would be the only danger alliance, with the other three alliances being safe from elimination. The danger alliance would have to discuss within the group to eliminate three members (that are not the three brothers with the highest individual firepower points in the alliance) from the competition. At the end of the second performance round, the Cửu Long alliance is the danger alliance, with the three members they chose to eliminate are Thành Trung, Kiên Ứng and HuyR.

Second performance round
Episode 5 - First round (August 3rd, 2024)
Performance order	Alliance [English translation]	Type of performance	Performance song [English translation] (Composers)	Performing members		Performance score	
1	Kame	Performance	"Giàu sang" [Rich] (Rhymastic, Kay Trần)	Phan Đinh Tùng		1380	
1	Kame	Performance	"Giàu sang" [Rich] (Rhymastic, Kay Trần)	Nguyễn Trần Duy Nhất		1380	
1	Kame	Performance	"Giàu sang" [Rich] (Rhymastic, Kay Trần)	Tăng Phúc		1380	
1	Kame	Performance	"Giàu sang" [Rich] (Rhymastic, Kay Trần)	Liên Bỉnh Phát		1380	
1	Kame	Performance	"Giàu sang" [Rich] (Rhymastic, Kay Trần)	(S)TRONG Trọng Hiếu		1380	
1	Kame	Performance	"Giàu sang" [Rich] (Rhymastic, Kay Trần)	Kay Trần		1380	
2	Phát tài [Get rich]	Vocal	"Dẫu có lỗi lầm" [Despite mistakes] (Hồ Hoài Anh, Binz, Bùi Công Nam)	Bằng Kiều		1790	
2	Phát tài [Get rich]	Vocal	"Dẫu có lỗi lầm" [Despite mistakes] (Hồ Hoài Anh, Binz, Bùi Công Nam)	Thanh Duy		1790	
2	Phát tài [Get rich]	Vocal	"Dẫu có lỗi lầm" [Despite mistakes] (Hồ Hoài Anh, Binz, Bùi Công Nam)	Binz		1790	
2	Phát tài [Get rich]	Vocal	"Dẫu có lỗi lầm" [Despite mistakes] (Hồ Hoài Anh, Binz, Bùi Công Nam)	Thiên Minh		1790	
2	Phát tài [Get rich]	Vocal	"Dẫu có lỗi lầm" [Despite mistakes] (Hồ Hoài Anh, Binz, Bùi Công Nam)	Bùi Công Nam		1790	
2	Phát tài [Get rich]	Vocal	"Dẫu có lỗi lầm" [Despite mistakes] (Hồ Hoài Anh, Binz, Bùi Công Nam)	Duy Khánh		1790	
3	Cửu Long [Nine dragons]	Performance	"Tình yêu ngủ quên" [Overslept love] (Hoàng Tôn, Jun Phạm, HuyR)	Trương Thế Vinh		1480	
3	Cửu Long [Nine dragons]	Performance	"Tình yêu ngủ quên" [Overslept love] (Hoàng Tôn, Jun Phạm, HuyR)	Hà Lê		1480	
3	Cửu Long [Nine dragons]	Performance	"Tình yêu ngủ quên" [Overslept love] (Hoàng Tôn, Jun Phạm, HuyR)	Jun Phạm		1480	
3	Cửu Long [Nine dragons]	Performance	"Tình yêu ngủ quên" [Overslept love] (Hoàng Tôn, Jun Phạm, HuyR)	BB Trần		1480	
3	Cửu Long [Nine dragons]	Performance	"Tình yêu ngủ quên" [Overslept love] (Hoàng Tôn, Jun Phạm, HuyR)	Kiên Ứng		1480	
3	Cửu Long [Nine dragons]	Performance	"Tình yêu ngủ quên" [Overslept love] (Hoàng Tôn, Jun Phạm, HuyR)	HuyR		1480	
4	Tinh tú [Constellations]	Performance	"Chợt nghe bước em về" [Suddenly heard that you're coming back](Quốc Vượng, Rhymastic)	Tự Long		2150	
4	Tinh tú [Constellations]	Performance	"Chợt nghe bước em về" [Suddenly heard that you're coming back](Quốc Vượng, Rhymastic)	Đinh Tiến Đạt		2150	
4	Tinh tú [Constellations]	Performance	"Chợt nghe bước em về" [Suddenly heard that you're coming back](Quốc Vượng, Rhymastic)	Quốc Thiên		2150	
4	Tinh tú [Constellations]	Performance	"Chợt nghe bước em về" [Suddenly heard that you're coming back](Quốc Vượng, Rhymastic)	Cường Seven		2150	
4	Tinh tú [Constellations]	Performance	"Chợt nghe bước em về" [Suddenly heard that you're coming back](Quốc Vượng, Rhymastic)	Rhymastic		2150	
4	Tinh tú [Constellations]	Performance	"Chợt nghe bước em về" [Suddenly heard that you're coming back](Quốc Vượng, Rhymastic)	SOOBIN		2150	
Episode 6 - Second round (August 10th, 2024)
Performance order	Alliance	Type of performance	Performance song [English translation] (Composers)	Performing members		Performance score	
1	Tinh tú [Constellations]	Vocal	"Những kẻ mộng mơ" [The dreamers] (Nguyễn Bảo Trọng, Rhymastic)	Tự Long		2470	
1	Tinh tú [Constellations]	Vocal	"Những kẻ mộng mơ" [The dreamers] (Nguyễn Bảo Trọng, Rhymastic)	Tuấn Hưng		2470	
1	Tinh tú [Constellations]	Vocal	"Những kẻ mộng mơ" [The dreamers] (Nguyễn Bảo Trọng, Rhymastic)	Tiến Luật		2470	
1	Tinh tú [Constellations]	Vocal	"Những kẻ mộng mơ" [The dreamers] (Nguyễn Bảo Trọng, Rhymastic)	Quốc Thiên		2470	
1	Tinh tú [Constellations]	Vocal	"Những kẻ mộng mơ" [The dreamers] (Nguyễn Bảo Trọng, Rhymastic)	Rhymastic		2470	
1	Tinh tú [Constellations]	Vocal	"Những kẻ mộng mơ" [The dreamers] (Nguyễn Bảo Trọng, Rhymastic)	SOOBIN		2470	
2	Kame	Vocal	"bao tiền một mớ bình yên?" [How much money for a heap of peace?] (14 Casper, Neko Lê)	Phan Đinh Tùng		1970	
2	Kame	Vocal	"bao tiền một mớ bình yên?" [How much money for a heap of peace?] (14 Casper, Neko Lê)	Đăng Khôi		1970	
2	Kame	Vocal	"bao tiền một mớ bình yên?" [How much money for a heap of peace?] (14 Casper, Neko Lê)	Neko Lê		1970	
2	Kame	Vocal	"bao tiền một mớ bình yên?" [How much money for a heap of peace?] (14 Casper, Neko Lê)	Tăng Phúc		1970	
2	Kame	Vocal	"bao tiền một mớ bình yên?" [How much money for a heap of peace?] (14 Casper, Neko Lê)	Kay Trần		1970	
3	Phát tài [Get rich]	Performance	"Gót hồng" & "Cao gót" [Pink heel & High heel] (Bảo Phúc, SOOBIN, It's CHARLES., Touliver, SlimV, Binz)	Hồng Sơn		1130	
3	Phát tài [Get rich]	Performance	"Gót hồng" & "Cao gót" [Pink heel & High heel] (Bảo Phúc, SOOBIN, It's CHARLES., Touliver, SlimV, Binz)	Thanh Duy		1130	
3	Phát tài [Get rich]	Performance	"Gót hồng" & "Cao gót" [Pink heel & High heel] (Bảo Phúc, SOOBIN, It's CHARLES., Touliver, SlimV, Binz)	Thiên Minh		1130	
3	Phát tài [Get rich]	Performance	"Gót hồng" & "Cao gót" [Pink heel & High heel] (Bảo Phúc, SOOBIN, It's CHARLES., Touliver, SlimV, Binz)	S.T Sơn Thạch		1130	
3	Phát tài [Get rich]	Performance	"Gót hồng" & "Cao gót" [Pink heel & High heel] (Bảo Phúc, SOOBIN, It's CHARLES., Touliver, SlimV, Binz)	Bùi Công Nam		1130	
3	Phát tài [Get rich]	Performance	"Gót hồng" & "Cao gót" [Pink heel & High heel] (Bảo Phúc, SOOBIN, It's CHARLES., Touliver, SlimV, Binz)	Duy Khánh		1130	
4	Cửu Long [Nine dragons]	Vocal	"nếu một mai tôi bay lên trời" [If a day I fly into the sky] (Hứa Kim Tuyền, Jun Phạm)	Phạm Khánh Hưng		1230	
4	Cửu Long [Nine dragons]	Vocal	"nếu một mai tôi bay lên trời" [If a day I fly into the sky] (Hứa Kim Tuyền, Jun Phạm)	Thành Trung		1230	
4	Cửu Long [Nine dragons]	Vocal	"nếu một mai tôi bay lên trời" [If a day I fly into the sky] (Hứa Kim Tuyền, Jun Phạm)	Đỗ Hoàng Hiệp		1230	
4	Cửu Long [Nine dragons]	Vocal	"nếu một mai tôi bay lên trời" [If a day I fly into the sky] (Hứa Kim Tuyền, Jun Phạm)	Jun Phạm		1230	
Final result of the second performance round
Alliance	Members		First round score	Second round score	Total score	Individual firepower points	Individual result
Kame	Phan Đinh Tùng		1380	1970	3350	350	Advanced
Kame	Đăng Khôi		1380	1970	3350	140	Advanced
Kame	Nguyễn Trần Duy Nhất		1380	1970	3350	200	Advanced
Kame	Neko Lê		1380	1970	3350	460	Advanced
Kame	Tăng Phúc		1380	1970	3350	170	Advanced
Kame	Liên Bỉnh Phát		1380	1970	3350	40	Advanced
Kame	(S)TRONG Trọng Hiếu		1380	1970	3350	220	Advanced
Kame	Kay Trần		1380	1970	3350	750	Advanced
Phát tài [Get rich]	Hồng Sơn		1790	1130	2920	90	Advanced
Phát tài [Get rich]	Bằng Kiều		1790	1130	2920	130	Advanced
Phát tài [Get rich]	Thanh Duy		1790	1130	2920	420	Advanced
Phát tài [Get rich]	Binz		1790	1130	2920	290	Advanced
Phát tài [Get rich]	Thiên Minh		1790	1130	2920	100	Advanced
Phát tài [Get rich]	S.T Sơn Thạch		1790	1130	2920	930	Advanced
Phát tài [Get rich]	Bùi Công Nam		1790	1130	2920	430	Advanced
Phát tài [Get rich]	Duy Khánh		1790	1130	2920	450	Advanced
Tinh tú [Constellations]	Tự Long		2150	2470	4620	280	Advanced
Tinh tú [Constellations]	Tuấn Hưng		2150	2470	4620	80	Advanced
Tinh tú [Constellations]	Đinh Tiến Đạt		2150	2470	4620	150	Advanced
Tinh tú [Constellations]	Tiến Luật		2150	2470	4620	340	Advanced
Tinh tú [Constellations]	Quốc Thiên		2150	2470	4620	210	Advanced
Tinh tú [Constellations]	Cường Seven		2150	2470	4620	170	Advanced
Tinh tú [Constellations]	Rhymastic		2150	2470	4620	150	Advanced
Tinh tú [Constellations]	SOOBIN		2150	2470	4620	790	Advanced
Cửu Long [Nine dragons]	Phạm Khánh Hưng		1480	1230	2710	80	Advanced
Cửu Long [Nine dragons]	Thành Trung		1480	1230	2710	40	Eliminated
Cửu Long [Nine dragons]	Trương Thế Vinh		1480	1230	2710	370	Advanced
Cửu Long [Nine dragons]	Hà Lê		1480	1230	2710	180	Advanced
Cửu Long [Nine dragons]	Đỗ Hoàng Hiệp		1480	1230	2710	170	Advanced
Cửu Long [Nine dragons]	Jun Phạm		1480	1230	2710	1210	Advanced
Cửu Long [Nine dragons]	BB Trần		1480	1230	2710	680	Advanced
Cửu Long [Nine dragons]	Kiên Ứng		1480	1230	2710	90	Eliminated
Cửu Long [Nine dragons]	HuyR		1480	1230	2710	40	Eliminated

- The talented brother is the team captain
- Safe team's score

=== Third performance round: The shield ===
For the third performances, the brothers formed big houses from the smaller houses. Because the Tinh tú alliance placed first for the last performance round, the two houses that composed the alliance (Sao sáng house and Tái sinh house) retained their original lineup and team captain. They would then go to the ceremony room to recruit additional members. The rest of the remaining cast had their houses disbanded and proceed to anonymously vote for two new house captains. In the end, four new houses are being made, with two seven-members houses (Mứt gừng (Ginger jam) house and Trẻ (Nursery) house) and two eight-members houses(Cá lớn (Big fish) house and Chín muồi (Ripening) house). Bằng Kiều and S.T Sơn Thạch was voted to be the two additional team captains, joining the captains lineup of this round with Đinh Tiến Đạt and Cường Seven.

The procedure of choosing songs is similar to the second performance round. Each house would - similar to the second performance round - perform two songs, with one vocal-focused song and one performance-focused song. The process of distributing the members to perform in what song(s) are also similar to the last performance round, except that there could be a maximum of five members performing in a song.

The rules for the third performance round are as follow: Unlike the last round, each house may not choose which song to perform in what round, as every house would perform the vocal-focused song first and the performance-focused song later. Additionally, for each round, two houses would pair up to battle each other. After each battling pair, the 350 in-studio audiences would vote for their favorite performance. In the end of the performance round, the in-studio audience would vote for their three favorite brothers to make up their individual firepower points.

After receiving the results, the two houses with a bigger total score of the two performances would be the winning houses, meaning all of its members would automatically advance to the next round. In the scenario that a house had win both of their performances, they would have an additional 100 points being added to the total score. For the other two non-safe houses, each house would have to discuss with each other and vote for two of the three brothers that have the least amount of individual firepower points to stay in the competition. The brother with the least vote in each house would be eliminated.

Concluding the third performance round, Cá lớn house and Chín muồi house are the winning houses, meaning Trẻ house and Mứt gừng house are the danger houses. The two brothers received the least votes to stay in the competition, hence being eliminated from the competition, are Hồng Sơn (Mứt gừng house) and Hà Lê (Trẻ house).

Episode 8 - Third performance round (August 24th, 2024)
Vocal round
Performance order	House [English translation]	Performance song [English translation] (Composers)	Performing members		Performance score	
First battling pair
1	Trẻ [Nursery]	"Thu hoài" [Forever autumn] (Hoài Thanh, 14 Casper, Rhymastic)	Đinh Tiến Đạt		1830	
1	Trẻ [Nursery]	"Thu hoài" [Forever autumn] (Hoài Thanh, 14 Casper, Rhymastic)	Tiến Luật		1830	
1	Trẻ [Nursery]	"Thu hoài" [Forever autumn] (Hoài Thanh, 14 Casper, Rhymastic)	Hà Lê		1830	
1	Trẻ [Nursery]	"Thu hoài" [Forever autumn] (Hoài Thanh, 14 Casper, Rhymastic)	Quốc Thiên		1830	
1	Trẻ [Nursery]	"Thu hoài" [Forever autumn] (Hoài Thanh, 14 Casper, Rhymastic)	Rhymastic		1830	
1	Trẻ [Nursery]	"Thu hoài" [Forever autumn] (Hoài Thanh, 14 Casper, Rhymastic)	Tuấn Hưng		1830	
2	Cá lớn [Big fish]	"Là anh đó" [It's me] (Andiez, SOOBIN)	Tuấn Hưng		1650	
2	Cá lớn [Big fish]	"Là anh đó" [It's me] (Andiez, SOOBIN)	Đăng Khôi		1650	
2	Cá lớn [Big fish]	"Là anh đó" [It's me] (Andiez, SOOBIN)	Thanh Duy		1650	
2	Cá lớn [Big fish]	"Là anh đó" [It's me] (Andiez, SOOBIN)	(S)TRONG Trọng Hiếu		1650	
2	Cá lớn [Big fish]	"Là anh đó" [It's me] (Andiez, SOOBIN)	SOOBIN		1650	
Second battling pair
3	Chín muồi [Ripening]	"Anh sẽ nhớ mãi" [I will forever remember] (Bằng Kiều, Đức Trí, Neko Lê, Bùi Công Nam)	Neko Lê		1610	
3	Chín muồi [Ripening]	"Anh sẽ nhớ mãi" [I will forever remember] (Bằng Kiều, Đức Trí, Neko Lê, Bùi Công Nam)	Tăng Phúc		1610	
3	Chín muồi [Ripening]	"Anh sẽ nhớ mãi" [I will forever remember] (Bằng Kiều, Đức Trí, Neko Lê, Bùi Công Nam)	Thiên Minh		1610	
3	Chín muồi [Ripening]	"Anh sẽ nhớ mãi" [I will forever remember] (Bằng Kiều, Đức Trí, Neko Lê, Bùi Công Nam)	BB Trần		1610	
3	Chín muồi [Ripening]	"Anh sẽ nhớ mãi" [I will forever remember] (Bằng Kiều, Đức Trí, Neko Lê, Bùi Công Nam)	Bùi Công Nam		1610	
4	Mứt gừng [Ginger jam]	"Buông" [Release] (Nguyễn Duy Anh)	Bằng Kiều		1870	
4	Mứt gừng [Ginger jam]	"Buông" [Release] (Nguyễn Duy Anh)	Phan Đinh Tùng		1870	
4	Mứt gừng [Ginger jam]	"Buông" [Release] (Nguyễn Duy Anh)	Phạm Khánh Hưng		1870	
4	Mứt gừng [Ginger jam]	"Buông" [Release] (Nguyễn Duy Anh)	Trương Thế Vinh		1870	
4	Mứt gừng [Ginger jam]	"Buông" [Release] (Nguyễn Duy Anh)	Đỗ Hoàng Hiệp		1870	
Performance round
Performance order	House [English translation]	Performance song [English translation] (Composers)	Performing members		Performance score	
First battling pair
1	Mứt gừng [Ginger jam]	"Triệu lý do" [A million reasons] (Thiều Bảo Trâm, Nguyễn Bảo Trọng, Gonzo)	Hồng Sơn		1600	
1	Mứt gừng [Ginger jam]	"Triệu lý do" [A million reasons] (Thiều Bảo Trâm, Nguyễn Bảo Trọng, Gonzo)	Phạm Khánh Hưng		1600	
1	Mứt gừng [Ginger jam]	"Triệu lý do" [A million reasons] (Thiều Bảo Trâm, Nguyễn Bảo Trọng, Gonzo)	Trương Thế Vinh		1600	
1	Mứt gừng [Ginger jam]	"Triệu lý do" [A million reasons] (Thiều Bảo Trâm, Nguyễn Bảo Trọng, Gonzo)	Đỗ Hoàng Hiệp		1600	
1	Mứt gừng [Ginger jam]	"Triệu lý do" [A million reasons] (Thiều Bảo Trâm, Nguyễn Bảo Trọng, Gonzo)	Nguyễn Trần Duy Nhất		1600	
1	Mứt gừng [Ginger jam]	"Triệu lý do" [A million reasons] (Thiều Bảo Trâm, Nguyễn Bảo Trọng, Gonzo)	Tự Long		1600	
2	Cá lớn [Big fish]	"Đường xa ướt mưa" & "Đừng qua lối đó" [Long road was rain wetted & Don't go that way] (Đức Huy, Võ Thiện Thanh, SOOBIN)	Tự Long		1880	
2	Cá lớn [Big fish]	"Đường xa ướt mưa" & "Đừng qua lối đó" [Long road was rain wetted & Don't go that way] (Đức Huy, Võ Thiện Thanh, SOOBIN)	Thanh Duy		1880	
2	Cá lớn [Big fish]	"Đường xa ướt mưa" & "Đừng qua lối đó" [Long road was rain wetted & Don't go that way] (Đức Huy, Võ Thiện Thanh, SOOBIN)	Cường Seven		1880	
2	Cá lớn [Big fish]	"Đường xa ướt mưa" & "Đừng qua lối đó" [Long road was rain wetted & Don't go that way] (Đức Huy, Võ Thiện Thanh, SOOBIN)	Jun Phạm		1880	
2	Cá lớn [Big fish]	"Đường xa ướt mưa" & "Đừng qua lối đó" [Long road was rain wetted & Don't go that way] (Đức Huy, Võ Thiện Thanh, SOOBIN)	SOOBIN		1880	
Second battling pair
3	Trẻ [Nursery]	"Trái Đất ôm Mặt Trời" [The Earth hugs the Sun] (Kai Đinh, Grey D, TDK, NewL, Hà Lê, Binz)	Đinh Tiến Đạt		1580	
3	Trẻ [Nursery]	"Trái Đất ôm Mặt Trời" [The Earth hugs the Sun] (Kai Đinh, Grey D, TDK, NewL, Hà Lê, Binz)	Hà Lê		1580	
3	Trẻ [Nursery]	"Trái Đất ôm Mặt Trời" [The Earth hugs the Sun] (Kai Đinh, Grey D, TDK, NewL, Hà Lê, Binz)	Quốc Thiên		1580	
3	Trẻ [Nursery]	"Trái Đất ôm Mặt Trời" [The Earth hugs the Sun] (Kai Đinh, Grey D, TDK, NewL, Hà Lê, Binz)	Binz		1580	
3	Trẻ [Nursery]	"Trái Đất ôm Mặt Trời" [The Earth hugs the Sun] (Kai Đinh, Grey D, TDK, NewL, Hà Lê, Binz)	Duy Khánh		1580	
4	Chín muồi [Ripening]	"Let me feel your love tonight" (Rhymastic, Touliver, Kay Trần)	Thiên Minh		1900	
4	Chín muồi [Ripening]	"Let me feel your love tonight" (Rhymastic, Touliver, Kay Trần)	BB Trần		1900	
4	Chín muồi [Ripening]	"Let me feel your love tonight" (Rhymastic, Touliver, Kay Trần)	Liên Bỉnh Phát		1900	
4	Chín muồi [Ripening]	"Let me feel your love tonight" (Rhymastic, Touliver, Kay Trần)	S.T Sơn Thạch		1900	
4	Chín muồi [Ripening]	"Let me feel your love tonight" (Rhymastic, Touliver, Kay Trần)	Kay Trần		1900	
Final result of the third performance round
House [English translation]	Members	Vocal round score	Performance round score	Total score	Individual firepower points	Individual result
Cá lớn [Big fish]	Tự Long	1650	1880	3530		Advanced
Cá lớn [Big fish]	Tuấn Hưng	1650	1880	3530		Advanced
Cá lớn [Big fish]	Đăng Khôi	1650	1880	3530		Advanced
Cá lớn [Big fish]	Thanh Duy	1650	1880	3530		Advanced
Cá lớn [Big fish]	Cường Seven	1650	1880	3530		Advanced
Cá lớn [Big fish]	(S)TRONG Trọng Hiếu	1650	1880	3530		Advanced
Cá lớn [Big fish]	SOOBIN	1650	1880	3530		Advanced
Chín muồi [Ripening]	Jun Phạm	1610	1900	3510		Advanced
Chín muồi [Ripening]	Neko Lê	1610	1900	3510		Advanced
Chín muồi [Ripening]	Tăng Phúc	1610	1900	3510		Advanced
Chín muồi [Ripening]	Thiên Minh	1610	1900	3510		Advanced
Chín muồi [Ripening]	BB Trần	1610	1900	3510		Advanced
Chín muồi [Ripening]	Liên Bỉnh Phát	1610	1900	3510		Advanced
Chín muồi [Ripening]	S.T Sơn Thạch	1610	1900	3510		Advanced
Chín muồi [Ripening]	Kay Trần	1610	1900	3510		Advanced
Mứt gừng [Ginger jam]	Hồng Sơn	1870	1600	3470	110	Eliminated
Mứt gừng [Ginger jam]	Bằng Kiều	1870	1600	3470	300	Advanced
Mứt gừng [Ginger jam]	Phan Đinh Tùng	1870	1600	3470	310	Advanced
Mứt gừng [Ginger jam]	Phạm Khánh Hưng	1870	1600	3470	50	Advanced
Mứt gừng [Ginger jam]	Trương Thế Vinh	1870	1600	3470	230	Advanced
Mứt gừng [Ginger jam]	Đỗ Hoàng Hiệp	1870	1600	3470	520	Advanced
Mứt gừng [Ginger jam]	Nguyễn Trần Duy Nhất	1870	1600	3470	220	Advanced
Trẻ [Nursery]	Đinh Tiến Đạt	1830	1580	3410	210	Advanced
Trẻ [Nursery]	Tiến Luật	1830	1580	3410	780	Advanced
Trẻ [Nursery]	Hà Lê	1830	1580	3410	150	Eliminated
Trẻ [Nursery]	Quốc Thiên	1830	1580	3410	290	Advanced
Trẻ [Nursery]	Binz	1830	1580	3410	610	Advanced
Trẻ [Nursery]	Rhymastic	1830	1580	3410	260	Advanced
Trẻ [Nursery]	Duy Khánh	1830	1580	3410	230	Advanced

- The talented brother is the team captain
- Safe team's score
- Winning performance's score
- The score is not public

=== Fourth performance round: Supporting point ===
For the fourth performance, the brothers could either continue to create big houses from smaller houses like the previous performance round or retain the last round's lineup. They decided on the latter, with the only change being Trương Thế Vinh are now the captain of the Mứt gừng house. They then proceed to select songs for the performance round similar to all of the previous performance rounds, however with a reject twist in this round. Specifically, if there are houses that choose the same song, a house could request a reject, resulting in the process of bidding for the song being cancelled and all of the houses would have to restart the process. All of the houses could reject multiple times, however for each rejection, they would lose 50 firepower points from their fund. There are three possible outcomes for bidding a song:

- If there are many houses that chose the same song and no one reject the bidding, the house that put out the highest price would get the song.
- If there are many houses that chose the same song and had the same bidding price, they would have to publicly bid and raise the price to have the song.
- When no more houses that decided to reject the bidding request and two houses already had their songs, the two remaining house - if they chose the same song - continue to publicly bid and raise the price to have the song.

Unlike all of the previous performance rounds, the fourth performance round was divided into three battling rounds, being a solo round, a duet round and a whole house round. For the solo round, each house would have a brother to perform a performance all by themself. The same goes to the duet round, except that they would nominate two members to perform a duet. In the end, all of the house's members would have to perform in the whole house round.

For the first two rounds (solo and duet), after the end of each round, each in-studio audience may vote for their one favorite performance. For the last round (whole house round), after each performance, they could either vote or not vote for that specific performance (meaning they could either vote for some, all or none of the performances). The house with the highest total score from all of their performance is the singular safe house and all of its members automatically move on to the next round. Four brothers with the lowest firepower points from all of the three remaining houses would be eliminated.

Concluding the fourth performance round, Trẻ house (with 6060 points) had the highest total score and therefore, being the safe house of this round. The four brothers that were eliminated are: Phạm Khánh Hưng, Nguyễn Trần Duy Nhất (Mứt gừng house), Đăng Khôi (Cá lớn house) and Neko Lê (Chín muồi house).

Fourth performance round
Episode 9 (August 31st, 2024)
Solo round
Performance order	House [English translation]		Performance song [English translation] (Composers)		Performing member		Performance score
1	Trẻ [Nursery]		"Sao cũng được" [Whatever is fine] (Binz)		Tiến Luật		1700
2	Mứt gừng [Ginger jam]		"Một vòng Việt Nam" [Around Vietnam] (Đông Thiên Đức)		Phan Đinh Tùng		470
3	Chín muồi [Ripening]		"Thuận nước đẩy thuyền" [Going with the flow] (S.T Sơn Thạch, Thanh Hưng, Andiez, Kriss Ngô)		S.T Sơn Thạch		970
4	Cá lớn [Big fish]		"Vượt lên mọi thử thách" [Overcome all of the challenges] (Phúc Bồ, Rick, MastaL, SlimV)		Tuấn Hưng		360
Episode 10 (September 7th, 2024)
Duet round
Performance order	House [English translation]		Performance song [English translation] (Composers)		Performing members		Performance score
1	Trẻ [Nursery]		"Đêm cô đơn" [Lonely night] (Trung Kiên, Rhymastic)		Quốc Thiên		1340
1	Trẻ [Nursery]		"Đêm cô đơn" [Lonely night] (Trung Kiên, Rhymastic)		Rhymastic		1340
2	Mứt gừng [Ginger jam]		"Gọi anh" [Call me] (Dương Thụ)		Phạm Khánh Hưng		300
2	Mứt gừng [Ginger jam]		"Gọi anh" [Call me] (Dương Thụ)		Đỗ Hoàng Hiệp		300
3	Chín muồi [Ripening]		"Chuyện nhà bé thôi, con đừng về" [It's just a minor family matter, you don't need to come back] (Kai Đinh, Kay Trần, Bùi Công Nam)		Kay Trần		1440
3	Chín muồi [Ripening]		"Chuyện nhà bé thôi, con đừng về" [It's just a minor family matter, you don't need to come back] (Kai Đinh, Kay Trần, Bùi Công Nam)		Bùi Công Nam		1440
4	Cá lớn [Big fish]		"12h03" (APJ, Tinle)		Cường Seven		420
4	Cá lớn [Big fish]		"12h03" (APJ, Tinle)		(S)TRONG Trọng Hiếu		420
Whole house round
Performance order	House [English translation]	Performance song [English translation] (Composers)	Members	Performance score	Total score	Individual firepower points	Individual result
1	Chín muồi	"Mưa trên phố Huế" [Rain on the Huế's street] (Minh Kỳ, Tôn Nữ Thụy Khương, Neko Lê)	Neko Lê	3210	5620		Eliminated
1	Chín muồi	"Mưa trên phố Huế" [Rain on the Huế's street] (Minh Kỳ, Tôn Nữ Thụy Khương, Neko Lê)	Tăng Phúc	3210	5620	150	Advanced
1	Chín muồi	"Mưa trên phố Huế" [Rain on the Huế's street] (Minh Kỳ, Tôn Nữ Thụy Khương, Neko Lê)	Thiên Minh	3210	5620	350	Advanced
1	Chín muồi	"Mưa trên phố Huế" [Rain on the Huế's street] (Minh Kỳ, Tôn Nữ Thụy Khương, Neko Lê)	BB Trần	3210	5620	370	Advanced
1	Chín muồi	"Mưa trên phố Huế" [Rain on the Huế's street] (Minh Kỳ, Tôn Nữ Thụy Khương, Neko Lê)	Liên Bỉnh Phát	3210	5620	130	Advanced
1	Chín muồi	"Mưa trên phố Huế" [Rain on the Huế's street] (Minh Kỳ, Tôn Nữ Thụy Khương, Neko Lê)	S.T Sơn Thạch	3210	5620	270	Advanced
1	Chín muồi	"Mưa trên phố Huế" [Rain on the Huế's street] (Minh Kỳ, Tôn Nữ Thụy Khương, Neko Lê)	Kay Trần	3210	5620	860	Advanced
1	Chín muồi	"Mưa trên phố Huế" [Rain on the Huế's street] (Minh Kỳ, Tôn Nữ Thụy Khương, Neko Lê)	Bùi Công Nam	3210	5620	340	Advanced
2	Trẻ	"Đào liễu" [Peach and willow] (Ancient Chèo, Binz)	Đinh Tiến Đạt	3020	6060	320	Advanced
2	Trẻ	"Đào liễu" [Peach and willow] (Ancient Chèo, Binz)	Tiến Luật	3020	6060	650	Advanced
2	Trẻ	"Đào liễu" [Peach and willow] (Ancient Chèo, Binz)	Quốc Thiên	3020	6060	560	Advanced
2	Trẻ	"Đào liễu" [Peach and willow] (Ancient Chèo, Binz)	Binz	3020	6060	540	Advanced
2	Trẻ	"Đào liễu" [Peach and willow] (Ancient Chèo, Binz)	Rhymastic	3020	6060	400	Advanced
2	Trẻ	"Đào liễu" [Peach and willow] (Ancient Chèo, Binz)	Duy Khánh	3020	6060	180	Advanced
3	Mứt gừng	"Dạ cổ hoài lang" [Night drum beats cause longing for absent husband] (Cao Văn Lầu, Hữu Quốc)	Bằng Kiều	2910	3680	190	Advanced
3	Mứt gừng	"Dạ cổ hoài lang" [Night drum beats cause longing for absent husband] (Cao Văn Lầu, Hữu Quốc)	Phan Đinh Tùng	2910	3680	160	Advanced
3	Mứt gừng	"Dạ cổ hoài lang" [Night drum beats cause longing for absent husband] (Cao Văn Lầu, Hữu Quốc)	Phạm Khánh Hưng	2910	3680		Eliminated
3	Mứt gừng	"Dạ cổ hoài lang" [Night drum beats cause longing for absent husband] (Cao Văn Lầu, Hữu Quốc)	Trương Thế Vinh	2910	3680	230	Advanced
3	Mứt gừng	"Dạ cổ hoài lang" [Night drum beats cause longing for absent husband] (Cao Văn Lầu, Hữu Quốc)	Đỗ Hoàng Hiệp	2910	3680	330	Advanced
3	Mứt gừng	"Dạ cổ hoài lang" [Night drum beats cause longing for absent husband] (Cao Văn Lầu, Hữu Quốc)	Nguyễn Trần Duy Nhất	2910	3680		Eliminated
4	Cá lớn	"Chiếc khăn piêu" [The piêu scarf] (Doãn Nho, SOOBIN)	Tự Long	3010	3790	630	Advanced
4	Cá lớn	"Chiếc khăn piêu" [The piêu scarf] (Doãn Nho, SOOBIN)	Tuấn Hưng	3010	3790	210	Advanced
4	Cá lớn	"Chiếc khăn piêu" [The piêu scarf] (Doãn Nho, SOOBIN)	Đăng Khôi	3010	3790		Eliminated
4	Cá lớn	"Chiếc khăn piêu" [The piêu scarf] (Doãn Nho, SOOBIN)	Thanh Duy	3010	3790	290	Advanced
4	Cá lớn	"Chiếc khăn piêu" [The piêu scarf] (Doãn Nho, SOOBIN)	Cường Seven	3010	3790	680	Advanced
4	Cá lớn	"Chiếc khăn piêu" [The piêu scarf] (Doãn Nho, SOOBIN)	Jun Phạm	3010	3790	690	Advanced
4	Cá lớn	"Chiếc khăn piêu" [The piêu scarf] (Doãn Nho, SOOBIN)	(S)TRONG Trọng Hiếu	3010	3790	360	Advanced
4	Cá lớn	"Chiếc khăn piêu" [The piêu scarf] (Doãn Nho, SOOBIN)	SOOBIN	3010	3790	1130	Advanced

- The talented brother is the team captain
- Safe team's score
- The score is not public

=== Fifth performance round: Parallel worlds ===
Fifth performance round
Episode 12 (September 28th, 2024)
Vocal round
Performance order	House [English translation]	Performance song [English translation] (Composers)	Performing members			Performance score		Number of elimination slot received
1	Tinh hoa (Quintessence)	"Phai" [Faded] (Microwave, It's CHARLES., SOOBIN)	Bằng Kiều			1720		1
1	Tinh hoa (Quintessence)	"Phai" [Faded] (Microwave, It's CHARLES., SOOBIN)	Tự Long			1720		1
1	Tinh hoa (Quintessence)	"Phai" [Faded] (Microwave, It's CHARLES., SOOBIN)	Phan Đinh Tùng			1720		1
1	Tinh hoa (Quintessence)	"Phai" [Faded] (Microwave, It's CHARLES., SOOBIN)	Tuấn Hưng			1720		1
1	Tinh hoa (Quintessence)	"Phai" [Faded] (Microwave, It's CHARLES., SOOBIN)	Trương Thế Vinh			1720		1
1	Tinh hoa (Quintessence)	"Phai" [Faded] (Microwave, It's CHARLES., SOOBIN)	Jun Phạm			1720		1
1	Tinh hoa (Quintessence)	"Phai" [Faded] (Microwave, It's CHARLES., SOOBIN)	BB Trần			1720		1
1	Tinh hoa (Quintessence)	"Phai" [Faded] (Microwave, It's CHARLES., SOOBIN)	S.T Sơn Thạch			1720		1
1	Tinh hoa (Quintessence)	"Phai" [Faded] (Microwave, It's CHARLES., SOOBIN)	SOOBIN			1720		1
1	Tinh hoa (Quintessence)	"Phai" [Faded] (Microwave, It's CHARLES., SOOBIN)	Kay Trần			1720		1
2	Thiếu nhi (Children)	"If" (Vũ Cát Tường, Bùi Công Nam)	Đinh Tiến Đạt			1780		0
2	Thiếu nhi (Children)	"If" (Vũ Cát Tường, Bùi Công Nam)	Tiến Luật			1780		0
2	Thiếu nhi (Children)	"If" (Vũ Cát Tường, Bùi Công Nam)	Đỗ Hoàng Hiệp			1780		0
2	Thiếu nhi (Children)	"If" (Vũ Cát Tường, Bùi Công Nam)	Thanh Duy			1780		0
2	Thiếu nhi (Children)	"If" (Vũ Cát Tường, Bùi Công Nam)	Quốc Thiên			1780		0
2	Thiếu nhi (Children)	"If" (Vũ Cát Tường, Bùi Công Nam)	Binz			1780		0
2	Thiếu nhi (Children)	"If" (Vũ Cát Tường, Bùi Công Nam)	Tăng Phúc			1780		0
2	Thiếu nhi (Children)	"If" (Vũ Cát Tường, Bùi Công Nam)	Thiên Minh			1780		0
2	Thiếu nhi (Children)	"If" (Vũ Cát Tường, Bùi Công Nam)	Liên Bỉnh Phát			1780		0
2	Thiếu nhi (Children)	"If" (Vũ Cát Tường, Bùi Công Nam)	Rhymastic			1780		0
2	Thiếu nhi (Children)	"If" (Vũ Cát Tường, Bùi Công Nam)	Bùi Công Nam			1780		0
2	Thiếu nhi (Children)	"If" (Vũ Cát Tường, Bùi Công Nam)	Duy Khánh			1780		0
Performance round
Performance order	House [English translation]	Performance song [English translation] (Composers)	Performing members			Performance score		Number of elimination slot received
1	Tinh hoa (Quintessence)	"Rơi" [Fall] (Hồ Hoài Anh, Kay Trần)	Trương Thế Vinh			1850		1
1	Tinh hoa (Quintessence)	"Rơi" [Fall] (Hồ Hoài Anh, Kay Trần)	Jun Phạm			1850		1
1	Tinh hoa (Quintessence)	"Rơi" [Fall] (Hồ Hoài Anh, Kay Trần)	BB Trần			1850		1
1	Tinh hoa (Quintessence)	"Rơi" [Fall] (Hồ Hoài Anh, Kay Trần)	S.T Sơn Thạch			1850		1
1	Tinh hoa (Quintessence)	"Rơi" [Fall] (Hồ Hoài Anh, Kay Trần)	(S)TRONG Trọng Hiếu			1850		1
1	Tinh hoa (Quintessence)	"Rơi" [Fall] (Hồ Hoài Anh, Kay Trần)	Kay Trần			1850		1
2	Thiếu nhi (Children)	"Bay" [Fly] (Nguyễn Hải Phong, It's CHARLES., Binz, Rhymastic)	Đinh Tiến Đạt			1650		0
2	Thiếu nhi (Children)	"Bay" [Fly] (Nguyễn Hải Phong, It's CHARLES., Binz, Rhymastic)	Tiến Luật			1650		0
2	Thiếu nhi (Children)	"Bay" [Fly] (Nguyễn Hải Phong, It's CHARLES., Binz, Rhymastic)	Đỗ Hoàng Hiệp			1650		0
2	Thiếu nhi (Children)	"Bay" [Fly] (Nguyễn Hải Phong, It's CHARLES., Binz, Rhymastic)	Thanh Duy			1650		0
2	Thiếu nhi (Children)	"Bay" [Fly] (Nguyễn Hải Phong, It's CHARLES., Binz, Rhymastic)	Quốc Thiên			1650		0
2	Thiếu nhi (Children)	"Bay" [Fly] (Nguyễn Hải Phong, It's CHARLES., Binz, Rhymastic)	Binz			1650		0
2	Thiếu nhi (Children)	"Bay" [Fly] (Nguyễn Hải Phong, It's CHARLES., Binz, Rhymastic)	Tăng Phúc			1650		0
2	Thiếu nhi (Children)	"Bay" [Fly] (Nguyễn Hải Phong, It's CHARLES., Binz, Rhymastic)	Thiên Minh			1650		0
2	Thiếu nhi (Children)	"Bay" [Fly] (Nguyễn Hải Phong, It's CHARLES., Binz, Rhymastic)	Liên Bỉnh Phát			1650		0
2	Thiếu nhi (Children)	"Bay" [Fly] (Nguyễn Hải Phong, It's CHARLES., Binz, Rhymastic)	Rhymastic			1650		0
2	Thiếu nhi (Children)	"Bay" [Fly] (Nguyễn Hải Phong, It's CHARLES., Binz, Rhymastic)	Bùi Công Nam			1650		0
2	Thiếu nhi (Children)	"Bay" [Fly] (Nguyễn Hải Phong, It's CHARLES., Binz, Rhymastic)	Duy Khánh			1650		0
Episode 13 (October 5th, 2024)
New beat round
Performance order	House [English translation]	Performance song [English translation] (Composers)	Members	Performance score	Number of elimination slot received	Total number of elimination slots received	Individual firepower points	Individual result
1	Tinh hoa (Quintessence)	"Nét" [Clear] (SOOBIN, Kay Trần, $A Milo, Touliver, Kriss Ngô)	Bằng Kiều	1990	0	1	290	Advanced
1	Tinh hoa (Quintessence)	"Nét" [Clear] (SOOBIN, Kay Trần, $A Milo, Touliver, Kriss Ngô)	Tự Long	1990	0	1	420	Advanced
1	Tinh hoa (Quintessence)	"Nét" [Clear] (SOOBIN, Kay Trần, $A Milo, Touliver, Kriss Ngô)	Phan Đinh Tùng	1990	0	1	170	Advanced
1	Tinh hoa (Quintessence)	"Nét" [Clear] (SOOBIN, Kay Trần, $A Milo, Touliver, Kriss Ngô)	Tuấn Hưng	1990	0	1	190	Advanced
1	Tinh hoa (Quintessence)	"Nét" [Clear] (SOOBIN, Kay Trần, $A Milo, Touliver, Kriss Ngô)	Trương Thế Vinh	1990	0	1	160	Eliminated
1	Tinh hoa (Quintessence)	"Nét" [Clear] (SOOBIN, Kay Trần, $A Milo, Touliver, Kriss Ngô)	Cường Seven	1990	0	1	690	Advanced
1	Tinh hoa (Quintessence)	"Nét" [Clear] (SOOBIN, Kay Trần, $A Milo, Touliver, Kriss Ngô)	Jun Phạm	1990	0	1	860	Advanced
1	Tinh hoa (Quintessence)	"Nét" [Clear] (SOOBIN, Kay Trần, $A Milo, Touliver, Kriss Ngô)	BB Trần	1990	0	1	400	Advanced
1	Tinh hoa (Quintessence)	"Nét" [Clear] (SOOBIN, Kay Trần, $A Milo, Touliver, Kriss Ngô)	S.T Sơn Thạch	1990	0	1	350	Advanced
1	Tinh hoa (Quintessence)	"Nét" [Clear] (SOOBIN, Kay Trần, $A Milo, Touliver, Kriss Ngô)	Kiên Ứng	1990	0	1	220	Advanced
1	Tinh hoa (Quintessence)	"Nét" [Clear] (SOOBIN, Kay Trần, $A Milo, Touliver, Kriss Ngô)	(S)TRONG Trọng Hiếu	1990	0	1	370	Advanced
1	Tinh hoa (Quintessence)	"Nét" [Clear] (SOOBIN, Kay Trần, $A Milo, Touliver, Kriss Ngô)	SOOBIN	1990	0	1	970	Advanced
1	Tinh hoa (Quintessence)	"Nét" [Clear] (SOOBIN, Kay Trần, $A Milo, Touliver, Kriss Ngô)	Kay Trần	1990	0	1	740	Advanced
2	Thiếu nhi (Children)	"Đỏ quên đi" [Forget being lucky] (Hà Lê, Đỗ Hoàng Hiệp, Binz, Rhymastic, Bùi Công Nam, Touliver (Nomovodka), Quân Xmas (Nomovodka), K.A (Nomovodka))	Đinh Tiến Đạt	1510	1	2	380	Advanced
2	Thiếu nhi (Children)	"Đỏ quên đi" [Forget being lucky] (Hà Lê, Đỗ Hoàng Hiệp, Binz, Rhymastic, Bùi Công Nam, Touliver (Nomovodka), Quân Xmas (Nomovodka), K.A (Nomovodka))	Tiến Luật	1510	1	2	390	Advanced
2	Thiếu nhi (Children)	"Đỏ quên đi" [Forget being lucky] (Hà Lê, Đỗ Hoàng Hiệp, Binz, Rhymastic, Bùi Công Nam, Touliver (Nomovodka), Quân Xmas (Nomovodka), K.A (Nomovodka))	Hà Lê	1510	1	2	180	Advanced
2	Thiếu nhi (Children)	"Đỏ quên đi" [Forget being lucky] (Hà Lê, Đỗ Hoàng Hiệp, Binz, Rhymastic, Bùi Công Nam, Touliver (Nomovodka), Quân Xmas (Nomovodka), K.A (Nomovodka))	Đỗ Hoàng Hiệp	1510	1	2	260	Advanced
2	Thiếu nhi (Children)	"Đỏ quên đi" [Forget being lucky] (Hà Lê, Đỗ Hoàng Hiệp, Binz, Rhymastic, Bùi Công Nam, Touliver (Nomovodka), Quân Xmas (Nomovodka), K.A (Nomovodka))	Thanh Duy	1510	1	2	630	Advanced
2	Thiếu nhi (Children)	"Đỏ quên đi" [Forget being lucky] (Hà Lê, Đỗ Hoàng Hiệp, Binz, Rhymastic, Bùi Công Nam, Touliver (Nomovodka), Quân Xmas (Nomovodka), K.A (Nomovodka))	Quốc Thiên	1510	1	2	440	Advanced
2	Thiếu nhi (Children)	"Đỏ quên đi" [Forget being lucky] (Hà Lê, Đỗ Hoàng Hiệp, Binz, Rhymastic, Bùi Công Nam, Touliver (Nomovodka), Quân Xmas (Nomovodka), K.A (Nomovodka))	Binz	1510	1	2	650	Advanced
2	Thiếu nhi (Children)	"Đỏ quên đi" [Forget being lucky] (Hà Lê, Đỗ Hoàng Hiệp, Binz, Rhymastic, Bùi Công Nam, Touliver (Nomovodka), Quân Xmas (Nomovodka), K.A (Nomovodka))	Tăng Phúc	1510	1	2	140	Eliminated
2	Thiếu nhi (Children)	"Đỏ quên đi" [Forget being lucky] (Hà Lê, Đỗ Hoàng Hiệp, Binz, Rhymastic, Bùi Công Nam, Touliver (Nomovodka), Quân Xmas (Nomovodka), K.A (Nomovodka))	Thiên Minh	1510	1	2	310	Advanced
2	Thiếu nhi (Children)	"Đỏ quên đi" [Forget being lucky] (Hà Lê, Đỗ Hoàng Hiệp, Binz, Rhymastic, Bùi Công Nam, Touliver (Nomovodka), Quân Xmas (Nomovodka), K.A (Nomovodka))	Liên Bỉnh Phát	1510	1	2	90	Eliminated
2	Thiếu nhi (Children)	"Đỏ quên đi" [Forget being lucky] (Hà Lê, Đỗ Hoàng Hiệp, Binz, Rhymastic, Bùi Công Nam, Touliver (Nomovodka), Quân Xmas (Nomovodka), K.A (Nomovodka))	Rhymastic	1510	1	2	460	Advanced
2	Thiếu nhi (Children)	"Đỏ quên đi" [Forget being lucky] (Hà Lê, Đỗ Hoàng Hiệp, Binz, Rhymastic, Bùi Công Nam, Touliver (Nomovodka), Quân Xmas (Nomovodka), K.A (Nomovodka))	Bùi Công Nam	1510	1	2	490	Advanced
2	Thiếu nhi (Children)	"Đỏ quên đi" [Forget being lucky] (Hà Lê, Đỗ Hoàng Hiệp, Binz, Rhymastic, Bùi Công Nam, Touliver (Nomovodka), Quân Xmas (Nomovodka), K.A (Nomovodka))	Duy Khánh	1510	1	2	200	Advanced

- The talented brother is the house captain
- Winning performance's score
- Returning talented brother

=== Finale: You, me become us ===
Finale
Episode 14 (October 12th, 2024)
Opening guest performance
Performance song [English translation] (Composers)			Performing artist				
"Hoa xương rồng" [Cactus flower] (Cheng, Trang Pháp, MastaL, Kriss Ngô)			LUNAS				
First round: You
Performance order	House [English translation]	Performance song [English translation] (Composers)	Performing members	Performance score			
1	Thiếu nhi (Children)	"Bống bống bang bang" (Only C, Nguyễn Phúc Thiện, Lou Hoàng, (Note: Through the confirmation of Only C, Lou Hoàng did participated in writing the lyrics for this song.); Đinh Tiến Đạt, Tiến Luật, Thanh Duy, Binz, Rhymastic, Duy Khánh)	Đinh Tiến Đạt	1650			
1	Thiếu nhi (Children)	"Bống bống bang bang" (Only C, Nguyễn Phúc Thiện, Lou Hoàng, Đinh Tiến Đạt, Tiến Luật, Thanh Duy, Binz, Rhymastic, Duy Khánh)	Tiến Luật	1650			
1	Thiếu nhi (Children)	"Bống bống bang bang" (Only C, Nguyễn Phúc Thiện, Lou Hoàng, Đinh Tiến Đạt, Tiến Luật, Thanh Duy, Binz, Rhymastic, Duy Khánh)	Thanh Duy	1650			
1	Thiếu nhi (Children)	"Bống bống bang bang" (Only C, Nguyễn Phúc Thiện, Lou Hoàng, Đinh Tiến Đạt, Tiến Luật, Thanh Duy, Binz, Rhymastic, Duy Khánh)	Quốc Thiên	1650			
1	Thiếu nhi (Children)	"Bống bống bang bang" (Only C, Nguyễn Phúc Thiện, Lou Hoàng, Đinh Tiến Đạt, Tiến Luật, Thanh Duy, Binz, Rhymastic, Duy Khánh)	Duy Khánh	1650			
2	Tinh hoa (Quintessence)	"Có không giữ mất đừng tìm" & "Gene" ["If you lost it, don't try to find it" & "Gene"] (Bùi Công Nam, Binz, TDK, Jun Phạm, APJ, It's CHARLES.)	Bằng Kiều	1850			
2	Tinh hoa (Quintessence)	"Có không giữ mất đừng tìm" & "Gene" ["If you lost it, don't try to find it" & "Gene"] (Bùi Công Nam, Binz, TDK, Jun Phạm, APJ, It's CHARLES.)	Tự Long	1850			
2	Tinh hoa (Quintessence)	"Có không giữ mất đừng tìm" & "Gene" ["If you lost it, don't try to find it" & "Gene"] (Bùi Công Nam, Binz, TDK, Jun Phạm, APJ, It's CHARLES.)	Cường Seven	1850			
2	Tinh hoa (Quintessence)	"Có không giữ mất đừng tìm" & "Gene" ["If you lost it, don't try to find it" & "Gene"] (Bùi Công Nam, Binz, TDK, Jun Phạm, APJ, It's CHARLES.)	Jun Phạm	1850			
2	Tinh hoa (Quintessence)	"Có không giữ mất đừng tìm" & "Gene" ["If you lost it, don't try to find it" & "Gene"] (Bùi Công Nam, Binz, TDK, Jun Phạm, APJ, It's CHARLES.)	BB Trần	1850			
2	Tinh hoa (Quintessence)	"Có không giữ mất đừng tìm" & "Gene" ["If you lost it, don't try to find it" & "Gene"] (Bùi Công Nam, Binz, TDK, Jun Phạm, APJ, It's CHARLES.)	S.T Sơn Thạch	1850			
Halftime guest performance
Performance song [English translation] (Composers)			Performing artist				
"Đổi thay", "Lặng thầm" & "Đùa anh đau đấy" ["Change", "Quiet" & "I'm going to hurt if you mess with me"] (Nguyễn Hoàng Duy, Tuno)			Noo Phước Thịnh				
Second round: Me
Thứ tự	Nhà lớn	Bài hát biểu diễn (Tác giả)	Thành viên	Điểm			
1	Tinh hoa (Quintessence)	"Superstar" (SOOBIN, Kay Trần, $A Milo, It's CHARLES., Touliver, MastaL, Hà Trà Đá, Duy Sơn)	Phan Đinh Tùng	1600			
1	Tinh hoa (Quintessence)	"Superstar" (SOOBIN, Kay Trần, $A Milo, It's CHARLES., Touliver, MastaL, Hà Trà Đá, Duy Sơn)	Tuấn Hưng	1600			
1	Tinh hoa (Quintessence)	"Superstar" (SOOBIN, Kay Trần, $A Milo, It's CHARLES., Touliver, MastaL, Hà Trà Đá, Duy Sơn)	Kiên Ứng	1600			
1	Tinh hoa (Quintessence)	"Superstar" (SOOBIN, Kay Trần, $A Milo, It's CHARLES., Touliver, MastaL, Hà Trà Đá, Duy Sơn)	(S)TRONG Trọng Hiếu	1600			
1	Tinh hoa (Quintessence)	"Superstar" (SOOBIN, Kay Trần, $A Milo, It's CHARLES., Touliver, MastaL, Hà Trà Đá, Duy Sơn)	SOOBIN	1600			
1	Tinh hoa (Quintessence)	"Superstar" (SOOBIN, Kay Trần, $A Milo, It's CHARLES., Touliver, MastaL, Hà Trà Đá, Duy Sơn)	Kay Trần	1600			
2	Thiếu nhi (Children)	"Quá là trôi" [Too smooth] (Hà Lê, Đỗ Hoàng Hiệp, Binz, Rhymastic, Bùi Công Nam, Touliver)	Hà Lê	1900			
2	Thiếu nhi (Children)	"Quá là trôi" [Too smooth] (Hà Lê, Đỗ Hoàng Hiệp, Binz, Rhymastic, Bùi Công Nam, Touliver)	Đỗ Hoàng Hiệp	1900			
2	Thiếu nhi (Children)	"Quá là trôi" [Too smooth] (Hà Lê, Đỗ Hoàng Hiệp, Binz, Rhymastic, Bùi Công Nam, Touliver)	Binz	1900			
2	Thiếu nhi (Children)	"Quá là trôi" [Too smooth] (Hà Lê, Đỗ Hoàng Hiệp, Binz, Rhymastic, Bùi Công Nam, Touliver)	Thiên Minh	1900			
2	Thiếu nhi (Children)	"Quá là trôi" [Too smooth] (Hà Lê, Đỗ Hoàng Hiệp, Binz, Rhymastic, Bùi Công Nam, Touliver)	Rhymastic	1900			
2	Thiếu nhi (Children)	"Quá là trôi" [Too smooth] (Hà Lê, Đỗ Hoàng Hiệp, Binz, Rhymastic, Bùi Công Nam, Touliver)	Bùi Công Nam	1900			
Episode 15 (October 19th, 2024)
Eliminated talented brothers' performances
Performance song [English translation] (Composers)			Performing artists				
"Em còn nhớ anh không?" [Do you still remember me?] (Hoàng Tôn, Neko Lê, HuyR)			Thành Trung, Nguyễn Trần Duy Nhất, Neko Lê, Tăng Phúc, HuyR (featuring Mỹ Mỹ)				
"Chiếc lá tình yêu" [The leaf of love] (Bùi Anh Dũng, Phạm Khánh Hưng, Đăng Khôi, 7ean)			Hồng Sơn, Phạm Khánh Hưng, Đăng Khôi, Trương Thế Vinh, Liên Bỉnh Phát				
Third round: We
Performance order	House [English translation]	Performance song [English translation] (Composers)	Members	Performance score	Number of debut slots received	Individual firepower points	Final individual result
1	Tinh hoa (Quintessence)	"Mẹ yêu con" [Mom loves her child] (Nguyễn Văn Tý, Binz, SOOBIN)	Bằng Kiều	3220	9	508	Debuted successfully
1	Tinh hoa (Quintessence)	"Mẹ yêu con" [Mom loves her child] (Nguyễn Văn Tý, Binz, SOOBIN)	Tự Long	3220	9	712	Debuted successfully
1	Tinh hoa (Quintessence)	"Mẹ yêu con" [Mom loves her child] (Nguyễn Văn Tý, Binz, SOOBIN)	Phan Đinh Tùng	3220	9	214	Debuted unsuccessfully
1	Tinh hoa (Quintessence)	"Mẹ yêu con" [Mom loves her child] (Nguyễn Văn Tý, Binz, SOOBIN)	Tuấn Hưng	3220	9	270	Debuted unsuccessfully
1	Tinh hoa (Quintessence)	"Mẹ yêu con" [Mom loves her child] (Nguyễn Văn Tý, Binz, SOOBIN)	Cường Seven	3220	9	799	Debuted successfully
1	Tinh hoa (Quintessence)	"Mẹ yêu con" [Mom loves her child] (Nguyễn Văn Tý, Binz, SOOBIN)	Jun Phạm	3220	9	1087	Debuted successfully
1	Tinh hoa (Quintessence)	"Mẹ yêu con" [Mom loves her child] (Nguyễn Văn Tý, Binz, SOOBIN)	BB Trần	3220	9	556	Debuted successfully
1	Tinh hoa (Quintessence)	"Mẹ yêu con" [Mom loves her child] (Nguyễn Văn Tý, Binz, SOOBIN)	S.T Sơn Thạch	3220	9	580	Debuted successfully
1	Tinh hoa (Quintessence)	"Mẹ yêu con" [Mom loves her child] (Nguyễn Văn Tý, Binz, SOOBIN)	Kiên Ứng	3220	9	163	Debuted unsuccessfully
1	Tinh hoa (Quintessence)	"Mẹ yêu con" [Mom loves her child] (Nguyễn Văn Tý, Binz, SOOBIN)	(S)TRONG Trọng Hiếu	3220	9	598	Debuted successfully
1	Tinh hoa (Quintessence)	"Mẹ yêu con" [Mom loves her child] (Nguyễn Văn Tý, Binz, SOOBIN)	SOOBIN	3220	9	1141	Debuted successfully
1	Tinh hoa (Quintessence)	"Mẹ yêu con" [Mom loves her child] (Nguyễn Văn Tý, Binz, SOOBIN)	Kay Trần	3220	9	1121	Debuted successfully
2	Thiếu nhi (Children)	"Dòng thời gian" [Timeline] (Nguyễn Hải Phong, Đinh Tiến Đạt, Tiến Luật, Hà Lê, Thanh Duy, Binz, Thiên Minh, Rhymastic, Bùi Công Nam, Duy Khánh)	Đinh Tiến Đạt	3170	8	346	Debuted successfully
2	Thiếu nhi (Children)	"Dòng thời gian" [Timeline] (Nguyễn Hải Phong, Đinh Tiến Đạt, Tiến Luật, Hà Lê, Thanh Duy, Binz, Thiên Minh, Rhymastic, Bùi Công Nam, Duy Khánh)	Tiến Luật	3170	8	352	Debuted successfully
2	Thiếu nhi (Children)	"Dòng thời gian" [Timeline] (Nguyễn Hải Phong, Đinh Tiến Đạt, Tiến Luật, Hà Lê, Thanh Duy, Binz, Thiên Minh, Rhymastic, Bùi Công Nam, Duy Khánh)	Hà Lê	3170	8	256	Debuted unsuccessfully
2	Thiếu nhi (Children)	"Dòng thời gian" [Timeline] (Nguyễn Hải Phong, Đinh Tiến Đạt, Tiến Luật, Hà Lê, Thanh Duy, Binz, Thiên Minh, Rhymastic, Bùi Công Nam, Duy Khánh)	Đỗ Hoàng Hiệp	3170	8	333	Debuted successfully
2	Thiếu nhi (Children)	"Dòng thời gian" [Timeline] (Nguyễn Hải Phong, Đinh Tiến Đạt, Tiến Luật, Hà Lê, Thanh Duy, Binz, Thiên Minh, Rhymastic, Bùi Công Nam, Duy Khánh)	Thanh Duy	3170	8	561	Debuted successfully
2	Thiếu nhi (Children)	"Dòng thời gian" [Timeline] (Nguyễn Hải Phong, Đinh Tiến Đạt, Tiến Luật, Hà Lê, Thanh Duy, Binz, Thiên Minh, Rhymastic, Bùi Công Nam, Duy Khánh)	Quốc Thiên	3170	8	563	Debuted successfully
2	Thiếu nhi (Children)	"Dòng thời gian" [Timeline] (Nguyễn Hải Phong, Đinh Tiến Đạt, Tiến Luật, Hà Lê, Thanh Duy, Binz, Thiên Minh, Rhymastic, Bùi Công Nam, Duy Khánh)	Binz	3170	8	866	Debuted successfully
2	Thiếu nhi (Children)	"Dòng thời gian" [Timeline] (Nguyễn Hải Phong, Đinh Tiến Đạt, Tiến Luật, Hà Lê, Thanh Duy, Binz, Thiên Minh, Rhymastic, Bùi Công Nam, Duy Khánh)	Thiên Minh	3170	8	246	Debuted unsuccessfully
2	Thiếu nhi (Children)	"Dòng thời gian" [Timeline] (Nguyễn Hải Phong, Đinh Tiến Đạt, Tiến Luật, Hà Lê, Thanh Duy, Binz, Thiên Minh, Rhymastic, Bùi Công Nam, Duy Khánh)	Rhymastic	3170	8	592	Debuted successfully
2	Thiếu nhi (Children)	"Dòng thời gian" [Timeline] (Nguyễn Hải Phong, Đinh Tiến Đạt, Tiến Luật, Hà Lê, Thanh Duy, Binz, Thiên Minh, Rhymastic, Bùi Công Nam, Duy Khánh)	Bùi Công Nam	3170	8	732	Debuted successfully
2	Thiếu nhi (Children)	"Dòng thời gian" [Timeline] (Nguyễn Hải Phong, Đinh Tiến Đạt, Tiến Luật, Hà Lê, Thanh Duy, Binz, Thiên Minh, Rhymastic, Bùi Công Nam, Duy Khánh)	Duy Khánh	3170	8	325	Debuted unsuccessfully
Special performance
Performance song [English translation] (Composers)			Performing artist				
"Hỏa ca (Call Me by Fire)" & "Trái Đất tròn" ["Fire song (Call Me by Fire)" & "A round Earth"] (It's CHARLES., Hải Bột, Đinh Tiến Đạt, Binz, Neko Lê, Rhymastic, Touliver, GRVITY, Tinle, SlimV, Hà Trà Đá, Duy Sơn)			Anh trai vượt ngàn chông gai 2024's cast				

- The talented brother is the house captain
- Winning performance's score

== Elimination order and individual firepower points scoreboard ==
Performance round	First stage concert (Ep 1-2)		First performance round (Ep 3-4)	Second performance round (Ep 5-6)		Third performance round (Ep 5-6)		Fourth performance round (Ep 5-6)		Fifth performance round (Ep 5-6)		Finale (Ep 5-6)	
Performance round	Additional firepower points (performance score)	Individual firepower points	Result (Performance score)	Điểm tiết mục	Individual firepower points	Result (Performance score)	Individual firepower points (Note: The brothers in the safe house don't have their firepower points being public)	Result (Performance score)	Individual firepower points (Note: The eliminated brothers don't have their firepower points being public)	Result (Performance score)	Individual firepower points	Result	Individual firepower points
Talented brother	Result												
SOOBIN	300 (1190)	780	Advanced (1490)	Advanced (4620)	790	Advanced (3530)	—	Advanced (3790)	1130	Advanced (5560)	970	All-rounded family	1141
Kay Trần	0 (1100)	520	Advanced (1060)	Advanced (3350)	750	Advanced (3510)	—	Advanced (5620)	860	Advanced (5560)	740	All-rounded family	1121
Jun Phạm	300 (1170)	850	Advanced (1660)	Advanced (2710)	1210	Advanced (3530)	—	Advanced (3790)	690	Advanced (5560)	860	All-rounded family	1087
Binz	300 (1290)	710	Advanced (1680)	Advanced (2920)	290	Advanced (3410)	610	Advanced (6060)	540	Advanced (4940)	650	All-rounded family	866
Cường Seven	0 (440)	230	Advanced (1490)	Advanced (4620)	170	Advanced (3530)	—	Advanced (3790)	680	Advanced (5560)	690	All-rounded family	799
Bùi Công Nam	0 (460)	220	Advanced (1750)	Advanced (2920)	430	Advanced (3510)	—	Advanced (5620)	340	Advanced (4940)	490	All-rounded family	732
Tự Long	0 (830)	160	Advanced (1490)	Advanced (4620)	280	Advanced (3530)	—	Advanced (3790)	630	Advanced (5560)	420	All-rounded family	712
(S)TRONG Trọng Hiếu	0 (300)	230	Advanced (760)	Advanced (3350)	220	Advanced (3530)	—	Advanced (3790)	360	Advanced (5560)	370	All-rounded family	598
Rhymastic	0 (970)	330	Advanced (900)	Advanced (4620)	150	Advanced (3410)	260	Advanced (6060)	400	Advanced (4940)	460	All-rounded family	592
S.T Sơn Thạch	0 (810)	450	Advanced (1680)	Advanced (2920)	930	Advanced (3510)	—	Advanced (5620)	270	Advanced (5560)	350	All-rounded family	580
Quốc Thiên	300 (1390)	540	Advanced (650)	Advanced (4620)	210	Advanced (3410)	290	Advanced (6060)	560	Advanced (4940)	440	All-rounded family	563
Thanh Duy	0 (460)	250	Advanced (1750)	Advanced (2920)	420	Advanced (3530)	—	Advanced (3790)	290	Advanced (4940)	630	All-rounded family	561
BB Trần	300 (880)	880	Advanced (1660)	Advanced (2710)	680	Advanced (3510)	—	Advanced (5620)	370	Advanced (5560)	400	All-rounded family	556
Bằng Kiều	0 (470)	130	Advanced (1680)	Advanced (2920)	130	Advanced (3470)	300	Thăng cấp (3680)	190	Advanced (5560)	290	All-rounded family	508
Tiến Luật	300 (960)	760	Advanced (900)	Advanced (4620)	340	Advanced (3410)	780	Advanced (6060)	650	Advanced (4940)	390	All-rounded family	352
Đinh Tiến Đạt	0 (340)	210	Advanced (900)	Advanced (4620)	150	Advanced (3410)	210	Advanced (6060)	320	Advanced (4940)	380	All-rounded family	346
Đỗ Hoàng Hiệp	0 (520)	100	Advanced (650)	Advanced (2710)	170	Advanced (3470)	520	Advanced (3680)	330	Advanced (4940)	260	All-rounded family	333
Duy Khánh	0 (710)	440	Advanced (1750)	Advanced (2920)	450	Advanced (3410)	230	Advanced (6060)	180	Advanced (4940)	200	Final 23	325
Tuấn Hưng	300 (1260)	480	Advanced (760)	Advanced (4620)	80	Advanced (3530)	—	Advanced (3790)	210	Advanced (5560)	190	Final 23	270
Hà Lê	0 (330)	160	Advanced (650)	Advanced (2710)	180	Eliminated (3410)	150			Advanced (4940)	180	Final 23	256
Thiên Minh	0 (470)	260	Advanced (1750)	Advanced (2920)	100	Advanced (3510)	—	Advanced (5620)	350	Advanced (4940)	310	Final 23	246
Phan Đinh Tùng	300 (1390)	440	Advanced (1060)	Advanced (3350)	350	Advanced (3470)	310	Advanced (3680)	160	Advanced (5560)	170	Final 23	214
Kiên Ứng	0 (230)	260	Advanced (650)	Eliminated (2710)	90					Advanced (5560)	220	Final 23	163
Trương Thế Vinh	0 (530)	370	Advanced (1660)	Advanced (2710)	370	Advanced (3470)	230	Advanced (3680)	230	Eliminated (5560)	160		
Tăng Phúc	0 (480)	190	Advanced (1060)	Advanced (3350)	170	Advanced (3510)	—	Advanced (5620)	150	Eliminated (4940)	140		
Liên Bỉnh Phát	0 (680)	250	Advanced (760)	Advanced (3350)	40	Advanced (3510)	—	Advanced (5620)	130	Eliminated (4940)	90		
Neko Lê	0 (510)	380	Advanced (1060)	Advanced (3350)	460	Advanced (3510)	—	Eliminated (5620)	—				
Đăng Khôi	0 (1150)	220	Advanced (1060)	Advanced (3350)	140	Advanced (3530)	—	Eliminated (3790)	—				
Nguyễn Trần Duy Nhất	0 (440)	200	Advanced (760)	Advanced (3350)	200	Advanced (3470)	220	Eliminated (3680)	—				
Phạm Khánh Hưng	0 (550)	140	Advanced (1660)	Advanced (2710)	80	Advanced (3470)	50	Eliminated (3680)	—				
Hồng Sơn	0 (390)	130	Advanced (1680)	Advanced (2920)	90	Eliminated (3470)	110						
HuyR	0 (230)	130	Advanced (1660)	Eliminated (2710)	40								
Thành Trung	0 (1050)	80	Advanced (650)	Eliminated (2710)	40								

- The brother was in the safe house/alliance for the performance round.
- The brother was in the danger house/alliance but was safe based on their personal firepower points or their votes to stay from other brothers
- The brother was eliminated but was later resurrected based on the remaining brothers' votes
- The brother was in the danger zone and got eliminated
- The brother did not participate in the performance round due to them being eliminated prior.
- All-rounded family The brother successfully debuted and join the "All-rounded family"
- Final 23 The brother is a finalist but unsuccessfully debuted to join the "All-rounded family"

== Notes ==
1. LUNAS is composed of members: Trang Pháp, Diệp Lâm Anh, Huyền Baby, Khổng Tú Quỳnh, Ninh Dương Lan Ngọc
2. Episode 4 was delayed to air a week after the original date to allow for the airing of the national funeral of the Vietnamese's General Secretary Nguyễn Phú Trọng
3. During the filming of the house choosing process, Duy Nhất was absent due to his schedule to prepare for the ONE Championship. Because of such, his house for the 1st performance round was determined by the producers. The producers have placed him in the Passion house
4. Through the confirmation of Only C, Lou Hoàng did participated in writing the lyrics for this song.
5. The brothers in the safe house don't have their firepower points being public
6. The eliminated brothers don't have their firepower points being public
