= Microwaves (disambiguation) =

Microwaves are electromagnetic waves with wavelengths ranging from as long as one meter to as short as one millimeter.

Microwave or Microwaves may also refer to:

- Microwave oven, or simply "microwave", a kitchen appliance that cooks or heats food by dielectric heating
- Cosmic microwave background radiation (CMBR), a form of electromagnetic radiation that fills the universe
- Microwave chemistry, the science of applying microwave irradiation to chemical reactions
- Microwave landing system (MLS), an all-weather, precision aircraft landing system
- Microwave spectroscopy, studies the absorption and emission of microwave electromagnetic radiation
- Microwave transmission, the technology of transmitting information using microwaves by employing various electronic technologies

== People ==
- Vinnie Johnson (born 1956), nicknamed "the Microwave", American former basketball player

== Music ==
- Microwave (American band)
- Microwave (Vietnamese band)

== See also ==
- Dielectric heating
- Electromagnetic radiation
- Maser
- Parabolic antenna
- Radar
- Waveguide
