= Rhymastic =

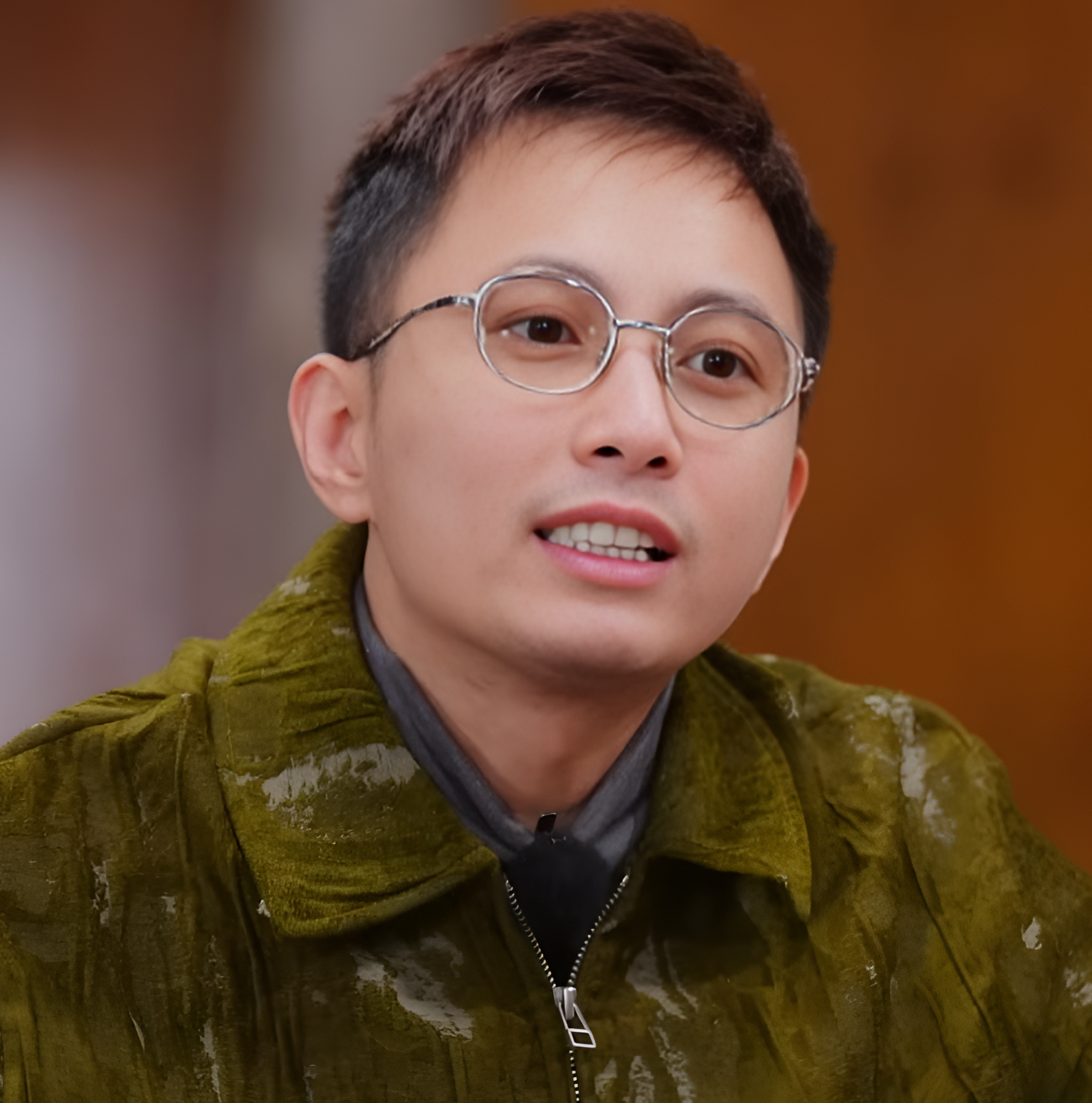
- Rhymastic in 2025
- Born: Vũ Đức Thiện; April 8, 1991 (age 35); Hanoi, Vietnam
- Other name: Young Crizzal (YC)
- Education: Hanoi University of Architecture
- Occupations: Rapper; Singer; Songwriter; Record producer
- Years active: 2005–present
- Awards: List
- Musical career
- Origin: Hanoi, Vietnam; Ho Chi Minh City, Vietnam
- Genres: V-pop; R&B; hip-hop; dance-pop; EDM
- Instruments: Vocals; organ; piano; synth
- Label: SpaceSpeakers

Vũ Đức Thiện (born April 8, 1991), better known by his stage names Rhymastic or YC, is a Vietnamese rapper, singer, songwriter, and record producer. He is currently a member of SpaceSpeakers.

== Life and career ==
=== Early life ===
Rhymastic was born Vũ Đức Thiện and grew up in a family where his parents were ordinary civil servants but highly educated. His paternal grandfather was a literature teacher who passed down knowledge of Hán characters and poetry to him. He has stated that he was heavily influenced by his family and their intellectual lineage. During elementary school, a neighbor visited and, noticing his beautiful hands, advised the family to enroll him in music lessons. His family subsequently took him to learn the organ, giving him early exposure to sound. In middle school, his older brother took him to a hip-hop club in Hanoi. After witnessing the performances, Thiện was deeply impressed by the genre. Back home, he studied it further, learning from rappers on channels like MTV and searching the internet to understand rap lyrics, how artists worked, and what they composed. Thiện considers 2Pac and Eminem his inspirations at the time. He once composed a rap segment for the skit "Alo 123" by People's Artist Công Lý and was paid 200,000 VND: "That was the first money I ever earned from music; I was very happy and proud."

In 2006, Thiện took the stage name Young Crizzal (YC), began performing hip-hop, and joined the GVR rap community. During this period, he spent most of his time researching rap and teaching himself new skills alongside other GVR members. In 2008, he entered the "Đường lên đỉnh GVR" competition and won, becoming an exclusive rapper for GVR. The following year, he changed his stage name from Young Crizzal to Rhymastic and transitioned into professional work by experimenting with and perfecting his recording, vocal processing, and songwriting skills. He graduated from the Hanoi University of Architecture and worked at the M4Me studio with artists like JustaTee and Young Uno. He described the job as simply pressing record for clients for a salary that was "enough for pocket money and iced tea." However, Rhymastic noted that this was an opportunity to learn about music and "build a massive foundation of sound knowledge."

=== Career ===
On October 31, 2011, SpaceSpeakers was founded, and Rhymastic became one of the group's original faces. In 2013, after Karik faced heavy criticism from the underground scene for deciding to go mainstream, Rhymastic, along with Binz and BigDaddy, spoke out in his defense. This led to several "beefs" between Rhymastic and rappers with differing ideologies. During this time, Rhymastic also had disagreements with GVR member Linh Lam and officially left the group to focus on SpaceSpeakers.

In 2016, a conflict between Rhymastic and B Ray led to a rap battle. He released several diss tracks in response to B Ray, such as "Bản Kiểm Điểm," "Ngược Đời," "B Ray Dissin," and "Ếch Báo Dissin." Rhymastic competed in the second season of "The Remix" as the music producer for Team 04 (alongside members Soobin Hoàng Sơn, Antei Ngọc Thịnh, and Gin).

In 2017, he released "Yêu 5," which received positive feedback from the music industry and ranked high on Zing MP3. At the end of the year, Rhymastic participated in "Sao đại chiến" as a producer, partnering with singer Hoàng Tôn. The show featured singers, bands, and producers challenged with reinventing old songs. He had a heated debate with Dương Cầm during a live broadcast.

In 2019, he was invited to be a judge for the Beck'Stage battle.

In the following years, Rhymastic continuously released products offering multi-dimensional perspectives on life. In a 2020 interview with Billboard Vietnam, he stated he would limit his participation in personal rap beefs because "as you get older, the time you have for those things gets narrower and narrower."

Also in 2020, Rhymastic became a judge on the show Rap Việt.

Rhymastic also composes for other singers, including "Sâu trong em" (Bích Phương), "Nơi ta chờ em" (Will), "Let Me Feel Your Love Tonight" (Trà My Idol), and "Tình yêu tuyệt vời" (S.T Sơn Thạch).

In 2024, Rhymastic appeared in the reality music show Call Me by Fire Vietnam, winning the "King Of X-Part" award and becoming a member of the "Gia tộc toàn năng" (All-Powerful Family) lineup.

In 2025, Rhymastic became a main member of "Gia đình Haha"—a reality TV show promoting the unique cultures of various regions in Vietnam.

On October 22 of the same year, he released his debut full-length album, "Đâu ai yêu nghệ thuật đến thế" (Who Loves Art That Much). The album consists of 10 tracks, representing Rhymastic's journey of questioning the true value of art and fame, and the sacrifices an artist makes while overcoming loneliness, pressure, and temptation to maintain their true self. This project was nurtured by Rhymastic for many years, marking the first time he fully exposed his inner world and his gritty alter ego, YC.

== Controversy ==
In 2020, the simultaneous debut of two rap talent shows, Rap Việt and King of Rap, inadvertently sparked intense and unnecessary debates within the rap community. In October, Rhymastic made comments that were perceived as belittling King of Rap, despite having previously spoken out against comparing the two shows. A few hours after the incident, Rhymastic publicly apologized to the entire King of Rap crew as well as rap fans, while also agreeing to settle things through music if requested.

== Personal life ==
In 2018, Rhymastic officially married Lai Thanh Huyen after their engagement ceremony. They held their wedding on April 10, 2019. On July 11, 2020, the couple had their first child, Vu Uy Vu, nicknamed Ma Bu.

== Discography ==
=== Studio albums ===
Release date	Title	Tracklist
10/22/2025	Đâu Ai Yêu Nghệ Thuật Đến Thế	Tiền Tươi; Thì Sao? (ft. Touliver); Funk You Up; All The Fans; Câu Đùa Nhạt; Cảnh Giác (ft. Lil Wuyn); Đâu Ai Yêu Nghệ Thuật Đến Thế; Same Shiet Day Diff; Liều (ft. Touliver); Khó Hơn

=== EPs (Extended plays) ===
Release date	Title	Tracklist	Format
11/12/2022	Lov6	Y6u (Yêu 6); Líu La Líu Lo; Side Effect (ft. B-Wine & Touliver); Ngổn ngang; Vẫn Yêu; Thêm Đứa Nữa	Cassette

=== Compositions ===
Year	Song Title	Release Date	Artist	Notes
Around 2002–2006	Rap verse in the skit "Alo 123"		Công Lý	Composed during middle school
2012	Cần	September 19, 2012	Rhymastic, Soobin Hoàng Sơn	
2013	Vẽ Khói	December 10, 2013	Rhymastic, Onionn	MV was removed from YouTube following an official dispatch regarding music activity regulation
2014	D.C.M.E	May 1, 2014	Hoàng Touliver, Andree Right Hand, Rhymastic	
2016	Người Và Ta	2016	Rhymastic, Thanh Huyền	
2016	Nếu Như Một Ngày	August 7, 2016	MIN, Rhymastic	
2016	Let Me Feel Your Love Tonight	September 16, 2016	Trà My Idol	
2016	Từng Ngày Em Mơ Về Anh	July 26, 2016	MLee, Soobin Hoàng Sơn	
2017	Em Là Của Anh	March 10, 2017	S.T Sơn Thạch	Song from episode 8 of The Remix (Season 3)
2017	Nơi Ta Chờ Em	April 28, 2017	Will	Song from the movie Em chưa 18 (Jailbait)
2017	Yêu 5	May 20, 2017	Rhymastic	
2017	Khi Ta Có Nhau	June 18, 2017	Will	
2017	Vinh Quang Đang Chờ Ta	July 27, 2017	Touliver, Rhymastic, SOOBIN	Official song of Garena Arena of Valor in Vietnam In 2019, this song was reused to cheer for the Vietnam sports delegation at the 30th SEA Games
2017	Ngày Trôi Qua Nhanh	July 29, 2017	Anh Tú Atus	
2017	Treasure	August 23, 2017	Rhymastic	
2017	September Flower	October 3, 2017	Trà My Idol, Hoàng Touliver	
2017	Hai Thế Giới	December 25, 2017	Will	
2018	Khi Màn Hình Tắt	April 10, 2018	Rhymastic	
2018	Phán Xét	August 8, 2018	Rhymastic	
2018	Nến Và Hoa	August 19, 2018	Rhymastic	
2018	Đây Là Việt Nam	November 15, 2018	Rhymastic, Blacka	Cheering song for the 3 Vietnamese teams at the Arena of Valor International Championship 2018, co-written with Blacka
2018	Tình Yêu Tuyệt Vời (Perfect Love)	December 17, 2018	S.T Sơn Thạch	
2018	Everyday	May 8, 2018	SpaceSpeakers	Co-written with JustaTee
2019	Trên Lầu Cao	February 12, 2019	Rhymastic	
2019	Ride the Tide	June 26, 2019	Rhymastic, Kimmese	Official song of Arena of Valor World Cup 2019
2019	Ngọn Đuốc Đêm	July 27, 2019	Rhymastic	
2019	Lang Thang	December 31, 2019	Rhymastic	
2020	Vinh Quang và Nước Mắt	February 10, 2020	Giang Phạm	Official song of Viettel 5G Arena of Valor Spring 2020
2020	Vì Một Việt Nam	February 19, 2020	Hoàng Touliver, Soobin Hoàng Sơn	
2020	Nụ Cười	April 7, 2020	Rhymastic	
2020	Cảm Ơn Bạn	May 30, 2020	Hoàng Thuỳ Linh	
2020	Giàu Sang	June 23, 2020	Rhymastic	
2020	Cứ Chill Thôi	July 11, 2020	Chillies, Suni Hạ Linh	
2020	Tượng	November 16, 2020	Rhymastic	Rap battle with Lê Quý Kỳ Phong (Torai9)
2020	Let Victory Make History	November 20, 2020	Rhymastic, GDucky	Official song of Arena of Valor International Championship 2020
2021	Cả Ngàn Lời Chúc	January 7, 2021	Suboi, Rhymastic	
2021	Túi Ba Gang	January 10, 2021	Phương Ly, Rhymastic	
2021	Cả Nhà Lên Chức	January 27, 2021	Rhymastic	
2021	Bị Bass Bỏ Bùa	June 19, 2021	Rhymastic, Trấn Thành	Song from Rap Việt All-Star 2021
2021	Freaky Squad	November 30, 2021	SOOBIN, Binz, Rhymastic, Hoàng Touliver	Co-written with Binz and Hoàng Touliver
2024	Hỏa Ca	June 28, 2024	33 male artists in Call Me by Fire	Theme song of the show Call Me by Fire Wrote rap lyrics with Đinh Tiến Đạt, Binz, Neko Lê for the composition by It's Charles
2024	Lặng	July 6, 2024	Rhymastic	Performed in the show Call Me by Fire Season 1
2024	Khiến Nó Ngầu	July 6, 2024	Rhymastic, Đinh Tiến Đạt, Hà Lê, Binz	Co-written with Đinh Tiến Đạt and Binz while participating in the show Call Me by Fire Season 1
2024	Chợt Nghe Bước Em Về	August 3, 2024	Rhymastic, People's Artist Tự Long, Đinh Tiến Đạt, Quốc Thiên, Cường Seven, SOOBIN	Wrote additional rap lyrics for the composition by Quốc Vượng while participating in the show Call Me by Fire Season 1
2024	Những Kẻ Mộng Mơ	August 10, 2024	Rhymastic, People's Artist Tự Long, Tuấn Hưng, Quốc Thiên, Tiến Luật, SOOBIN	Wrote additional rap lyrics and new lyrics for the composition by Nguyễn Bảo Trọng while participating in the show Call Me by Fire Season 1
2024	Thu Hoài	August 24, 2024	Rhymastic, Đinh Tiến Đạt, Hà Lê, Quốc Thiên, Tiến Luật	Wrote additional rap lyrics for the composition by 14 Casper and Hoài Thanh while participating in the show Call Me by Fire Season 1
2024	Đêm Cô Đơn	September 7, 2024	Rhymastic, Quốc Thiên	Wrote additional rap lyrics and new lyrics for the composition by Trung Kiên while participating in the show Call Me by Fire Season 1
2024	Bay	September 28, 2024	Rhymastic, Đinh Tiến Đạt, Đỗ Hoàng Hiệp, Thanh Duy, Quốc Thiên, Tăng Phúc, Liên Bỉnh Phát, Thiên Minh, Duy Khánh	Wrote additional rap lyrics with Binz for the composition by Nguyễn Hải Phong while participating in the show Call Me by Fire Season 1
2024	Đỏ Quên Đi	October 5, 2024	Rhymastic, Đinh Tiến Đạt, Đỗ Hoàng Hiệp, Thanh Duy, Quốc Thiên, Tăng Phúc, Liên Bỉnh Phát, Thiên Minh, Duy Khánh, Tiến Luật, Hà Lê, Bùi Công Nam	Co-written with Binz, Bùi Công Nam, Hà Lê, Đỗ Hoàng Hiệp while participating in the show Call Me by Fire Season 1
2024	Bống Bống Bang Bang	October 12, 2024	Đinh Tiến Đạt, Tiến Luật, Thanh Duy, Quốc Thiên, Duy Khánh	Wrote new lyrics with Binz with rap lyrics written by Tiến Luật, Đinh Tiến Đạt, Thanh Duy, Duy Khánh for the music composition by Only C, Nguyễn Phúc Thiện and lyrics by Lou Hoàng while participating in the show Call Me by Fire Season 1
2024	Quá Là Trôi	October 12, 2024	Đỗ Hoàng Hiệp, Binz, Rhymastic, Thiên Minh, Hà Lê, Bùi Công Nam	Co-written with Đỗ Hoàng Hiệp, Binz, Rhymastic, Hà Lê, Bùi Công Nam while participating in the show Call Me by Fire Season 1
2024	SKYNote (Thiên Thanh)	October 13, 2024	Quốc Thiên	Debuted at Quốc Thiên's SKYNote concert in Hanoi
2024	Nụ Cười Khoẻ	December 29, 2024	Rhymastic, Dương Hoàng Yến, Ma Bư	
2025	Giữ Sức Khỏe Em Ơi	February 8, 2025	Đông Nhi, Rhymastic	
2025	Những Ngày Trời Bao La	June 12, 2025	Rhymastic, Bùi Công Nam, Jun Phạm, Ngọc Thanh Tâm, Duy Khánh	Theme song of the show Gia đình Haha (Haha Family) Composed by Bùi Công Nam, rap lyrics by Rhymastic
2025	Sẽ Quên Em Nhanh Thôi	July 4, 2025	SOOBIN, Rhymastic	Wrote additional rap lyrics for the composition by SOOBIN, debuted at SOOBIN's ALL-rOUNDER concert on May 26 and 27
2025	Vị Thần Tí Hon	July 5, 2025	Rhymastic, Bùi Công Nam, Jun Phạm	Co-written with Bùi Công Nam and Jun Phạm, appeared in episode 4 of the show Gia đình Haha
2025	Kho Báu	August 14, 2025	(S)TRONG Trọng Hiếu, Rhymastic	Wrote additional rap lyrics for the composition by J4RDIN, Dlight
2025	Thì Sao?	October 9, 2025	Rhymastic	
2025	Chưa Từng Cheer Ly	October 10, 2025	Rhymastic	MV was removed from YouTube following an official dispatch regarding music activity regulation
2025	Phí Cái Dép Lào	October 11, 2025	Rhymastic	
2025	Nhan Sax	December 15, 2025	Rhymastic, Bùi Lan Hương, Nguyễn Quang Dũng	

== Awards and nominations ==
Year	Award	Category	Nomination	Result	Note	Ref
2017	Làn Sóng Xanh	Top 10 Most Popular Songs	"Yêu 5"	Won		
2017	Làn Sóng Xanh	Single of the year	"Hôm nay tôi cô đơn quá"	Nominated	With Tóc Tiên, composed by Hứa Kim Tuyền	
2017	Làn Sóng Xanh	Music arrangement and production	"Hôm nay tôi cô đơn quá"	Nominated	With Tóc Tiên, composed by Hứa Kim Tuyền	
2018	Giải thưởng Âm nhạc Cống hiến	Composer of the Year		Nominated		
2018	Giải thưởng Âm nhạc Cống hiến	Song of the Year	"Hôm nay tôi cô đơn quá"	Nominated	With Tóc Tiên, composed by Hứa Kim Tuyền	
2018	Giải thưởng Âm nhạc Cống hiến	Musician of the Year		Nominated		
2018	Zing Music Awards	Top 10 singers of the Year		Won		
2018	Zing Music Awards	Top 5 favorites of the Year	"Yêu 5"	Won		
2018	Zing Music Awards	Top 5 singers of the Year		Won		
2018	Zing Music Awards	Top 5 Favorite Dance/Electronic Songs	"Yêu 5"	Won		
2018	Zing Music Awards	Top 10 ca khúc Dance/Electronic được yêu thích	"Vinh Quang Đang Chờ Ta"	Nominated	With SOOBIN, composed by Hoàng Touliver	
2018	Zing Music Awards	Top 5 Favorite R&B/Soul Songs	"Treasure"	Nominated		
2018	Zing Music Awards	Top 10 Favorite Male Singers		Nominated		
2026	Làn Sóng Xanh	Viral song	"Kho báu"	Nominated	With (S)TRONG Trọng Hiếu, composed by J4RDIN, Dlight, Rhymastic	
2026	WeChoice Awards 2025	Song of the Year	"Kho báu"	Nominated	With (S)TRONG Trọng Hiếu, composed by J4RDIN, Dlight, Rhymastic	
2026	WeChoice Awards 2025	Song of the Year	"Giữ anh cho ngày hôm qua"	Nominated	With Hoàng Dũng	
2026	WeChoice Awards 2025	Favorite singer/Rapper		Nominated		
