= Bằng Kiều =

Vietnamese singer

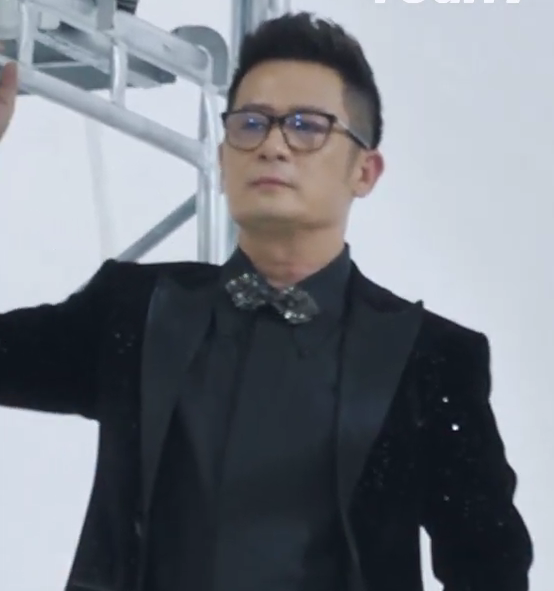
- Bằng Kiều in 2024

Background information
- Born: Nguyễn Bằng Kiều; 13 July 1973 (age 53); Hanoi, North Vietnam
- Origin: Hanoi, Vietnam
- Genre: Ballad
- Occupation: singer
- Instruments: Singing
- Years active: 1989–present
- Label: Thúy Nga Productions
- Formerly of: Chìa Khóa Vàng (1990–1996); Hoa Sữa (1990–1996); Quả Dưa Hấu (1998–2000)

Nguyễn Bằng Kiều (Note: In this Vietnamese name, the surname is Nguyễn, but is often simplified to Nguyen in English-language text. In accordance with Vietnamese custom, this person should be referred to by the given name, Bằng Kiều.) (born 13 July 1973 in Hanoi), is a Vietnamese ballad singer.

He is a former member of bands including Golden Keys, Frangipani, and Watermelon. In 2000, he became a solo artist. In 2002, he relocated to America and married female singer Trizzie Phuong Trinh. From 2004 to 2008, his Vietnam citizenship was revoked due to an unresolved dispute. Today, he is one of the exclusive singers of Thuy Nga Center.

He is a tenor. His contemporaries include Lam Truong, Minh Thuan, Phuong Thanh, My Linh, Duong Chi Linh, Quang Linh and Minh Tuyet. In September 2012, he visited Vietnam and was granted allowance perform from October to December 2012 by the Bureau of Art Performance.

In 2024, he participated in the reality TV show Call Me by Fire.

== Early life ==
Bằng Kiều is the youngest son of his father's third wife. His mother is Vietnamese opera singer Luu Nga, while father Nguyen Bang Bui is a doctor. The family lived in a small loft on Ngo Si Lien Street in Hanoi. His father worked at a hospital and his mother sold pho when not performing. When Bằng Kiều revealed his talent for singing, his family invested all of their money for him to learn music.

During his mother's pregnancy, she used to dream of picking him up at Xa Kieu bridge, explaining his name. Early in his career, he said that he was "miserable [with his] not-so-modern name". Later, he admitted that his "name is pretty unique".

== Career ==
=== Debut: 1989–2000 ===
In 1989, he studied bassoon at Hanoi Conservatory, where he founded the band Golden Key. From 1990 to 1996, he was a member of Frangipani. In 1998, he established another band called Watermelon, which included Anh Tu, Tuan Hung and Tuong Van. Watermelon disbanded in 2000, and Kiều embarked upon his solo career.

=== National success ===
He found much success as a solo artist, and was invited to perform in national and local shows. He performed alongside songwriters and singers including Duyen Dang Viet Nam, Green Wave and Nhip Cau Am Nhac in Dong Thoi Gian 2002.

In May 2001, he appeared in a play by Ho Chi Minh City's Television Broadcast Station. His acting received positive reviews though the show itself found little success. He was named as "multi-talented boy" by Tuoi Tre Newspaper. In September that year, he participated in a football match against a team of Hong Kong actors in a charity match for the Vietnam Deaf People Foundation.

=== Touring: 2001–2003 ===
In 2001, the movement of bringing singers to perform abroad by Ho Chi Minh City's Performance Organization Company gained success. Kieu and artist crew had a 1-month tour at the request of the Vietnamese community in Eastern Europe. Previously, he had performed in America as well as learning studio techniques. He performed in Australia in 2002.

After the release of album Chuyen La, he toured in America and Vietnam and recorded his second album. He assisted Trinh in business and preparing for their wedding. Beside singing, he was acting and working with Trinh, including a musical tea room and coffee shop in Ho Chi Minh City.

In September 2002, they married and relocated to America. For a period of time, there were some Vietnamese-Americans protested that Kieu was assigned to spread the "culture movement" of Vietnamese communism in America. During a show in 2003, he shared that he would like to be a part of the Vietnamese-American community. He was welcomed in many places in America and Canada. He performed in Australia, Philippines, Netherlands, Germany and Czech Republic.

=== Incident: 2003–2004 ===
In middle of November 2003, he visited his family in Hanoi. In 25 November, website Tin Tuc Vietnam Thoi Doi Moi run by the Bureau of Culture and Information posted an interview titled Kieu Bang Kieu. The interview stirred confusion and disagreement among artists, the overseas community and Vietnam, including his statement that he was the highest paid Vietnamese artist in America, that he belonged to the generation of "enthusiastically dispelling Vietnamese-American music off Vietnam", that he deliberately avoided music shows abroad, as well as verdicts about the taste and working ethic of music shows in Vietnam. On 27 December 2003, in a meeting, the leader of the Vietnamese community in Sacramento issued an official statement attacking him for having "internal activities assigned from Vietnam Communism in order to corrupt Vietnamese refugees oversea". Facing the incident, he clarified that "the interview was twisted for bad purposes", that he did have an interview with the journalist but it was regarding common stories, unlike the statement in the interview.

After returning to America, he made some controversial statements as clarification for the incident, as: "In most recent visit, I had denied many big music shows to prove my will toward the land of freedom...Hopefully everyone will be pleased to accept me as a new member of the community". This statement was claimed to be a betrayal by Cong An Nhan Dan. Afterwards, during a show, a manager named Viet Dzung appointed someone to insert the flag of the Republic of Vietnam in the bouquet so that when Kieu waved the bouquet, he would be waving that flag. This image was recorded and exaggerated for political purposes. Accordingly, all of the songs performed by Kieu at Paris By Night shows were planned by Viet Dzung for "political purposes".

In February 2004, the Bureau of Art – Performance temporarily postponed his shows. On 22 November, they made a statement to related agencies and individuals not to use any song and performance of Bang Kieu. Following the statement, his citizenship was officially annulled.

=== 2004–present ===
He collaborates with Thúy Nga Productions. He often appears in Paris By Night including 80, 85, 86, 88, 91, 96, 98, 99, and 100, singing and acting.

At the end of February 2008, after 4-year living in America, he and family visited Vietnam. He shared that he was "so happy" but did not perform or give interviews, saying, "[I[ don't know what to say right now". During this visit, he attended music shows in the audience. Touched by the enthusiasm of the audience, he stated, "hopefully I could perform for Vietnamese audience in Vietnam".

Despite this, that same year, Thúy Nga paired him Minh Tuyết as a duet pair and partner. This immediately paid off when they released their first duet album, Bởi Vì Anh Yêu Em for Paris by Night 93, catching everyone's attention. At the time, Thúy Nga Productions did not have any idea that they would sing together at all. After that, they appeared and paired in many Paris by Night shows, concerts, and CD/albums together, and many fans praised them as the "perfect duo".

In March 2010, he again visited Vietnam for the birthday party of singer Hong Nhung. Afterward, during a visit to Phnom Penh in December 2011, he and his family visited Vietnam. He held a fan meeting at Club Passion in Hanoi that was so crowded that the police canceled the event after 15 minutes. On 25 September 2012, he and singer Khánh Ly were authorized to perform in Vietnam by Bureau of Art Performance, which lasted until December same year. His first live show in Vietnam came the following month, involving him and his duet partner Minh Tuyết.

In 2024, Bằng Kiều confirmed his participation in the reality television program Call Me by Fire alongside 32 other male artists.

== Personal life ==
He had a 6-year relationship with singer My Linh. He later dated Tang Hue Van. He encouraged her music career. Later he met American-Vietnamese Trizzie Phuong Trinh in Duyen Dang Vietnam in April 2000. He claimed he abandoned smoking, admitting that it damaged his voice. However, according to Trizzie, he kept smoking. In September 2002, they married. The wedding was held in America and Hanoi before relocating to Southern California. Their first son was named Beckham Bang Phuong. By 2012, he had three sons.

He shared that he would never have a duet with Trizzie due to the differences in style and vocal ability. In May 2013, it was rumored that they divorced. Until 2014, it was rumored that he was in a relationship with Miss Vietnam, Duong My Linh.

== Style ==
In 2002, he shared that his music style was influenced by songwriter Duong Thu. His songs were mostly romantic, not sad and sorrowful. He used to say that his singing was his priority, however he changed his mind and paid more attention to performance costume "to show respect to the audiences".

== Albums ==
He released 15 albums, one a year 2002–2014.

- Chuyện Lạ (2002)
- Anh Sẽ Nhớ Mãi (2003)
- Mắt Biếc (2004)
- Vá Lại Tình Tôi (2005)
- Bởi Vì Anh Yêu Em – Bằng Kiều & Minh Tuyết (2006)
- Hoài Cảm (2007)
- Linh Hồn Đã Mất (2007)
- The best of Bằng Kiều – Linh Hồn Đã Mất (2008)
- Nhạc Yêu Cầu (2009)
- Một Lần Nữa Xin Có Nhau – Bằng Kiều & Minh Tuyết (2010)
- Những tình khúc chọn lọc – Xin Đừng Quay Lại (2010)
- Lại Gần Hôn Anh (2011)
- Bằng Kiếu – Vũ Thành An (2011)
- Lâu Đài Tình Ái – Bằng Kiều & Minh Tuyết (2014)
- Đời Đá Vàng – Bằng Kiều, Thiên Tôn & Đình Bảo (2014)
