= Khánh Vy =

Vietnamese vlogger (born 1999)

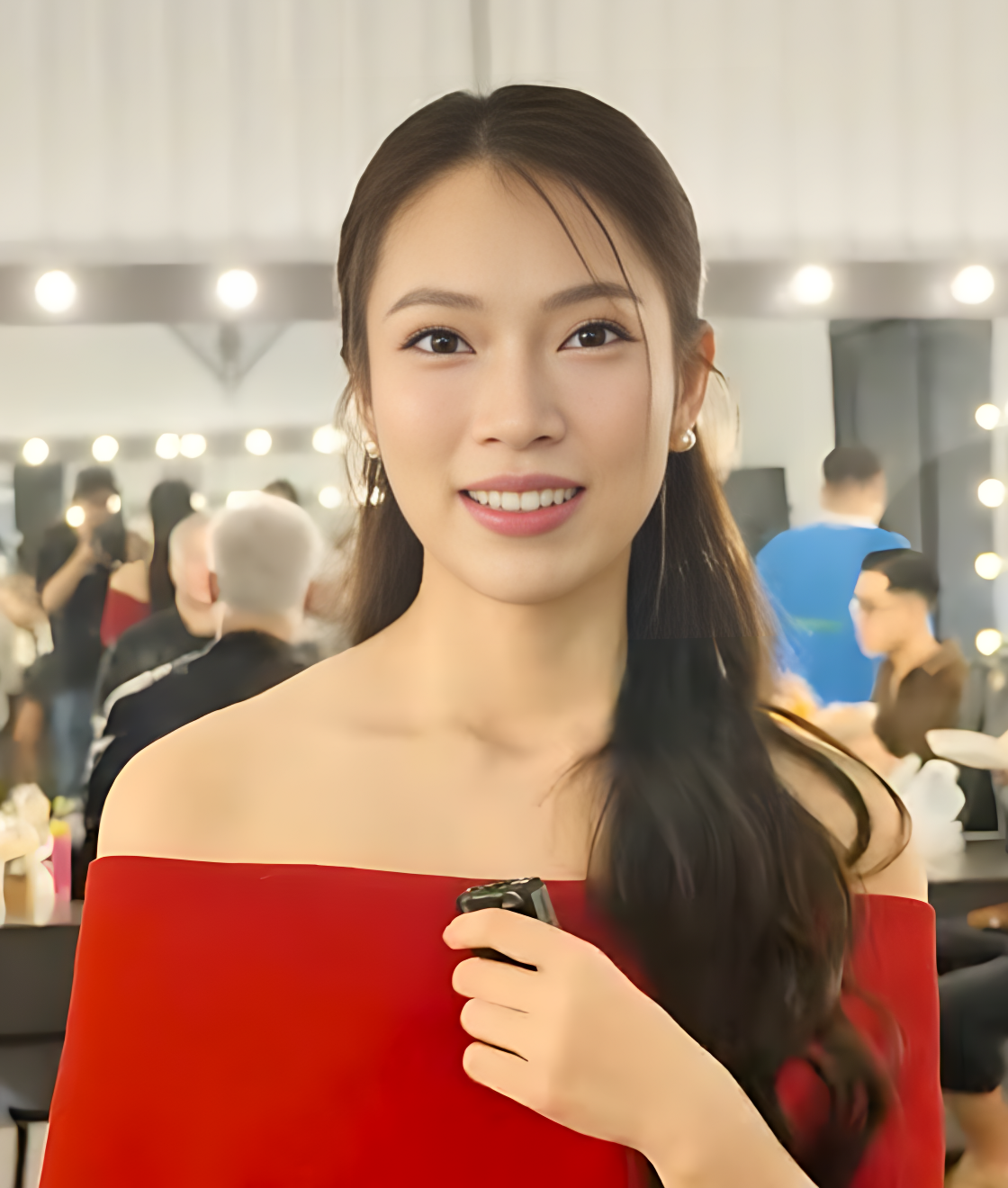
- Khánh Vy in 2022
- Born: Trần Khánh Vy; 21 August 1999 (age 26); Trung Thành, Nghệ An, Vietnam
- Education: Diplomatic Academy of Vietnam

Comedy career
- Years active: 2012–present
- Genres: Lifestyle; Tourism

Trần Khánh Vy (born 21 August 1999), commonly known by her stage name Khánh Vy, is a Vietnamese vlogger, YouTuber and master of ceremonies, she is the youngest host ever of the challenge show Road to Olympia.

== Early life ==
Khánh Vy was born on 21 August 1999 in Trung Thành, Yên Thành, Nghệ An province with the birth name Trần Khánh Vy, then she moved to live in Vinh. Her grandfather died in the Vietnam War. According to Khánh Vy, because she was able to imitate languages from a young age, her family sent her to English classes in the third grade and supported her in learning other languages.

In 2014, Khánh Vy passed the entrance exam to Phan Bội Châu English High School with a total score of 14th in the whole grade. In 2016, she became famous for her videos speaking seven different languages including Thai, Chinese, Korean, Italian, English, Japanese, Saigon accent and Hanoi accent. Also in this year, she scored 28.03 points in the national entrance exam. With this score, Vy is qualified to study at Foreign Trade University, Diplomatic Academy, Academy of Journalism and Communication and FPT University; she also received a full scholarship worth 170 million VND from FPT University. However, she chose International Relations at the Diplomatic Academy.

== Career ==
At the end of 2016, Khánh Vy was recruited as a presenter for the news program "The Tilted World" of VTC Digital Television. After appearing as a guest on the program 8 IELTS – an English Talk show of VTV7, Vietnam Television, Vy became the host for this talk show. In addition to 8 IELTS, she also appeared on another news program of Vietnam Television.

In 2018, she became one of the representatives of Vietnamese youth to attend the 13th Mekong Subregion Journey presentation in China and Thailand. She then collaborated with Osad in the music video "Người âm phủ". In 2019, Khánh Vy received a 200 million VND scholarship to study abroad for 2 weeks in New York City, United States. Also in this year, she was chosen as one of four Asian representatives to participate in the Ambassador Tour in Washington, D.C.. In August 2020, Khánh Vy graduated from the International Relations major of the Diplomatic Academy of Vietnam with a first-class degree.

Since the end of September 2021, Khánh Vy has become the new host of the program Road to Olympia, after her predecessor Diệp Chi.

At the end of January 2022, Khánh Vy, along with Trấn Thành, Thúy Ngân, and Kaity Nguyễn took on the role of hosting the New Year's Eve entertainment program Sóng 22. She then took on the role of host of the programs "Sinh Viên Thế Hệ Mới" and "Có Hẹn Cùng Thanh Xuân" on VTV3 in 2023. In April 2024, she was chosen as one of the two main hosts for the show "Anh trai vuợt ngàn chông gai" with Anh Tuấn. In March 2025, she was chosen as the main MC for the fan meeting of Blackpink member Jisoo in Hanoi.

Besides being a host, Khánh Vy also has her own YouTube channel, with the content she makes mostly sharing her experiences learning English and giving pronunciation instructions. In 2018, Vy's channel reached 100,000 followers. In 2020, Vy's YouTube channel reached 1 million subscribers, helping her win the YouTube Gold Play Button.

== Television show ==
| Year | TV show | Channel | Role |
|---|---|---|---|
| 2016 | Thế giới nghiêng | VTC1 | Host |
| 2017 | 8 IELTS | VTV7 | Host |
| 2017 | Follow us | VTV7 | Host |
| 2019 | Nhanh như chớp | HTV7 | Player |
| 2021 | Vua tiếng Việt | VTV3 | Player |
| 2021–present | Đường lên đỉnh Olympia | VTV3 | Host |
| 2022 | Sóng 22 | HTV2–Vie Channel | Host |
| 2022 | Ký ức vui vẻ | VTV3 | Guess |
| 2023 | Sinh viên thế hệ mới | VTV3 | Host |
| 2023 | Có hẹn cùng thanh xuân | VTV3 | Host |
| 2024 | 12 con giáp | VTV3 | Guess |
| 2024 | Quán quen chính gốc | VTV3 | Guess |
| 2024 | Điều nhỏ bé kỳ diệu | VTV3 | Guess |
| 2024 | Anh trai vượt ngàn chông gai | VTV3 | Host |
| 2025 | Đẹp +84 | VTV3 | Host (as train captain) |
| 2025 | Mùa hè lấp lánh | VTV3 | Actress (as nốt Đồ) |

== Other roles ==
=== Music video ===
| Year | Song | Artist | Role | References |
|---|---|---|---|---|
| 2018 | Người âm phủ | OSAD | Actress, English duet | |

== Awards and nominations ==
| Year | Ceremony | Category | Nominee | Result | Note |
|---|---|---|---|---|---|
| 2016 | Ấn tượng VTV | Character of the Year | Herself | Nominated | |
| 2020 | Ấn tượng VTV | Impressive Editor – Host | Herself | Nominated | |
| 2024 | Vietnam iContent Awards | Inspirational Content Creator of the Year | Herself | Won | |

== Published books ==
Khánh Vy and Nguyễn Thiện Khiêm co-wrote the book Tiếng Anh không khó, đừng nhăn nhó, published on 5 July 2020.
