= Trong Hieu =

German singer and dancer (born 1992)

Trong Hieu Trọng Hiếu
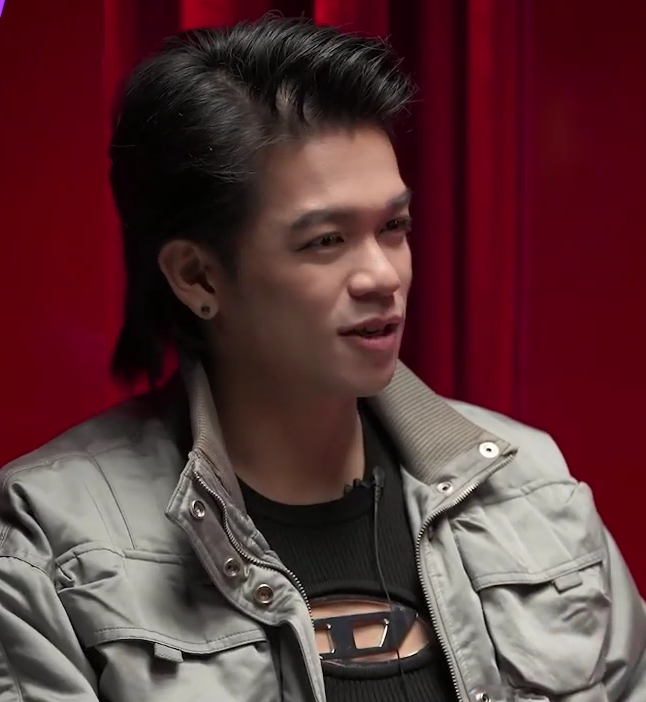
- Trọng Hiếu in 2024

Background information
- Born: Trong Hieu Nguyen; 4 July 1992 (age 34); Bad Kissingen, Bavaria, Germany
- Genres: Pop; R&B; V-pop
- Occupations: Singer; dancer
- Years active: 2014–present

Trong Hieu Nguyen (Vietnamese: Nguyễn Trọng Hiếu; born 4 July 1992), known professionally as Trọng Hiếu or (S)Trong (stylised in all caps), is a German singer of Vietnamese descent, best known for winning the sixth season of Vietnam Idol in 2015.

== Early life and education ==
Trong Hieu Nguyen was born on 4 July 1992 in Bad Kissingen, Bavaria to Vietnamese parents who emigrated to Germany in 1991. He started dancing at the age of eight. After graduating from the Jack-Steinberger-Gymnasium in Bad Kissingen in 2011, he studied singing at the Music College Hannover in Hannover. He has cited Bruno Mars as one of his main artistic influences.

== Career ==
In 2008, Nguyen was a participant in the fifth season of Deutschland sucht den Superstar, the German version of the Idol franchise. He made it to the top twenty-five, but was eliminated before the live shows. In 2014, he applied for Unser Song für Österreich, the German national selection for the Eurovision Song Contest 2015, but was not among the artists selected to compete.

While on vacation in Vietnam in April 2015, Nguyen decided to audition for the sixth season of Vietnam Idol. He went on to win the competition, receiving 71.5 per cent of the public vote in the final. He subsequently released the winner's single "Con đường tôi", which was also released in German as "Wie ich bin".

In 2020, Nguyen represented Vietnam at the Asia Song Festival. On 27 January 2023, he was announced as one of the participants in Unser Lied für Liverpool, the German national selection for the Eurovision Song Contest 2023. His entry "Dare to Be Different" was co-written with Norwegian singer-songwriter Elsie Bay and Dutch songwriters Sasha Rangas and Stefan van Leijsen. At Unser Lied für Liverpool, the song finished fourth out of eight entries with 71 points.

By 2024, Nguyen re-established his career in Vietnam, first participating in Anh trai vượt ngàn chông gai's first season and made it into the "All-Round Family" lineup. After the competition, he and Cường Seven formed the music group Sx7. The group chose the final of Chị đẹp đạp gió as their first performance stage with a mashup of "20 phút" and "Chất chơi". He scored his first Vietnamese hit with "Kho báu" in 2025.

== Discography ==
=== Extended plays ===
- 2021 – Trong Hieu Live in Berlin
- 2022 – Thú vị hơn vậy
- 2023 – Yêu chill
- 2025 – Kho báu

=== Singles ===
==== As lead artist ====
- 2014 – "Peter Pan"
- 2015 – "Con đường tôi"
- 2015 – "Wie ich bin"
- 2015 – "Em là bà nội của anh"
- 2016 – "Bước đến bên em (Step to You)"
- 2016 – "Komm wir gehen (One Step Closer)"
- 2016 – "Say Ah"
- 2016 – "Ahhh!"
- 2017 – "Chỉ có tình yêu ở lại"
- 2017 – "Peter Pan" (Vietnamese version)
- 2017 – "Tình ca"
- 2017 – "Perfect"
- 2018 – "Sút"
- 2018 – "Vì anh là vậy"
- 2018 – "Vẽ thế giới"
- 2018 – "You Are the Reason"
- 2018 – "Girls Like You"
- 2018 – "Green Groove (Cứ thế bay)"
- 2019 – "Hurt Me"
- 2019 – "Yêu là… (Invisible)"
- 2019 – "Anh đổ rồi đấy"
- 2020 – "Ăn đi cho sướng"
- 2020 – "Vì chúng ta yêu"
- 2020 – "See What I See"
- 2020 – "Yêu trong im lặng"
- 2020 – "20 phút"
- 2020 – "Đập vỡ tim anh cho rồi"
- 2020 – "Người bay"
- 2020 – "365 Missing"
- 2021 – "1 lần"
- 2021 – "Ông trời để lạc em ở đây"
- 2021 – "Anh vẫn thấy"
- 2021 – "Highs & Lows" (with Moodygee and Octa)
- 2022 – "Thú vị hơn vậy"
- 2022 – "I'm Sorry Babe" (featuring Mai Âm Nhạc)
- 2022 – "Mưa phi trường" (with Ali Hoàng Dương and JSOL)
- 2023 – "Dare to Be Different"
- 2024 – "Rise Up"
- 2025 – "Kho báu"

==== As featured artist ====
- 2020 – "IAM Superstar" (Trang Phap featuring Trọng Hiếu, Gil Lê and Chung Thanh Phong)
- 2022 – "Am I Clear?!" (Tóc Tiên featuring Trọng Hiếu and Mew Amazing)

== Awards and nominations ==
Award	Year	Category	Result
VTV Awards	2018	Outstanding Singer	Nominated
