= Microwave (Vietnamese band) =

Vietnamese rock band

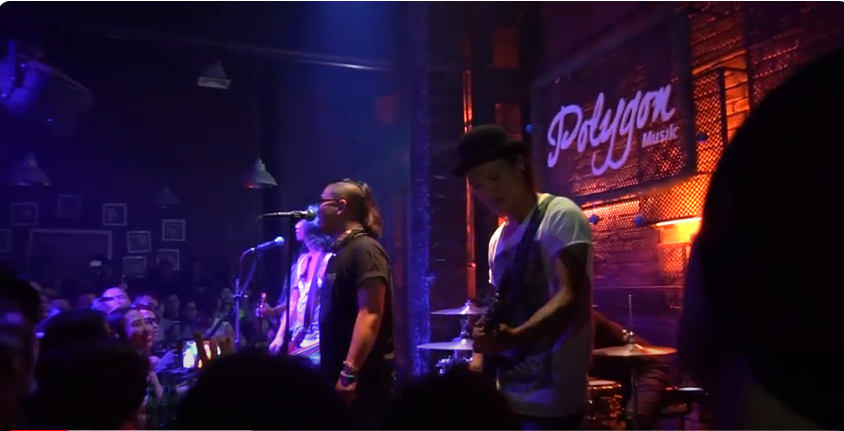
- Microwave performed at Polygon Musik in 2017

Background information
- Origin: Ho Chi Minh City, Vietnam
- Genres: Alternative rock; nu metal
- Years active: 2001–present
- Members: Cao Minh Trung; Đinh Tuấn Khanh; Phan Anh Tuấn; Trần Ngọc Tùng
- Past members: Lâm Quang Thuấn; Nguyễn Công Hải; Nguyễn Đức Huy; Tôn Thất Long; Trác Ngọc Lĩnh

Microwave (MW) are a Vietnamese rock band, formed in 2001 in Vietnam's National University of Civil Engineering. The band released their first studio album, Lối thoát, in 2005 in Vietnam. The band is considered to be the leader of Ho Chi Minh City's rock scene.

== Members ==
=== Current ===
- Đinh Tuấn Khanh. – lead singer (2001–2003, 2005–present)
- Trần Ngọc Tùng – guitar (2002–present)
- Phan Anh Tuấn – bass (2003–present)
- Cao Minh Trung – drum (2001–present)

=== Past ===
- Nguyễn Công Hải – singer (2001–2005)
- Lâm Quang Thuấn – keyboard (2002–2003)
- Nguyễn Đức Huy – bass (2002–2003)
- Tôn Thất Long –
- Trác Ngọc Lĩnh – guitar (2001–2011)

== Discography ==
Studio albums

- Lối thoát (2005)
- Thời gian (2009)
- 10 (2015)
