= List of Paris by Night episodes =

This is the list of the episodes of Paris by Night, a Vietnamese-language musical variety show. Due to the way releases are made available on VHS, DVD, and Blu-ray, many release dates cannot be determined precisely.

== List of Paris by Night shows ==
Series	Title	English translation	Film date	Video release date
1	Paris by Night			1983
2	Paris by Night 2			1986
3	Paris by Night 3			1986
4	Paris by Night 4			1987
5	Paris by Night 5			1987
6	Paris by Night 6: Paris by Night 5th Anniversary			1988
7	Paris by Night 7			1989
8	Paris by Night 8			1989
9	Paris by Night 9			1989
10	Paris by Night 10			1990
11	Paris by Night 11			1990
12	Paris by Night 12			1991
13	Paris by Night Đặc Biệt	Paris by Night Special		1991
14	Paris by Night 14			1991
15	Paris by Night 15			1992
16	Paris by Night 16			1992
17	Paris by Night 17			1992
18	Paris by Night 18: Merry Christmas			1992
19	Paris by Night 19: Tình Ca Phạm Duy - Tác Phẩm và Con Người	Phạm Duy's Love Songs - Creation and Humanity		1993
20	Paris by Night 20: Tuyệt Phẩm	Masterpiece		1993
21	Paris by Night 21: Tình Ca Ngô Thụy Miên	Ngô Thụy Miên’s Love Songs		1993
22	Paris by Night 22: 40 Năm Âm Nhạc Lam Phương	40 Years of Lam Phuong Music		1993
23	Paris by Night 23: Thế Giới Muôn Màu	Colorful World		1993
24	Paris by Night 24: Paris by Night 10th Anniversary			1993
25	Paris by Night 25			1994
26	Paris by Night 26: Đêm Hoa Đăng - Sacrée Soirée 1	The Night of Flower Lantern - Sacrée Soirée 1		1994
27	Paris by Night 27: Tiếng Hát Với Cung Đàn Văn Phụng - Sacrée Soirée 2	Singing with Văn Phụng's Melodies - Sacrée Soirée 2		1994
28	Paris by Night 28: Lam Phương 2 - Dòng Nhạc Tiếp Nối - Sacrée Soirée 3	Lam Phương 2 - The Continuation of Music - Sacrée Soirée 3		1994
29	Paris by Night 29: In Las Vegas			1994
30	Paris by Night 30: Phạm Duy 2 - Người Tình	Phạm Duy 2 - Lover		1995
31	Paris by Night 31			1995
32	Paris by Night 32: 20 Năm Nhìn Lại	Looking Back at 20 Years		1995
33	Paris by Night 33: Nhạc Tình Đức Huy	Duc Huy's Love Music		1995
34	Paris by Night 34: Made in Paris			1995
35	Paris by Night 35			1996
36	Paris by Night 36: In Houston			1996
37	Paris by Night 37: In Las Vegas 2			1996
38	Paris by Night 38: In Toronto			1996
39	Paris by Night 39: Ánh Đèn Màu	Colorful Light		1997
40	Paris by Night 40: Mẹ	Mother		1997
41	Paris by Night 41: Hoàng Thi Thơ - Một Đời Cho Âm Nhạc	Hoàng Thi Thơ - A Life For Music		1997
42	Paris by Night 42: Dòng Nhạc Kỷ Niệm	Music of Memories		1997
43	Paris by Night 43: Đàn Bà	Women		1998
44	Paris by Night 44: Tiền	Money		1998
45	Paris by Night 45: Vào Hạ	Summer		1998
46	Paris by Night 46: 15th Anniversary Celebration			1998
47	Paris by Night 47: Hoàng Thi Thơ 2			1999
48	Paris by Night 48: Hình Ảnh Cuộc Đời	Picture of Life		1999
49	Paris by Night 49: Chúng Ta Đi Mang Theo Quê Hương	We Carry Our Homeland		1999
50	Paris by Night 50			1999
51	Paris by Night 51: We Like To Party			1999
52	Paris by Night 52: Giã Từ Thế Kỷ	Farewell to the Century		1999
53	Paris by Night 53: Thiên Đuờng Là Đây	This is Paradise		2000
54	Paris by Night 54: In Concert			2000
55	Paris by Night 55: Duới Ánh Nắng Mặt Trời	Under the Sun Light		2000
56	Paris by Night 56: Những Dòng Nhạc Hôm Nay	Music of Today		2000
57	Paris by Night 57: Thời Trang và Âm Nhạc	Fashion and Music		2000
58	Paris by Night 58: Những Sắc Màu Trong Kỷ Niệm	Colors in Memories		2001
59	Paris by Night 59: Cây Đa Bến Cũ	The Old Wharf Banyan Tree		2001
60	Paris by Night 60: Thất Tình	Lovesick		2001
61	Paris by Night 61: Sân Khấu Cuộc Đời	Stage of Life		2001
62	Paris by Night 62: Âm Nhạc Không Biên Giới	Borderless Music		2001
63	Paris by Night 63: Dòng Thời Gian	Timeline		2002
64	Paris by Night 64: Đêm Văn Nghệ Thính Phòng	Performance Night in the Auditorium		2002
65	Paris by Night 65: Yêu	Love		2002
66	Paris by Night 66: Nguời Tình và Quê Huong	Lovers and Homeland		2002
67	Paris by Night 67: In San Jose			2002
68	Paris by Night 68: Nửa Vầng Trăng	Half Moon		2003
69	Paris by Night 69: Nợ Tình	Debt of Love		2003
70	Paris by Night 70: Thu Ca	Autumn Music		2003
71	Paris By Night 71: Paris by Night 20th Anniversary			2003
72	Paris By Night 72: Tiếng Hát Từ Nhịp Tim	Voices from the Heartbeat		2004
73	Paris By Night 73: Song Ca Đặc Biệt	The Best of Duets		2004
74	Paris By Night 74: Hoa Bướm Ngày Xưa	Pansies of the Old Days		2004
75	Paris By Night 75: Về Miền Viễn Đông	Journey to the Far East		2004
76	Paris by Night 76: Xuân Tha Hương	Spring in Exile	October 30, 2004	2005
77	Paris by Night 77: 30 Năm Viễn Xứ	30 Years Away from the Homeland	March 5, 2005	April 28, 2005
78	Paris by Night 78: Đường Xưa	The Old Path	June 11, 2005	August 11, 2005
79	Paris by Night 79: Dreams		August 20, 2005	2005
80	Paris by Night 80: Tết Khắp Mọi Nhà	Tết Among Every House	October 29, 2005	January 16, 2006
81	Paris by Night 81: Âm Nhạc Không Biên Giới 2	Borderless Music 2	January 21, 2006	April 20, 2006
82	Paris by Night 82: Tiếu Vương Hội	Comedy Festival	March 25, 2006	June 22, 2006
83	Paris by Night 83: Những Khúc Hát Ân Tình	Lyrics of Love	May 27, 2006	September 21, 2006
84	Paris by Night 84: In Atlanta - Passport to Music & Fashion		July 2, 2006	December 7, 2006
85	Paris by Night 85: Xuân Trong Kỷ Niệm	Spring in Memories	October 21, 2006	January 25, 2007
86	Paris by Night 86: PBN Talent Show - Semi-Finals		February 8, 2007	April 12, 2007
87	Paris by Night 87: PBN Talent Show - Finals		February 10, 2007	April 26, 2007
88	Paris by Night 88: Lam Phương - Đường Về Quê Hương	Lam Phương - Path to the Homeland	May 5, 2007	July 5, 2007
89	Paris by Night 89: In Korea		July 1, 2007	August 30, 2007
90	Paris by Night 90: Chân Dung Người Phụ Nữ Việt Nam	The Portrait of a Vietnamese Woman	September 15–16, 2007	December 13, 2007
91	Paris by Night 91: Huế, Sài Gòn, Hà Nội	Huế, Saigon, Hanoi	January 12–13, 2008	March 27, 2008
92	Paris by Night 92: Nhạc Yêu Cầu	Most Requested Music	May 10–11, 2008	July 3, 2008
93	Paris by Night 93: Khiêu Vũ Của Các Ngôi Sao	Celebrity Dancing	May 14, 2008	August 29, 2008
94	Paris by Night 94: Paris by Night 25th Anniversary (Part I)		September 20, 2008	December 12, 2008
95	Paris by Night 95: Paris by Night 25th Anniversary (Part II) – Cám Ơn Cuộc Đời	Thank You, Life	September 21, 2008	January 22, 2009
96	Paris by Night 96: Nhạc Yêu Cầu 2	Most Requested Music 2	April 18–19, 2009	June 25, 2009
97	Paris by Night 97: Khiêu Vũ Của Các Ngôi Sao 2	Celebrity Dancing 2	April 22, 2009	September 22, 2009
98	Paris by Night 98: Fly With Us To Las Vegas		September 18-19, 2009	December 10, 2009
99	Paris by Night 99: Tôi Là Người Việt Nam	I Am Vietnamese	January 16–17, 2010	April 9, 2010
Special	Paris by Night Divas: Đêm hội ngộ của các nữ siêu sao	Divas Reunion Night	January 20, 2010	2010
100	Paris by Night 100: Ghi Nhớ Một Chặng Đường	To Remember a Journey	July 3–4, 2010	October 7, 2010
101	Paris by Night 101: Hạnh Phúc Đầu Năm	Happy New Year	November 13–14, 2010	January 14, 2011
102	Paris by Night 102: Nhạc Yêu Cầu - Tình Ca Lam Phương	Most Requested Music: Love Songs by Lam Phương	February 12–13, 2011	April 15, 2011
103	Paris by Night 103: Tình Sử Trong Âm Nhạc Việt Nam	Love Stories in Music of Vietnam	May 7–8, 2011	July 14, 2011
104	Paris by Night 104: Beginnings		September 3–4, 2011	December 16, 2011
VIP Party	Paris by Night 104 VIP Party			February 18, 2012
105	Paris by Night 105: Người Tình	The Lovers	March 17–18, 2012	June 14, 2012
106	Paris by Night 106: Lụa	Silk	September 1–2, 2012	December 19, 2012
VIP Party	Paris by Night 106 VIP Party			February 8, 2013
107	Paris by Night 107: Nguyễn Ngọc Ngạn - 20 Năm Sân Khấu	20 Years On Stage of Nguyễn Ngọc Ngạn	November 10–11, 2012	March 16, 2013
108	Paris by Night 108: Thời Gian	Time	March 23–24, 2013	May 31, 2013
109	Paris by Night 109: 30th Anniversary Celebration		July 6–7, 2013	November 21, 2013
Special	Paris by Night Gloria: Cao cung lên	Raise the Bow	December 13, 2013	December 24, 2013
VIP Party	Paris by Night 109 VIP Party		July 7, 2013	December 30, 2013
110	Paris by Night 110: Phát Lộc Đầu Năm	New Year's Fortune	November 16–17, 2013	January 24, 2014
111	Paris by Night 111: S		May 24–25, 2014	August 22, 2014
112	Paris by Night 112: Đông	Winter	September 27–28, 2014	December 19, 2014
Special	Paris by Night Gloria 2: Để Chúa đến	Gloria 2: Let the God Comes	November 21, 2014	December 22, 2014
113	Paris by Night 113: Mừng Tuổi Mẹ	Happy Mother Age	January 10–11, 2015	February 16, 2015
114	Paris by Night 114: 1975-2015: Tôi Là Người Việt Nam	1975-2015: We Are Vietnamese	April 4–5, 2015	June 12, 2015
115	Paris by Night 115: Nét đẹp Á Đông	Asian Beauty	July 4–5, 2015	October 9, 2015
116	Paris by Night 116: Nụ cười đầu năm	New Year's Smiles	November 15, 2015	December 22, 2015
117	Paris by Night 117: Vườn Hoa Âm Nhạc	Garden of Music	November 14–15, 2015	January 29, 2016
118	Paris by Night 118: 50 Năm Âm Nhạc Đức Huy	50 Years of Đức Huy's Music	May 7, 2016	June 30, 2016
119	Paris by Night 119: Nhạc Vàng Muôn Thuở	Eternal Yellow Music	May 8, 2016	September 3, 2016
120	Paris by Night 120: Còn chút gì để nhớ	What's Left to Remember?	October 8–9, 2016	December 21, 2016
121	Paris by Night 121: Song Ca Nhạc Vàng	Yellow Music Duets	December 3–4, 2016	January 26, 2017
122	Paris by Night 122: Duyên Phận	Fate	April 1–2, 2017	June 23, 2017
123	Paris by Night 123: Ảo Ảnh	Illusion	July 15–16, 2017	November 21, 2017
Special	Paris by Night Gloria 3: Hoan Ca Maria	Maria's Greeting Songs	December 1, 2017	December 21, 2017
Special	Paris by Night Divos		September 3, 2017	January 19, 2018
124	Paris by Night 124: Anh Cho Em Mùa Xuân	You Gave Me Spring	November 11–12, 2017	February 9, 2018
125	Paris by Night 125: Chiều Mưa Biên Giới	Afternoon Rain at the Border	April 29, 2018	July 26, 2018
126	Paris by Night 126: Hành Trình 35 Năm	35-Year Journey	May 26–27, 2018	October 12, 2018
127	Paris by Night 127: Hành Trình 35 Năm (Phần 2)	35-Year Journey (Part 2)	September 8–9, 2018	December 14, 2018
128	Paris by Night 128: Hành Trình 35 Năm (Phần 3) – Feel the Lights	35-Year Journey (Part 3) – Feel the Lights	December 15–16, 2018	March 1, 2019
129	Paris by Night 129: Dynasty		June 28–29, 2019	November 8, 2019
130	Paris by Night 130: In Singapore – Glamour		November 23–24, 2019	February 20, 2020
131	Paris by Night 131: Xuân Hy Vọng	Spring Hope	January 2021	February 12, 2021
132	Paris by Night 132: Xuân Với Đời Sống Mới	Spring With New Life	December 10–11, 2021	February 2, 2022
133	Paris By Night 133: Nguyễn Ngọc Ngạn - The Farewell		July 30-31, 2022	December 1, 2022
134	Paris By Night 134: In Bangkok - Nguyễn Ngọc Ngạn - Lời Cảm Ơn	Nguyễn Ngọc Ngạn - Thanks in Bangkok	October 15-16, 2022	May 4, 2023
135	Paris By Night 135: Từ Công Phụng Trên Ngọn Tình Sầu	Từ Công Phụng On the Top of Sorrowful Love	March 11-12, 2023	September 30, 2023
136	Paris By Night 136: Hành Trình 40 Năm	Paris by Night 40th Anniversary	July 29-30, 2023	January 20, 2024
137	Paris By Night 137: Hành Trình 40 Năm (Phần 2) - Tác Giả & Tác Phẩm	Paris by Night 40th Anniversary (Part 2): Authors & Work	December 9-10, 2023	May 5, 2024
138	Paris By Night 138: Hoài Linh 30 Năm Sân Khấu	Hoài Linh: 30 Year On Stage	November 23-24, 2024	January 18, 2025
