= Paris by Night 52 =

Paris by Night 52: Giã Từ Thế Kỷ
- Paris by Night episode
- VHS box cover
- Episode no.: Episode 52
- Directed by: Christian Oshea
- Masters of ceremonies: Nguyễn Ngọc Ngạn; Nguyễn Cao Kỳ Duyên
- Filmed at: Long Beach, California
- Filmed on: September 26, 1999
- Venue: Terrace Theater
- Executive producer: Marie Tô
- Format: 3-Tape VHS
- Release date: 1999

Paris by Night 52: Giã Từ Thế Kỷ is a Paris by Night program produced by Thúy Nga that was filmed at the Terrace Theater in Long Beach, California. The MCs were Nguyễn Ngọc Ngạn and Nguyễn Cao Kỳ Duyên. This show was released on VHS in 1999. On December 31, 2016, the show was uploaded in its entirety to the official Thúy Nga Productions YouTube channel.

== Track listing ==
Tape 1
No.	Title	Writer(s)	Artist(s)	Length
1.	"Back to the Past" (opening)
2.	"Khổ Vì Yêu Nàng"	Tùng Châu; Lê Hựu Hà	Nguyễn Hưng
3.	"Tiếng Hát Chim Ða Ða"	Võ Đồng Điền	Như Quỳnh
4.	"Tình Tôi Mới Lớn"	Trần Quảng Nam	Loan Châu
5.	"Chilly ChaChaCha"		Phương Vy and Tommy Ngô
6.	"Tâm Sự Ðời Tôi"	Thanh Hằng	Hoàng Lan
7.	"Thi Sĩ Dưới Vầng Trăng"	Nhật Ngân (Vietnamese lyrics)	Bảo Hân
8.	"Búp Bê Không Tình Yêu"		Trúc Lam and Trúc Linh
9.	"Tuyệt Tình Ca" (partial cải lương)		Thành Được and Phượng Liên

Tape 2
No.	Title	Writer(s)	Artist(s)	Length
1.	"Nếu Ðiều Ðó Xảy Ra"	Ngọc Châu	Thế Sơn
2.	"Không Còn Mùa Thu"	Việt Anh	Ý Lan
3.	"Dù Anh Nghèo"	Tô Thanh Tùng	Phi Nhung and Mạnh Quỳnh
4.	"Hát Cho Người Xa Nhà"	Phạm Duy (Vietnamese lyrics)	Lưu Bích
5.	"Em Là Tất Cả" and "Phút Cuối" (medley)	Lam Phương	Phi Khanh and Anh Dũng
6.	"Vỗ Cái Trống Cơm"	Nguyễn Nghị	Ái Vân
7.	"Gia Tài Người Hàng Xóm" (comedy skit)	Thúy Nga drama group	Quang Minh, Hồng Đào, Trang Thanh Lan, and Kiều Linh

Tape 3
No.	Title	Writer(s)	Artist(s)	Length
1.	"Tiếng Dân Chài"	Phạm Đinh Chương	Nguyễn Hưng, Thế Sơn, Như Quỳnh, Hoàng Lan, and Phi Nhung
2.	"Tiếc Thương"	Quốc Hưng	Lây Minh and Diễm Liên
3.	"Phố Vắng Em Rồi"	Mạnh Phát	Thanh Tuyền
4.	"Tình Là Gì?"	Tùng Châu; Lê Hựu Hà	Thiên Kim
5.	"Only You"	Nhật Ngân (Vietnamese lyrics)	Don Hồ
6.	"Trai Thời Nay"	Lê Xuân Trường (Vietnamese lyrics)	Lynda Trang Đài, Bảo Hân, Phương Vy, Loan Châu, Trúc Lam, and Trúc Linh
7.	"Lời Mẹ Ru"	Trịnh Công Sơn	Khánh Ly
8.	"Ai Về Với Tôi"	Trần Ðức	Trần Ðức
9.	"Năm 2000"	Song Ngọc	Tommy Ngô and Lynda Trang Ðài

Notes

- Rights to the songs "Khổ Vì Yêu Nàng", "Tình Tôi Mới Lớn", "Tiếc Thương", "Tình Là Gì?", "Ai Về Với Tôi", and "Năm 2000" belonged to Thúy Nga Productions from the time of release.

Preceded by Paris by Night 51: Special Edition	Paris by Night; Paris by Night 52: Giã Từ Thế Kỷ	Succeeded by Paris by Night 53: Thiên Đuờng Là Đây
