= Paris by Night 84 =

In Atlanta - Passport to Music & Fashion
- Paris by Night episode
- Poster for PBN 84
- Episode no.: Episode 84
- Directed by: Michael Watt
- Masters of ceremonies: Nguyễn Ngọc Ngạn; Nguyễn Cao Kỳ Duyên; Kieu Oanh (selected)
- Filmed at: Atlanta, Georgia
- Filmed on: July 2, 2006
- Venue: Atlanta Civic Center
- Executive producers: Marie To; Paul Huynh
- Format: 2-Disc DVD
- Release date: December 7, 2006

Paris By Night 84: In Atlanta - Passport to Music & Fashion (Vietnamese: Âm Nhạc và Thời Trang) is a Paris By Night program that was filmed at the Atlanta Civic Center on Sunday, July 2, 2006 and is released to a 2-disc DVD format on Thursday, December 7, 2006; with many places getting it on Wednesday, December 6, 2006. This program is dedicated to Vietnamese designers and fashion artists. It includes several fashion shows and runway presentations by selected designers, such as Chloe Dao, winner of the Project Runway show. It also includes small-parted skits made by the MCs of the show, Nguyễn Ngọc Ngạn and Nguyễn Cao Kỳ Duyên, and regular comedian actress, Kieu Oanh. It is billed by Thúy Nga as The Most Magnificent and Extravagant Show of the Year.

The program was directed by Michael Watt.

Some have debated to whether Paris By Night 84 is a direct continuation of Paris By Night 57: Thời Trang và Âm Nhạc, released at the end of 2000, and is also dedicated to the fashion arts and music. The poke is that "Âm Nhạc" (Music) and "Thời Trang" (Fashion) has been switched around in the two titles. In earlier production, Paris By Night 84 was codenamed, "In Atlanta", before the title was announced as Âm Nhạc và Thời Tran. Some codenamed it, Thời Trang và Âm Nhạc 2, as a direct continuation of Paris By Night 57: Thời Trang và Âm Nhạc. However, once the filming has begun, viewers now know it as In Atlanta - Passport to Music & Fashion (Vietnamese: Âm Nhạc và Thời Trang). Even though the two Paris By Night's are the same in dedication and program, the two titles remained different in choosing of switching around the titles, and adding an English alternative to the Paris By Night 84 title. Paris By Night 84 is now viewed as an indirect successor to Paris By Night 57: Thời Trang và Âm Nhạc.

== Track list ==
Disc 1
No.	Title	Artist(s)	Length
1.	"Sẽ Không Quên Người"	Bảo Hân, Như Loan
2.	"Ngàn Thu Áo Tím"	Ngọc Liên, Loan Châu
3.	"Một Đời Tan Vỡ"	Thế Sơn, Thanh Trúc
4.	"Phỏng Vấn Thế Sơn"	Thanh Trúc
5.	"Áo Hoa"	Như Quỳnh, Quang Lê
6.	"Giấc Mộng M.C."	Kiều Oanh, Kỳ Duyên
7.	"Girls"	Huỳnh Gia Tuấn
8.	"Giấc Mộng M.C. Phần 2"	Kiều Oanh, Kỳ Duyên, Nguyễn Ngọc Ngạn
9.	"Về Đâu Mái Tóc Người Thương"	Hoàng Oanh, Phương Dung
10.	"Phỏng Vấn Hoàng Oanh"	Phương Dung
11.	"Tân Cổ: Hai Sắc Hoa, Một Nỗi Niềm"	Hương Lan, Xuân Mai
12.	"Clip: Uyên Uyên Tống (Jewelry Designer)"
13.	"Sao Em Nở Vội Lấy Chồng"	8 Ca Sĩ Trình Diễn Thời Trang Áo Dài Tường Khuê
14.	"Phỏng Vấn Như Quỳnh"	Như Quỳnh, Tường Khuê
15.	"Nghìn Trùng Xa Cách"	Khánh Hà, Ý Lan
16.	"Clip: Michelle Ngô (Fashion Designer)"
17.	"Niệm Khúc Cuối"	Trần Thái Hòa, Thanh Hà
18.	"Khẩu Xà Tâm Phật"	Kiều Oanh, Kỳ Duyên
19.	"Nhớ Anh Đêm Nay"	Hồ Lệ Thu, Nguyễn Hưng
20.	"Clip: Chloe Dao (Fashion Designer & Winner of Project Runway)"
21.	"Fashion Designer"	Chloe Đào
22.	"Phỏng Vấn"	Chloe Đào
23.	"Giọt Lệ Thiên Thu"	Khánh Ly, Trần Thu Hà
24.	"Clip: Kim Võ (Celebrity Hair Stylist)"

Disc 2
No.	Title	Artist(s)	Length
1.	"Liên Khúc: Đồng Xanh & Ôi! Giàn Thiên Lý Đã Xa"	Bằng Kiều, Tuấn Ngọc
2.	"Xin Cho Anh Yêu"	Trúc Lam, Trúc Linh
3.	"Phỏng Vấn"	Trúc Linh, Trúc Lam
4.	"Hài Kịch: Idols"	Hoài Linh, Chí Tài, Kiều Oanh, Lê Tín
5.	"Waiting For Your Call"	Tú Quyên, Shayla
6.	"Phỏng Vấn"	Thái Nguyễn, Tú Quyên, Shayla
7.	"Làm Sao Biết Được?"	Mạnh Quỳnh
8.	"Phố Đêm"	Như Quỳnh, Trường Vũ
9.	"Tình Dù Trăm Lối"	Lương Tùng Quang, Minh Tuyết
10.	"Clip: Roni Trọng (Finland Idol Finalist)"
11.	"Call Me"	Roni Trọng
12.	"Phỏng Vấn"	Roni Trọng
13.	"Em Đi Trên Cỏ Non"	Hà Phương, Hương Thủy
14.	"Phỏng Vấn"	Hương Thủy, Hà Phương
15.	"Lại Gần Hôn Em"	Dương Triệu Vũ, Ngọc Liên
16.	"Magic in the Air"	Thủy Tiên, Lưu Bích
17.	"Clip: Chân Lưu (Fashion Designer)"
18.	"Phỏng Vấn Chân Lưu"	Chân Lưu
19.	"I Will Survive"	Angela Trâm Anh, Vân Quỳnh
20.	"Phỏng Vấn Calvin Hiệp"	Calvin Hiệp
21.	"Những Bước Chân Âm Thầm"	10 Ca Sĩ Trình Diễn Thời Trang Calvin Hiệp
22.	"Finale Bonus Gục Ngã Vì Yêu"	Tâm Đoan
23.	"Hậu Trường Sân Khấu"

Preceded by Paris By Night 83: Những Khúc Hát Ân Tình	Paris By Night; Paris By Night 84: In Atlanta - Passport to Music & Fashion	Succeeded by Paris by Night 85: Xuân Trong Kỷ Niệm
