= Paris by Night 38 =

Paris By Night 38
- Paris by Night episode
- PBN 38 Box Cover
- Episode no.: Episode 38
- Directed by: Michael Watt
- Masters of ceremonies: Nguyễn Ngọc Ngạn; Nguyễn Cao Kỳ Duyên
- Filmed at: Toronto, Canada
- Filmed on: 1996
- Venue: CBC Toronto Studios - Studio 40
- Executive producer: Marie Tô
- Format: 2-Tape VHS
- Release date: 1996

Paris By Night 38: In Toronto is a Paris By Night program produced by Thúy Nga that was filmed at the Canadian Broadcasting Centre Studio #40 in Toronto, Canada. The MC's were Nguyễn Ngọc Ngạn and Nguyễn Cao Kỳ Duyên. This show was released on VHS in 1996. This was the first Paris By Night production to be filmed outside France and the United States.

== Track listing ==
Tape 1
No.	Title	Writer(s)	Artist(s)	Length
1.	"Khi màn đêm xuống"	Chí Tài (Vietnamese lyrics)	Phi Phi and Châu Ngọc
2.	"Hoa tím ngày xưa"	Thanh Sơn	Như Quỳnh
3.	"Mộng dưới hoa"	Đinh Hùng (verses); Phạm Đình Chương (music)	Ái Vân and Thái Châu
4.	"Jailhouse rock"		Tommy Ngô
5.	"Tình khúc mùa đông"	Thanh Trang	Họa Mi
6.	"Vĩnh biệt người tình"	Phạm Duy (Vietnamese lyrics)	Thanh Hà
7.	"Trở về cát bụi"		Thế Sơn
8.	"Nấu bánh đêm xuân"	Quy Sắc	Hương Lan and Chí Tâm
9.	"Còn lại nỗi cô đơn"	Nhật Ngân (Vietnamese lyrics)	Nguyễn Hưng
10.	"Ảo ảnh"	Y Vân	Mỹ Huyền
11.	"Nếu anh đừng hẹn"	Lê Dinh; Dạ Cầm	Hoàng Lan

Tape 2
No.	Title	Writer(s)	Artist(s)	Length
1.	"Copacabana"		Nguyễn Cao Kỳ Duyên, Tommy Ngô, and Lê Toàn
2.	"Nụ hôn khó quên"	Lưu Bích	Lưu Bích
3.	"Những đồi hoa sim"	Dzũng Chinh	Hoài Nam
4.	"Dấu chân tình ái"	Ngọc Trọng	Don Hồ
5.	"Tôi vẫn nhớ"	Ngân Giang	Thế Sơn and Như Quỳnh
6.	"Riêng một góc trời"	Ngô Thụy Miên	Tuấn Ngọc
7.	"I need a hero"		Lynda Trang Đài
8.	"Quê hương và mẹ hiền"	Văn Đắc Nguyên	Hương Lan
9.	"Hoa thơm bướm lượn"	Traditional	Ái Vân
10.	"Liên khúc giáng sinh"	Khúc Lan (Vietnamese lyrics)	Don Hồ, Thanh Hà, and Ngọc Hương

Notes

- Rights to the songs "Nụ hôn khó quên", "Dấu chân tình ái", "Riêng một góc trời", and "Quê hương và mẹ hiền" belonged to Thúy Nga Productions from the time of release.

Preceded by Paris By Night 37: In Las Vegas 2	Paris By Night; Paris By Night 38: In Toronto	Succeeded by Paris By Night 39: Ánh Ðèn Màu
