= Paris by Night 53: Thiên Đuờng Là Đây =

Paris by Night 53: Thiên Đường Là Đây
- Paris by Night episode
- DVD cover
- Episode no.: Episode 53
- Directed by: Richard Valverde
- Masters of ceremonies: Nguyễn Ngọc Ngạn; Nguyễn Cao Kỳ Duyên
- Filmed at: Paris, France
- Filmed on: 2000
- Venue: Studios de Paris, Euro Media France, Euro Media Group, Paris, France
- Executive producers: Marie To; Thi Huynh
- Format: 3-tape VHS; DVD
- Release date: 2000

Paris by Night 53: Thiên Đường Là Đây (Paradise is Here), was a music and entertainment program produced by Thúy Nga, released in early 2000 on a 3-set VHS. The show was made with a live audience at Thúy Nga's former anchor studio in the Studios de Paris media complex in Paris, France to welcome the arrival of the new millennium, and was hosted by Nguyễn Ngọc Ngạn and Nguyễn Cao Kỳ Duyên. The show mainly consists of duet performances, and includes a segment commemorating the works of late composer Văn Phụng, who died in 1999. In 2006, the show was republished on 2 DVDs. On November 10, 2016, the show was uploaded in three parts to the official Thúy Nga Productions YouTube channel.

== Track listing ==
Disc 1
No.	Title	Writer(s)	Artist(s)	Length
1.	"Phần Mở Đầu" (preface)		Nguyễn Ngọc Ngạn and Nguyễn Cao Kỳ Duyên
2.	"Thiên Đuờng Là Đây"	Lê Xuân Trường	Loan Châu, Bảo Hân, Lynda Trang Đài, Trúc Lam, and Trúc Linh
3.	"Hoài Niệm Dấu Yêu"	Thế Hiển	Don Hồ and Ngọc Huệ
4.	"Tình Băng Giá"	Chu Minh Ký (Vietnamese lyrics)	Nguyễn Hưng and Như Quỳnh
5.	"Hai Khía Cạnh Tình Yêu"	Lê Hựu Hà (Vietnamese lyrics)	Thiên Kim and Lây Minh
6.	"Tình Yêu, Nỗi Nhớ"	Trần Quảng Nam	Thế Sơn and Loan Châu
7.	"Nghèo" (medley)	Trần Quý; Như Phy; Lê Mộng Bảo	Trường Vũ, Mạnh Quỳnh, and Mạnh Đình
8.	"Đời Vẫn Lầm Than"	Mỹ Huyền	Trúc Lam and Trúc Linh
9.	"Một Lần Được Yêu"	Lưu Bích; Kỳ Duyên	Lưu Bích and Kỳ Duyên
10.	"Mây Hạ"	Trầm Tử Thiêng	Khánh Ly
11.	"Cô Tấm Ngày Nay"	Ngọc Châu	Như Quỳnh, Loan Châu, Bảo Hân, and Châu Ngọc
12.	"Tuyết Lạnh"	Minh Kỳ; Dạ Cầm	Hoàng Lan and Trường Vũ
13.	"Biết Phải Làm Sao"	Lan Anh (Vietnamese lyrics)	Tuấn Ngọc and Thúy Anh
14.	"Người Đàn Bà Cao Số" (comedy skit)	Thúy Nga drama group	Ái Vân, Hồng Đào, Trang Thanh Lan, and Quang Minh

Disc 2
No.	Title	Writer(s)	Artist(s)	Length
1.	"Trả Nợ Tình Xa"	Tuấn Khanh	Nguyễn Hưng and Lưu Bích
2.	"Đò Dọc"	Trầm Tử Thiêng	Mỹ Huyền and Hoàng Lan
3.	"Vì Sao Em Ơi"	Quốc Hùng	Thiên Kim and Quốc Hùng
4.	"Em Về Chàng Chẳng Cho Về" (medley)	Dân Ca	Ái Vân and Anh Dũng
5.	"I Love Who"	Tommy Ngô (lyrics)	Tommy Ngô
6.	"Căn Nhà Màu Tím" (tân cổ giao duyên)	Hoài Linh; Loan Thảo	Phi Nhung and Mạnh Quỳnh
7.	"Hãy Sống Như Mọi Người"	Chu Minh Ký	Lynda Trang Đài and Bảo Hân
8.	"Ngôi Nhà Trong Ánh Bình Minh"	Lê Xuân Trường (Vietnamese lyrics)	Ngọc Ánh
9.	"Đường Tình Hai Lối"	Tùng Châu; Khánh Uyên	Châu Ngọc, Thế Sơn, and Don Hồ
10.	"Hẹn Hò Đêm Trăng"	Nhật Ngân (Vietnamese lyrics)	Như Quỳnh and Mạnh Đình

Physical bonus tracks
No.	Title	Writer(s)	Artist(s)	Length
11.	"Giận Hờn"	Ngọc Sơn	Đặng Trường Phát
12.	"Nắng Paris, Nắng Sàigòn"	Ngô Thụy Miên	Trần Đức

Notes

- Rights to the songs "Thiên Đuờng Là Đây", "Hoài Niệm Dấu Yêu", "Tình Yêu, Nỗi Nhớ", "Đời Vẫn Lầm Than", "Một Lần Được Yêu", "Vì Sao Em Ơi", "Đường Tình Hai Lối", and "Hẹn Hò Đêm Trăng" (lyrics only) belonged to Thúy Nga Productions from the time of the VHS release in 2000. By the 2006 DVD release, rights remained only to "Một Lần Được Yêu", "Đường Tình Hai Lối", and "Hẹn Hò Đêm Trăng".

Preceded by Paris by Night 52: Giã Từ Thế Kỷ	Paris by Night; Paris by Night 53: Thiên Đuờng Là Đây	Succeeded by Paris by Night 54: In Concert
