= Paris by Night 64 =

Đêm Văn Nghệ Thính Phòng
- Paris by Night episode
- PBN 64 DVD Cover
- Episode no.: Episode 64
- Directed by: Kent Weed
- Masters of ceremonies: Nguyễn Ngọc Ngạn; Nguyễn Cao Kỳ Duyên
- Filmed at: Buena Park, California
- Filmed on: Wednesday, January 30, 2002
- Venue: Charles M. Schulz Theatre, Knott's Berry Farm
- Executive producers: Marie Tô; Paul Huỳnh
- Format: 2-Disc DVD
- Release date: 2002 (VHS) & 2006 (DVD)

Paris By Night 64: Đêm Văn Nghệ Thính Phòng is a Paris By Night program produced by Thúy Nga that was filmed at the Knott's Berry Farm, California in 2002. The MC's were Nguyễn Ngọc Ngạn and Nguyễn Cao Kỳ Duyên. To keep the show formal, this episode did not have a comedy skit, a "Hài Kịch."

Besides the regular variety programs, Thúy Nga is also well known for producing several programs that honor the famous Vietnamese composers. In the past, each of these respective programs would usually be dedicated to only one composer. However, Paris By Night 64: Đêm Văn Nghệ Thính Phòng initiates a new tradition as it features three composers together in one program. The program was dedicated to three composers: Tuấn Khanh, Vũ Thành An, and Tử Công Phụng.

== Track list (VHS) ==
=== Tape 1 ===
==== Tuấn Khanh ====
01. Hoa Soan Bên Thềm Cũ – Trúc Lam, Trúc Linh & Bảo Hân

02. Chiếc Lá Cuối Cùng – Lệ Thu

03. Quán Nửa Khuya – Phương Diễm Hạnh

04. Nhạt Nhòa – Trần Thái Hòa

05. Hai Kỷ Niệm Một Chuyến Đi – Như Quỳnh

06. Một Chiều Đông – Duy Quang

07. Nhớ Nhau – Ngọc Hạ

08. Nổi Niềm – Thái Hiền

09. Tháng 9 Dòng Sông (MTV) – Trúc Quỳnh

=== Tape 2 ===
==== Tuấn Khanh (continued) ====
10. Mùa Xuân Đầu Tiên – Như Quỳnh & Thế Sơn

==== Vũ Thành An ====
11. Liên Khúc Bài Không Tên Số 2, 3 & Cuối Cùng – Don Hồ & Thanh Hà

12. Em Đến Thăm Anh Đêm 30 – Khánh Ly

13. Bài Không Tên Số 15 – Nguyễn Hưng

14. Bài Không Tên Số 6 – Ý Lan

15. Tình Khúc Thứ Nhất – Trần Đức

16. Đừng Yêu Tôi – Lưu Bích

=== Tape 3 ===
17. Một Lần Nào Cho Tôi Gặp Lại Em – Thế Sơn

==== Tử Công Phụng ====
18. Mãi Mãi Bên Em – Từ Công Phụng

19. Trên Tháng Ngày Đã Qua – Loan Châu

20. Như Chiếc Que Diêm (MTV) – Nhật Trung

21. Mắt Lệ Cho Người – Tuấn Ngọc

22. Mùa Thu Mây Ngàn – Tuấn Ngọc & Thái Hiền

23. Giọt Lệ Cho Ngàn Sau – Khánh Hà

24. Kiếp Dã Tràng – Khánh Hà, Lưu Bích, Thúy Anh & Lan Anh

25. Behind the Scenes – Hậu Trường Sân Khấu

== Track list (DVD) ==
=== Disc 1 ===
==== Tuấn Khanh ====
01. Hoa Soan Bên Thềm Cũ – Trúc Lam, Trúc Linh & Bảo Hân

02. Chiếc Lá Cuối Cùng – Lệ Thu

03. Quán Nữa Khuya – Phương Diễm Hạnh

04. Nhạt Nhòa – Trần Thái Hòa

05. Hai Kỷ Niệm Một Chuyến Đi – Như Quỳnh

06. Một Chiều Đông – Duy Quang

07. Nhớ Nhau – Ngọc Hạ

08. Nổi Niềm – Thái Hiền

09. Tháng 9 Dòng Sông (MTV) – Trúc Quỳnh

10. Mùa Xuân Đầu Tiên – Như Quỳnh & Thế Sơn

==== Vũ Thành An ====
11. Liên Khúc Bài Không Tên Số 2, 3 & Cuối Cùng – Don Hồ & Thanh Hà

12. Em Đến Thăm Anh Đêm 30 – Khánh Ly

=== Disc 2 ===
01. Bài Không Tên Số 15 – Nguyễn Hưng

02. Bài Không Tên Số 6 – Ý Lan

03. Tình Khúc Thứ Nhất – Trần Đức

04. Đừng Yêu Tôi – Lưu Bích

05. Một Lần Nào Cho Tôi Gặp Lại Em – Thế Sơn

==== Tử Công Phụng ====
06. Mãi Mãi Bên Em – Từ Công Phụng

07. Trên Tháng Ngày Đã Qua – Loan Châu

08. Như Chiếc Que Diêm (MTV) – Nhật Trung

09. Mắt Lệ Cho Người – Tuấn Ngọc

10. Mùa Thu Mây Ngàn – Tuấn Ngọc & Thái Hiền

11. Giọt Lệ Cho Ngàn Sau – Khánh Hà

12. Kiếp Dã Tràng – Khánh Hà, Lưu Bích, Thúy Anh & Lan Anh

13. Behind the Scenes – Hậu Trường Sân Khấu

Preceded by Paris By Night 63: Dòng Thời Gian	Paris By Night; Paris By Night 64: Ðêm Văn Nghệ Thính Phòng	Succeeded by Paris By Night 65: Yêu
