= Paris by Night 82 =

Tiếu Vương Hội
- Paris by Night episode
- Poster for PBN 82
- Episode no.: Episode 82
- Directed by: Michael Watt
- Masters of ceremonies: Nguyễn Ngọc Ngạn; Nguyễn Cao Kỳ Duyên
- Filmed at: Toronto, Canada
- Filmed on: March 25th, 2006
- Venue: Studio 40, Canadian Broadcasting Centre
- Executive producers: Marie Tô; Paul Huỳnh
- Format: 2-Disc DVD
- Release date: June 22, 2006

Paris By Night 82: Tiếu Vương Hội is a Paris By Night program that was filmed at Studio 40 of the Canadian Broadcasting Centre in Toronto, Canada on Saturday, March 25, 2006. It is one of Thúy Nga's "private" shows, as in, limited seats are available, and some are only invited guests only.

== Concept ==
This program is dedicated to Vietnamese comedy and comedians. "Tiếu Vương Hội" means Comedy Festival. This program showcases 4 comedy skits (instead of the usual one in a normal musical program). Thúy Nga also throws in some songs and medleys along the show. According to Nguyễn Ngọc Ngạn, the host of the show, states that "This program is only a continuation of what Thúy Nga used to do back when it's founded, in its native country of Vietnam". To put it at that, this is not the first "Tiếu Vương Hội" program that Thúy Nga produced; however, it is the first "Tiếu Vương Hội" Paris By Night (unless you exclude the indirect successor, Paris By Night 61: Sân Khấu Cuộc Ðời, produced in 2001).

== Track list ==
=== Disc 1 ===
01. Ghen © (Huỳnh Nhật Tân) - Nguyễn Hưng

02. Liên Khúc:

1. Mưa Chiều Kỷ Niệm (Duy Yên & Quốc Kỳ)
2. Rồi Mai Tôi Ðưa Em (Trường Sa)

- Thế Sơn & Thanh Hà

03. Khi... (Vũ Tuấn Đức) - Khánh Hà

04. Hài Kịch: Madame Moon Talk Show - Quang Minh & Hồng Ðào

05. Tình Mộng © (Nguyễn Ngọc Thạch) - Ngọc Liên

06. Ðập Vỡ Cây Ðàn (Hoa Linh Bảo) - Quang Lê

07. Tân Cổ: Chữ Hiếu, Chữ Tình (Mạnh Quỳnh) - Mạnh Quỳnh, Phi Nhung & Văn Chung

08. Hài Kịch: Trúng Số Ðộc Ðắc (Kiều Oanh) - Kiều Oanh & Lê Tín

09. My Philosophy (Hollie Thanh Ngọc) - Hollie Thanh Ngọc

=== Disc 2 ===
01. Phần Mở Đầu

02. Vọng Cổ Buồn (Minh Vy) - Như Quỳnh

03. Hài Kịch: Gà Què Ăn Quẩn Cối Xay (Nhóm Kịch Thúy Nga) - Chí Tài, Kiều Linh, Phi Nhung & Uyên Chi

04. Dĩ Vãng Êm Ðềm (Tường Văn) - Dương Triệu Vũ & Vân Quỳnh

05. Ðêm Chia Tay (Thái Thịnh) - Lương Tùng Quang & Như Loan

06. Không Cần Nói (Lời Việt: Lê Xuân Trường) - Angela Trâm Anh

07. Rồi Ánh Trăng Tan (Quốc Bảo) - Lưu Bích

08. Hài Kịch: Xin Ðừng Yêu Tôi (Hữu Lộc) - Hoài Linh, Chí Tài & Hương Thủy

09. Liên Khúc:

1. Tình Khúc Tháng Sáu (Ngô Thụy Miên)
2. Ðường Xa Ướt Mưa (Đức Huy)

- Bằng Kiều & Trần Thu Hà

10. Tình Rơi © (Hồ Đăng Long) - Trần Thái Hòa

11. Người Cho Em Biết Cô Ðơn © (Nhạc: Tùng Châu & Lời Việt: Thái Thịnh) - Hồ Lệ Thu

12. Những Ngày Nắng Ðẹp (Seasons In The Sun) (Lời Việt: Phạm Duy) - Dương Triệu Vũ, Lương Tùng Quang, Adam Hồ, Vân Quỳnh, Angela Trâm Anh & Hollie Thanh Ngọc

13. Finale

- MTV Bonus Song - Ðừng Xa Em Nhé © (Thái Thịnh) (Ðạo Diễn: Minh Vy) - Minh Tuyết
- Behind The Scenes (Hậu Trường Sân Khấu)

Preceded by Paris By Night 81: Âm Nhạc Không Biên Giới 2	Paris By Night; Paris By Night 82: Tiếu Vương Hội	Succeeded by Paris By Night 83: Những Khúc Hát Ân Tình
