= Paris by Night 78 =

Đường Xưa
- Paris by Night episode
- Poster for PBN 78
- Episode no.: Episode 78
- Directed by: Michael Watt
- Masters of ceremonies: Nguyễn Ngọc Ngạn; Nguyễn Cao Kỳ Duyên
- Filmed at: Toronto, Canada
- Filmed on: June 11, 2005
- Venue: CBC Toronto Studios - Studio 40
- Executive producers: Marie Tô; Paul Huỳnh
- Format: 2-Disc DVD
- Release date: August 11, 2005

Paris By Night 78: Đường Xưa (The Path of the Past) is a Paris By Night program produced by Thúy Nga that was filmed at the Canadian Broadcasting Centre Studio #40 in Toronto, Canada on June 11, 2005. The MC's were Nguyễn Ngọc Ngạn and Nguyễn Cao Kỳ Duyên. Seats are limited to a studio audience and is considered a private event.

== Concept ==
Following the tradition of honoring famous Vietnamese composers, the program features songs from the three composers: Quốc Dũng, Châu Kỳ, and Tùng Giang.

== Track list ==
=== Disc 1 ===
==== Quốc Dũng ====
1. Chỉ Là Mùa Thu Rơi (Lời: Nguyễn Đức Cường) – Khánh Hà
2. Ngại Ngùng (Thơ: Xuân Kỷ) – Như Quỳnh
3. Liên Khúc: Quê Hương Và Mộng Ước, Biển Mộng, Bên Nhau Ngày Vui – Thanh Mai & Quốc Dũng
4. Hạt Mưa Và Nỗi Nhớ (Lời: Nguyễn Đức Cường) – Lưu Bích
5. Mắt Huế Xưa (Đinh Trầm Ca) – Hương Lan
6. Chuyện 3 Người (Thơ: Xuân Kỷ) – Mạnh Quỳnh
7. 9 Con Số, 1 Linh Hồn – Hồ Lệ Thu
8. Cơn Gió Thoảng & Trái Tim Tội Lỗi – Bằng Kiều & Thanh Hà
9. Đường Xưa (Lời: Nguyễn Đức Cường) – Ngọc Hạ
10. Thoát Ly – Minh Tuyết

==== Châu Kỳ ====
11. Túy Ca (Lời: Trương Minh Dũng) – Chế Linh
12. Liên Khúc: Khuya Nay Anh Đi Rồi, Em Không Buồn Nữa Chị Ơi, Giọt Lệ Đài Trang, Đừng Nói Xa Nhau – Phương Hồng Quế & Trúc Mai
13. Sao Chưa Thấy Hồi Âm – Hoàng Oanh
14. Tiếng Ca Đó Về Đâu (Lời: Nguyễn Tiến Thịnh) – Trường Vũ
15. Phượng Tìm Hoàng (Thơ: Đinh Hùng) – Nguyễn Hưng
16. Đàn Không Tiếng Hát – Tâm Đoan

=== Disc 2 ===
1. Phần Đầu
2. Hương Giang Còn Tôi Chờ – Quang Lê
3. Xin Làm Người Tình Cô Đơn (Lời: Hồ Đình Phương) – Thái Châu
4. Hài Kịch: Ru Lại Câu Hò (Hoài Linh) – Hoài Linh & Chí Tài

==== Tùng Giang ====
5. Biết Đến Thửơ Nào – Dương Triệu Vũ
6. Anh Đã Quên Mùa Thu (Tùng Giang & Nam Lộc) – Lưu Bích, Như Quỳnh & Khánh Hà
7. Tôi Với Trời Bơ Vơ – Trần Thu Hà
8. Paris Và Em – Trần Thái Hòa
9. Chỉ Riêng Mình Em Hiểu – Ngọc Liên
10. Biển Vắng – Bằng Kiều
11. Cuộc Tình Xưa – Thế Sơn
12. Người Tình Người Đẹp Xinh Xinh – Thủy Tiên
13. Finale
- Behind the Scenes (Hậu Trường Sân Khấu)
- Quảng Cáo Sản Phẩm Mới (Ads)

| Preceded by Paris By Night 77: 30 Năm Viễn Xứ | Paris By Night; Paris By Night 78: Đường Xưa | Succeeded by Paris By Night 79: Dreams |
