= Paris by Night 81 =

Âm Nhạc Không Biên Giới 2
- Paris by Night episode
- Poster for PBN 81
- Episode no.: Episode 81
- Directed by: Michael Watt
- Masters of ceremonies: Nguyễn Ngọc Ngạn; Nguyễn Cao Kỳ Duyên
- Filmed at: Long Beach, California
- Filmed on: January 21, 2006
- Venue: Terrace Theater - Long Beach Convention and Entertainment Center
- Executive producers: Marie Tô; Paul Huỳnh
- Format: 2-Disc DVD
- Release date: April 20, 2006

Paris By Night 81: Âm Nhạc Không Biên Giới 2 is a Paris By Night program produced by Thúy Nga Productions that was filmed at the Terrace Theater at the Long Beach Convention and Entertainment Center in California on Saturday, January 21, 2006, the first show of 2006. It is a direct continuation of Paris By Night 62: Âm Nhạc Không Biên Giới, that was released at the end of 2001.

== Concept ==
"Âm Nhạc Không Biên Giới" means in English, "Music Without Borders", and like the title itself and its past program of Paris By Night 62: Âm Nhạc Không Biên Giới, the program features songs and skit acts that was translated into Vietnamese that was originally foreign origin. PBN 62 was not a major success so the theme of "Music Without Borders" was dropped off by the producers....Until direct competitor "Asia Entertainment" had a big success with a similar theme in video 42 (2004) "Music Around The World / Âm Nhạc Vòng Quanh Thế Giới" which was a big success. Thuy Nga producers then decided to try again with PBN 81 but it was again a big failure. Most songs are from France, England, the Americas, and the Latin world. However, one part to be said is that this program featured three South Korean singers that performed in a taped stage set. They did not perform live to the audience, rather, were part of a taped segment that appeared at the end of Part I. The three South Korean singers were Jeon Hye-bin, Kim Jong-kook, and Im Tae-kyung.

Some untranslated songs include the top 1970s band, Boney M., that were dedicated in a medley that included songs like Bahama Mama and Sunny (Coincidentally, Boney M. had previously appeared in Paris by Night in 1996 performing a medley). Also, A Time for Us, that was performed in the hit movie, Romeo and Juliet that was directed by Franco Zeffirelli in 1968. Also, Hot Stuff that was performed by Donna Summer. Finally, the hit classic song, If You Go Away.

== Track listing ==
=== Disc 1 (Korean town) ===
01. Hòn Vọng Phu 1 (Lê Thương) - Thế Sơn

02. Chuyện Một Chiếc Cầu Đã Gẫy (Trầm Tử Thiêng) - Quang Lê

03. Em Về Miệt Thứ (Hà Phương) - Hương Thủy

04. Lời Hát Kinh Cầu (Minh Châu) - Ngọc Liên

05. Còn Thương Rau Đắng Mọc Sau Hè (Bắc Sơn) - Như Quỳnh

06. Tát Nước Đầu Đình (Đào Duy Anh) - Vân Quỳnh & Adam Hồ

07. Phỏng Vấn nữ nghệ sĩ Thuý Nga

08. Tân Cổ: Ơn Nghĩa Sinh Thành (Tân Nhạc: Dương Thiệu Tước & Vọng Cổ: Mạnh Quỳnh) - Mạnh Quỳnh & Bé Xuân Mai

09. Đã Không Yêu Thì Thôi © (Hoài An) - Minh Tuyết

10. Phỏng Vấn Minh Tuyết

11. Cò Tây, Cò Ta - Lữ Liên & Hoàng Thi Thao

12. Đêm Màu Hồng (Minh Vy) - Lương Tùng Quang

13. Khúc Ca Mùa Đông (처음부터 지금까지) (Ryu. Lời Việt: Hoàng Tuấn Nghĩa) - Dương Triệu Vũ

14. Những Ngày Đẹp Trời (Lời Việt: Hồ Văn Quân) - Bằng Kiều

15. 2 A.M. - Jeon Hye-bin

16. To Her Man - Kim Jong-kook

17. Love Will Throw Away Love - Tae Kyung Im

=== Disc 2 (Usa) ===
01. Phỏng Vấn Nhạc Sĩ Đức Thành

02. Hoa Hồng Tình Yêu (Mon amie la rose) (Cécile Caulier and Jacques Lacombe. originally performed by Françoise Hardy Lời Việt: Lê Xuân Trường) - Loan Châu

03. Phỏng Vấn Nghệ Sĩ Lữ Liên

04. Liên Khúc Âm Nhạc Không Biên Giới:

1. Speak Softly Love - **Tuấn Ngọc**
2. Lá Thu Vàng (Les feuilles mortes by Joseph Kosma)- **Khánh Hà**
3. Diễm Xưa - **Khánh Ly**
4. Chiều Tím - **Lệ Thu**
5. Anh Hùng Xạ Điêu - **Thế Sơn & Như Quỳnh**

05. Lãng Tử Tình Yêu (Lời Việt: Lê Xuân Trường) - Nguyễn Hưng

06. Hài Kịch: Con Đường Nghệ Thuật Chông Gai (Nhóm Kịch Thúy Nga) - Hoài Linh, Chí Tài, Kiều Linh, Uyên Chi, Bé Tí & Hoài Tâm

07. Phỏng Vấn Loan Châu

08. My Way (Comme d'habitude) (Claude François) - Hollie Thanh Ngọc & Angela Trâm Anh

09. Adieu Mon Pays (Enrico Macias. Lời Việt: Khánh Ly) - Khánh Ly

10. A Time For Us (Lời Việt: Phạm Duy) - Như Loan

11. Phỏng Vấn Tom Treutler

12. Liên Khúc: Bahama Mama & Sunny (Boney M) - Bảo Hân & Thủy Tiên

13. Phỏng Vấn nghệ sĩ nhạc cụ cổ truyền Văn Thịnh

14. If You Go Away (Ne me quitte pas) (Jacques Brel) - Trần Thái Hòa

15. Et Maintenant (Gilbert Bécaud)- Khánh Hà & Tuấn Ngọc

16. Maria Magdalena (Tony Wegas song) (Christian Kolonovits) (Lời Việt: Hoài An) - Hồ Lệ Thu

17. Hot Stuff (Donna Summer song) - Lưu Bích

18. Finale

| Preceded by Paris By Night 80: Tết Khắp Mọi Nhà | Paris By Night; Paris By Night 81: Âm Nhạc Không Biên Giới 2 | Succeeded by Paris By Night 82: Tiếu Vương Hội |
