= Paris by Night Divas =

Paris By Night Divas
- Paris by Night episode
- The poster for the Paris By Night Divas DVD
- Directed by: Alan Carter
- Masters of ceremonies: Nguyễn Ngọc Ngạn; Nguyễn Cao Kỳ Duyên
- Filmed at: Buena Park, California
- Filmed on: January 20, 2010
- Venue: Charles M. Schulz Theater, Knott's Berry Farm
- Executive producers: Marie Tô; Paul Huỳnh
- Format: 2 DVDs
- Release date: June 2010

Paris By Night Divas - Đêm hội ngộ của các nữ siêu sao (Divas' Reunion Night) is a musical variety show produced by Thúy Nga, taping at Knott's Berry Farm on 20 January 2010. The program lasts about five hours, with Nguyễn Ngọc Ngạn and Nguyễn Cao Kỳ Duyên as MCs. This is a special Paris By Night, as this is a tribute for the divas.

The show is to present the 24 divas of Thúy Nga. Nguyễn Ngọc Ngạn is the only MC on the stage during the show, as Kỳ Duyên was the backstage host. This show, unlike other Paris By Night shows, does not include a comedy skit.

== Performances ==
=== Disc 1 ===
1. Thương Nhau Ngày Mưa - Lưu Bích, Minh Tuyết, Như Quỳnh, Hồ Lệ Thu, Như Loan, Thủy Tiên, Thanh Hà, Ngọc Anh

2. Nếu Đã Yêu - Lam Anh

3. Tin Yêu Tàn Phai - Kỳ Phương Uyên

4. I’ll Go This Way - Bảo Hân

5. Sang Ngang - Hương Giang

6. Tình Ngăn Cách - Quỳnh Vi

7. Hàn Mặc Tử - Mai Thiên Vân

8. Tựa Vào Vai Anh - Tú Quyên

9. Vàng Son Một Thuở Yêu Em - Nguyệt Anh

10. Hững Hờ - Hồ Lệ Thu

11. Tủi Phận - Phi Nhung

12. Chuyện Người Con Gái - Hương Thủy

13. Dấu Chân Địa Đàng - Khánh Ly

=== Disc 2 ===
1. Cỏ Hồng - Khánh Hà

2. Dạ Cổ Hoài Lang - Hương Lan

3. La Vie En Rose - Ý Lan

4. Trên Đỉnh Phù Vân - Ngọc Hạ

5. Tình Phụ Tôi - Lưu Bích

6. Liên Khúc Mưa – Minh Tuyết

7. Liên Khúc: Nước Cuốn Hoa Trôi & Tình Nàng La Lan - Như Quỳnh

8. Tình Lỡ - Thanh Hà

9. Mùa Thu Chết - Ngọc Anh

10. Em Muốn Tin Anh - Như Loan

11. Voyage, Voyage - Thủy Tiên

12. Cát Bụi Tình Xa - Kỳ Phương Uyên, Quỳnh Vi, Tú Quyên, Lam Anh, Nguyệt Anh, Hương Giang

13. Làm Sao Giữ Được Anh - Tóc Tiên

=== Bonus MTV ===
1. Tầm Gửi - Diễm Sương

2. Vì Trái Tim Ngây Thơ - Thanh Quỳnh

3. Đêm Nhớ Người Tình - Quỳnh Dung

4. Behind the Scenes (Hậu Trường Sân Khấu)

Preceded by Paris By Night 99: Tôi là người Việt Nam	Paris By Night; Paris By Night: Divas	Succeeded by Paris By Night 100: Ghi nhớ một chặng đường
