= Nguyễn Ánh 9 =

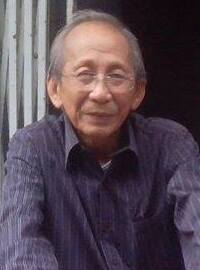
- Nguyễn Ánh 9 in 2016

Background information
- Born: Nguyễn Đình Ánh; 1 January 1940; Ninh Thuận Province, Vietnam
- Died: 14 April 2016 (aged 76) Ho Chi Minh City, Vietnam
- Occupations: Songwriter; pianist
- Instrument: Piano
- Years active: 1958–2016

Nguyễn Đình Ánh (1 January 1940 – 14 April 2016, baptismal name Jerome), known professionally as Nguyễn Ánh 9, was a Vietnamese songwriter and pianist.

== Early life ==
Born in Ninh Thuận Province, Vietnam, he was the youngest of the three children in a well-off Catholic family. His Christian name was Jerome. His family moved to Nha Trang and when he was 11 years old, then relocated to Saigon. Nguyen studied at Taberd, a Catholic college in Saigon, until 1954. He then went to Da Lat to study at Yersin as a boarder until 1958. He left his family when he was 18 to pursue a music career. He practiced the piano as a young boy and while studying in Da Lat, Nguyen befriended songwriter Hoang Nguyen and was guided to the music industry by him.

== Career ==
After earning his baccalaureate degree, and with Hoang Nguyen's recommendation, Nguyen Anh 9 was able to participate in the program Tuoi Xanh (Youth) by Saigon Radio Station and Da Lat Radio Station. He also collaborated with Duy Trác on the program Tieng hat sinh vien (Students' voice). Since then, Nguyen Anh 9 played the piano here and there at the well-known bars and restaurants and in the young bands. He started his songwriting career in a very accidental way when touring Japan with Khánh Ly. He was waiting at the elevator with Khanh Ly to return to his hotel room after the show at Osaka fair. Seeing the sadness on her friend's face, Khánh Ly asked: "Are you still in love with her?" and meant to ask about Nguyen Anh 9's then girlfriend. He played the guitar he was holding right away and sang: "Không! Không! Tôi không còn, tôi không còn yêu em nữa..." ("No! No! I'm no longer, I'm no longer in love with you..."). When coming back to Vietnam, Khánh Ly suggested he write this song. At her suggestion, he finished writing his first song in a short time.

The song "Không" ("No") was first recorded by Khánh Ly on vinyl with the disc title Tình ca quê hương (Native land love songs). "Không" became one of the signature songs of Elvis Phương's singing career, as well as some other Nguyen Anh 9's songs including "Ai đưa em về" ("Who takes you home"), "Chia phôi" ("Parting") and "Một lời cuối cho em" ("One last word for you"), onstage at the Queen Bee discothèque in Saigon in early 1970s. In the early 1970s, Nguyen Anh 9 collaborated with many major discothèques in Saigon. He used to play the piano and accompany such famous singers as Khánh Ly and Thái Thanh. Nguyen Anh 9 said in an interview that he liked to accompany these two well-known singers the most. At the same time, he wrote some other famous songs like "Mùa thu cánh nâu" ("Brown-winged Autumn") and "Đêm tình yêu" ("Night of Love").

After the Fall of Saigon in April 1975, he toured the provinces with Duy Khánh's troupe and with songwriter Quoc Dung. From 1976-78, he worked as a vehicle traffic controller at the Western Bus Station. Nguyen Anh 9 opened a piano class for a while. In 1982, he returned to the music industry. He continued to take part in the concerts and piano shows in many places. He was invited to write the soundtracks for some movies such as "Mảnh tình nghiệt ngã" ("Ill-fated love affair"), "Mênh mông tình buồn" ("Immensely sad love"). In the late 1980s and early 1990s, he wrote new songs including "Tình yêu đến trong giã từ" ("Comes farewell comes love"), "Cho người tình xa" ("For the remote lover"), and "Cô đơn" ("Lonely").

== Tribute ==
On 27 May 2006, Thúy Nga Productions put on the live variety show Paris by Night 83 with the theme Những khúc hát ân tình (Songs of Affection) in California, USA to pay tribute to three Vietnamese songwriters during which the singers performed 11 songs by Nguyen Anh 9. On the night of 21 November 2010, the program Con đường âm nhạc (The music path) of November paying tribute to Nguyen Anh 9 took place at the Military Theatre, Ho Chi Minh City and was broadcast live on VTV3.

== Personal life ==
His wife's name was Ngọc Hân. She was a dancer whom he knew when working at Anh Vu discothèque. They wed in 1965 after he had his mother beg his father to let him return home. His father had evicted him from their home due to Nguyễn Ánh 9's determination to pursue a music career. The couple had two sons: Nguyen Quang and Nguyen Dinh Quang Anh, both of whom pursued careers in music.

== Death ==
After suffering from pneumonia and heart failure for a long time, he went into a coma and died at Ho Chi Minh City Medicine and Pharmacy University on 14 April 2016, aged 76.

Previously, he had been hospitalized at a Ho Chi Minh City hospital, Bệnh viện Đa Khoa Hoàn Mỹ Sài Gòn, on 20 March 2016 after showing signs of asphyxia and fatigue.

== Some other details ==
- The stage name Nguyen Anh 9 was given by his first lover. He said in an interview: "This is the name she gave me. When I wrote the first songs, the real name Nguyen Dinh Anh was too long and Nguyen Anh was the name of the Emperor Gia Long. Therefore, she said there were 9 letters in Nguyen Anh and number 9 was a lucky number according to oriental people's conception so the pen name should be Nguyen Anh 9."
- As to the song Không, he gave a different answer during an interview: "At the end of 1969–1970, I was touring France with a domestic troupe including Khanh Ly. One night it turned cold and Khanh Ly and I were strolling. A melody suddenly came to me and I tried humming it on my own. Khanh Ly heard it and said: "That sounds good. Sing on...". Thus, the song Không was born and was very successfully performed by Elvis Phuong."

== Songs ==
- Ai đưa em về (Who takes you home)
- Biệt khúc (Parting song)
- Bơ vơ (Desolate)
- Buồn ơi chào mi (Hello sadness)
- Chia phôi (Parting)
- Cho người tình xa (For the remote lover)
- Cô đơn (Lonely)
- Đêm nay ai đưa em về (Who takes you home tonight)
- Đêm tình yêu (Night of love)
- Không (No)
- Không 2 (No 2)
- Kỷ niệm (Memory)
- Lối về (The way back)
- Mẹ Việt Nam ơi, chúng con vẫn còn đây (thơ Hoàng Phong Linh) (Mother Vietnam, we're still here) [Poem by Hoang Phong Linh]
- Mênh mông tình buồn (Immensely sad love)
- Một lời cuối cho em (One last word for you)
- Mùa hè 42 (viết lời Việt) (Summer 42 [Vietnamese lyrics])
- Mùa thu cánh nâu (Brown-winged autumn)
- Tiếng hát lạc loài (Cô đơn 3) (Solitary voice [Lonely 3])
- Tình khúc chiều mưa (Rainy sunset love song)
- Tình yêu đến trong giã từ (Comes farewell comes love)
- Trọn kiếp đơn côi (Lifelong solitariness)
- Xin đừng nói yêu tôi (Please don't say you love me)
- Xin như làn mây trắng (Like a white cloud)

== Works after 1975 ==
- The CD Lặng lẽ tiếng dương cầm (The quiet piano sound) including 13 songs (Viet Tan – Kim Loi Studio).
- The LP Nguyễn Ánh 9 - Lặng lẽ tiếng dương cầm (Nguyen Anh 9 - The quiet piano sound) including ten songs (a collaboration between the songwriter Duc Tri and Gia Dinh Audio).
- The live show Nguyễn Ánh 9 - Nửa thế kỷ âm nhạc (Nguyen Anh 9 - Half a century of music) taking place in Hanoi on the night of 29 December 2011. Nine artists and a band with nine members and nine violins coming from Vietnam National Academy of Music joined the second part of the show. Nguyen Anh 9 himself played the piano and accompanied the artists and the band.
