= Paris by Night 59 =

Cây Đa Bến Cũ
- Paris by Night episode
- PBN 59 VHS Cover
- Episode no.: Episode 59
- Directed by: Danielle Phương Thảo; Michael Watt
- Masters of ceremonies: Biên Soạn: Nguyễn Ngọc Ngạn
- Filmed at: Toronto, Canada; Việt Nam
- Filmed on: 2000
- Venue: Studio 40, Canadian Broadcasting Centre, Toronto, Ontario, Canada
- Executive producers: Marie Tô; Huỳnh Thi
- Format: 3-Tape VHS; 2-Disc DVD
- Release date: 2001 (VHS); 2006 (DVD)

Paris By Night 59: Cây Đa Bến Cũ is a Paris By Night TV program produced by Thúy Nga that was filmed at CBC Toronto Studios - Studio 40, Toronto, Canada in 2000. Nguyễn Ngọc Ngạn was the master of ceremonies for this program. This was a volume in the series Paris By Night that did not include a comedy skit or have something known as a "Hài Kịch". The DVD version of Paris By Night (number 59) required only a single disc, while the VHS version is a three-tape set. This program had no audience. On April 25, 2019, the show was uploaded in its entirety to the official Thúy Nga Productions YouTube channel.

== Track list (DVD) ==
01. Phần Mở Đầu (Introduction)

02. Trở Về (Châu Kỳ) – Thiên Kim

03. Lúa Mùa Duyên Thắm (Trịnh Hưng) – Như Quỳnh & Thế Sơn

04. Căn Nhà Xưa (Nguyễn Đình Toàn) – Khánh Ly

05. Ai Về Sông Tương (Thông Đạt) – Nguyễn Hưng

06. Bến Xuân (Văn Cao) – Anh Dũng

07. Nỗi Buồn Chim Sáo © (Huỳnh Ngọc Đông & Đinh Trầm Ca) – Phi Nhung

08. Người Đẹp Bình Dương (Võ Đông Điền) – Hoàng Lan

09. Lối Về Xóm Nhỏ (Trịnh Hưng) – Lynda Trang Đài & Tommy Ngô

10. Điều Có Thật © (Thế Hiển phỏng thơ Xuân Quỳ) – Trường Vũ

11. Nếu Biết Tôi Lấy Chồng (Song Ngọc) – Phương Diễm Hạnh

12. Nắng Chiều (Lê Trọng Nguyễn) – Thế Sơn

13. Huyền Thoại Ngũ Hành Sơn © (Vũ Đức Sao Biển) – Tường Nguyên

14. Chuyển Bến (Đoàn Chuẩn & Từ Linh) – Lưu Bích

15. Làng Tôi (Chung Quân) – Như Quỳnh

16. Nếu Anh Về Bên Em (Huỳnh Anh) – Trúc Lam, Trúc Linh & Loan Châu

17. Câu Hát Tình Quê (Trần Quang Lộc) – Mạnh Quỳnh

18. Gái Nhà Nghèo (Cô Phượng) – Mỹ Huyền

19. Dưới Giàn Hoa Cũ (Tuấn Khanh) – Tuấn Ngọc

20. Dưới Bóng Tre Làng (Hoàng Châu) – Loan Châu

21. Ru Nửa Vầng Trăng (Huy Phương) – Đặng Trường Phát

22. Biệt Ly (Dzoãn Mẫn) – Ý Lan

23. Hội Trùng Dương (Phạm Đinh Chương) – Như Quỳnh, Thiên Kim & Phi Nhung

== Track list (VHS) ==
=== Tape 1 ===
01. Trở Về (Châu Kỳ) – Thiên Kim

02. Lúa Mùa Duyên Thắm (Trịnh Hưng) – Như Quỳnh & Thế Sơn

03. Căn Nhà Xưa (Nguyễn Đình Toàn) – Khánh Ly

04. Ai Về Sông Tương (Thông Đạt) – Nguyễn Hưng

05. Bến Xuân (Văn Cao) – Anh Dũng

06. Nỗi Buồn Chim Sáo © (Huỳnh Ngọc Đông & Đinh Trầm Ca) – Phi Nhung

07. Người Đẹp Bình Dương (Võ Đông Điền) – Hoàng Lan

=== Tape 2 ===
08. Lối Về Xóm Nhỏ (Trịnh Hưng) – Lynda Trang Đài & Tommy Ngô

09. Điều Có Thật © (Thế Hiển phỏng thơ Xuân Quỳ) – Trường Vũ

10. Nếu Biết Tôi Lấy Chồng (Song Ngọc) – Phương Diễm Hạnh

11. Nắng Chiều (Lê Trọng Nguyễn) – Thế Sơn

12. Huyền Thoại Ngũ Hành Sơn © (Vũ Đức Sao Biển) – Tường Nguyên

13. Chuyển Bến (Đoàn Chuẩn & Từ Linh) – Lưu Bích

14. Làng Tôi (Chung Quân) – Như Quỳnh

=== Tape 3 ===
15. Nếu Anh Về Bên Em (Huỳnh Anh) – Trúc Lam, Trúc Linh & Loan Châu

16. Câu Hát Tình Quê (Trần Quang Lộc) – Mạnh Quỳnh

17. Gái Nhà Nghèo (Cô Phượng) – Mỹ Huyền

18. Dưới Giàn Hoa Cũ (Tuấn Khanh) – Tuấn Ngọc

19. Dưới Bóng Tre Làng (Hoàng Châu) – Loan Châu

20. Ru Nửa Vầng Trăng (Huy Phương) – Đặng Trường Phát

21. Biệt Ly (Dzoãn Mẫn) – Ý Lan

22. Hội Trùng Dương (Phạm Đinh Chương) – Như Quỳnh, Thiên Kim & Phi Nhung

Những nhạc phẩm: "Nỗi Buồn Chim Sáo, Điều Có Thật, Huyền Thoại Ngũ Hành Sơn" đã được độc quyền cho trung tâm Thúy Nga với sự đồng ý của tác giả. Cấm sử dụng dưới mọi hình thức. (The song "Chim Sadness, This Is It, Legendary Marble" has been exclusive for Thúy Nga center with the consent of the author. Prohibited use in any form.)

Preceded by Paris By Night 58: Những Sắc Màu Trong Kỷ Niệm	Paris By Night; Paris By Night 59: Cây Đa Bến Cũ	Succeeded by Paris By Night 60: Thất Tình
