= Paris by Night 102 =

Paris By Night 102 Nhạc yêu cầu - Tình Ca Lam Phương
- Paris by Night episode
- Episode no.: Episode 102
- Directed by: Alan Carter
- Masters of ceremonies: Nguyễn Ngọc Ngạn; Nguyễn Cao Kỳ Duyên
- Filmed at: Buena Park, California
- Filmed on: February 12–13, 2011
- Venue: Charles M. Schulz Theatre, Knott's Berry Farm
- Executive producers: Marie Tô; Paul Huỳnh
- Format: DVD
- Release date: April 15, 2011

Paris By Night 102: (Nhạc yêu cầu - Tình Ca Lam Phương) is a Vietnamese Paris By Night program produced by Thúy Nga Productions. Filming began on February 12 and 13, 2011 at Charles M. Schulz Theatre in Recreation Knott's Berry Farm, Buena Park, California. The theme continues from Paris By Night 92: Nhạc yêu cầu and Paris by Night 96: Nhạc yêu cầu 2 but limited requirements required of the audience in the songs of composer Lam Phuong. The majority of performances were live theater performances and were filmed live. The DVD was released on April 15, 2011. In the DVD, Thuy Nga changed the mix is made by musician Hoai Phuong instead of Tung Chau and other musicians like the majority of previous productions of Paris by Night.

== Track list ==
Disc 1

01. Liên Khúc:

- Mùa Thu Yêu Đương
- Bé Yêu

- Tóc Tiên, Mai Tiến Dũng

02. Mưa Lệ - Thanh Hà

03. Tình Chết Theo Mùa Đông - Thái Châu & Giọt Lệ Sầu - Hương Lan

04. Kiếp tha hương - Khánh Ly

05. Cho Em Quên Tuổi Ngọc - Lam Anh

06. Kiếp Phiêu Bồng - Trịnh Lam

07. Lạy Trời Con Được Bình Yên - Khánh Hà

08. Liên Khúc:

- Khóc Thầm
- Buồn Chi Em Ơi

- Duy Trường, Phi Nhung

09. Một Đời Tan Vỡ - Lưu Bích

10. Thuyền Không Bến Đỗ - Như Quỳnh

11. Thu Sầu - Ngọc Hạ

12. Thành phố Buồn - Don Hồ

13. Tình Nghĩa Đôi Ta

Chỉ Thế Thôi - Hồ Lệ Thu

14. Hài Kịch: "Trăm Nhớ Ngàn người ta có nhiều chuyện v Thương" - Chí Tài, Hoài Linh

Disc 2

15. Tình Đẹp Như Mơ - Lương Tùng Quang

16. Biển Tình - Diễm Sương

17. Xin Thời Gian Qua Mau - Quang Lê

18. Đèn Khuya - Mai Thiên Vân

19. Như Giấc Chiêm Bao - Thế Sơn

20. Hạnh Phúc Trong Tầm Tay - Kỳ Phương Uyên

21. Xót Xa - Trần Thái Hòa

22. Em Đi Rồi - Ngọc Anh

23. Lầm - Nguyễn Hưng

24. Rừng Xưa - Hương Thủy

25. Liên Khúc:

- Em Là Tất Cả
- Duyên Kiếp
- Cỏ Úa

- Minh Tuyết, Bằng Kiều

26. Bài Thơ Không Đoạn Kết - Thu Phương

27. Liên Khúc:

- Tình Đau
- Yêu Nhau Bốn Mùa

- Quỳnh Vi, Như Loan

BONUS: Hậu trường sân khấu

Preceded by Paris By Night 101: Hạnh Phúc Đầu Năm	Paris By Night; Paris By Night 102: Nhạc Yêu Cầu - Tình Ca Lam Phương	Succeeded by Paris By Night 103: Tình Sử Trong Âm Nhạc Việt Nam
