= Thanh Hà (disambiguation) =

Thanh Hà may refer to:

- Thanh Hà, a commune of Haiphong
- Thanh Hà district, a rural district of Hải Dương province
- Thanh Hà (singer)
