= Thái Thanh =

Vietnamese-American singer (1934–2020)

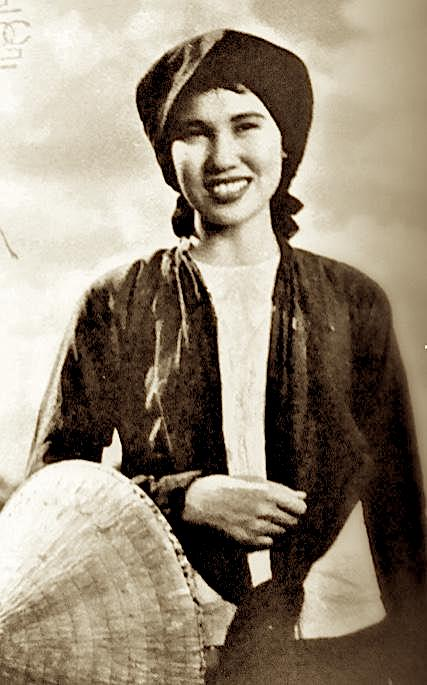
- Born: Phạm Thị Băng Thanh; August 5, 1934; Hanoi, Tonkin Protectorate, French Indochina
- Died: March 17, 2020 (aged 85); Orange County, California, U.S
- Occupation: Singer
- Years active: 1947–2002
- Known for: Vietnamese pop icon
- Notable work: Trường ca Hòn Vọng Phu, Thiên Thai, Mẹ Việt Nam, Tình hoài hương.
- Spouse: Lê Quỳnh
- Children: Ý Lan, Quỳnh Hương, Lê Xuân Việt, Lê Đại
- Relatives: Phạm Đình Chương, Thái Hằng, Phạm Duy
- Musical career
- Origin: Hanoi, Saigon
- Genre: Tân nhạc
- Instrument: Vocal
- Labels: Continental, Diem Xua production, Thuy Nga
- Formerly of: The Thăng Long

Thái Thanh (born Phạm Thị Băng Thanh; August 5, 1934 – March 17, 2020) was a Vietnamese-American singer. She was one of the most iconic singers of the Western-influenced popular music in Vietnam, known as 'New music of Vietnam' (Tân nhạc).

== Early and family life ==
Thái Thanh was born in 1934 in the village of Bạch Mai, Hanoi, in an artistic-traditioned family. Her father, Phạm Đình Phụng, had 2 wives - the first one gave birth to Phạm Đình Sỹ and Phạm Đình Viêm; the second one gave birth to Phạm Thị Quang Thái (Thái Hằng), Phạm Đình Chương, and Phạm Thị Băng Thanh.

Thái Thanh started her career before the First Indochina War when she was 14 years old, without any formal music education. She learned about singing from her informal knowledge of northern Vietnamese folk songs and French music books, which she later fused in her performances.

She was a member of her family-based band, Thăng Long, one of the first widely known music bands in Vietnam during the 20th century. She began her solo career and adopted her stage name Thái Thanh in 1950. Her older sister Phạm Thị Quang Thái was a famous singer under the stage name Thái Hằng, and her older brother Phạm Đình Chương was a prominent musical figure and singer under the stage name Hoài Bắc. Her brother-in-law was the leading songwriter Phạm Duy, who was married to Thái Hằng.

In 1956, Thái Thanh married Lê Quỳnh, and they had three daughters and two sons together: Ý Lan (1957), Lê Việt (1958), Quỳnh Dao (1960), Thanh Loan (1962) and Lê Đại (1964).

== Career ==
Thái Thanh later gained her prestige in the record industry and pop culture in South Vietnam during the Vietnam War. She was famous for her performances of works by musicians including Đặng Thế Phong, Lê Thương, Văn Cao, Dương Thiệu Tước, Phạm Đình Chương, and especially Phạm Duy, her brother-in-law, with whom she had a long-lasting collaboration. Some of her most well-known songs, written by Phạm Duy, were Dòng sông xanh, Cho nhau, Nương chiều, Bà mẹ Gio Linh and Kỷ niệm.

During the early 1970s, she and Thăng Long band regularly performed at the Đêm màu hồng (Pink Night) nightclub.

After 1975, Thái Thanh was banned from performing publicly due to her refusal to cooperate with the communist government of Vietnam. In 1985, she emigrated and became part of the Vietnamese musical diaspora in Orange County, California.

Thái Thanh continued her music career amongst the Vietnamese community in the United States and Canada. In 2000, she suffered a brain haemorrhage, and announced her retirement in 2002, after 55 years of contribution to the music industry and pop culture of Vietnam throughout the 20th century. However, she did continue to appear on the music scene sporadically.

In 2005, an event named "Vinh danh Thái Thanh, tiếng hát vượt thời gian" (In honor of Thái Thanh, the timeless singer) was held in Montreal, Canada. The event was participated by Thái Thanh and many other famous singers of the next generation - including Tuấn Ngọc, Ý Lan, Trần Thu Hà, etc. In 2006, she returned in the event "Thái Thanh và ba thế hệ" (Thái Thanh - three generations).

Thái Thanh's unique style of singing combined Tonkinese folk music, French popular music, and Western opera. This pioneering singing style, had a significant impact on many younger singers and artists even after the Fall of Saigon.

== Death ==
Thái Thanh died on March 17, 2020, in Orange County, California. In 2017, according to her eldest daughter Ý Lan, she had been in very poor health. According to the government-run newspaper Tuoi Tre, her voice was the most archetypal of Tân nhạc, and that she was 'a voice that spanned generations'. It described her death as a 'great loss' for Vietnamese music.
