= Ái Liên =

Vietnamese cải lương actress and singer

NSND Ái Liên
- Born: Lê Thị Ái Liên; November 25, 1920; Haiphong, Vietnam
- Died: July 31, 1991 (aged 70)
- Occupations: Cải lương and singer
- Years active: 1934–1984
- Agent: Vietnam National Cailuong Theatre
- Title: NSƯT (1984); NSND (1997)
- Spouse: Hà Quang Định
- Children: 14, including Ái Vân

Hélène Lê Thị Liên, popularly known as Ái Liên (Hải Phòng 1918/1920-1991), was a Vietnamese cải lương actress and female singer. She is the mother of singer Ái Vân. Around 1938, she recorded 18 songs on 78 rpms with Kim Thoa, then again with Năm Châu.
