= Ánh Minh =

Vietnamese-American singer (born 1985)

- Born: Lê Đoàn Ánh Minh; May 16, 1985 (age 41); Ho Chi Minh City, Vietnam
- Origin: Los Angeles, California
- Genres: Vietnamese pop, Pop rock
- Labels: Asia Entertainment, Thúy Nga Productions
- Formerly of: Puriti
- Website: www.anhminh.net

Ánh Minh (born May 16, 1985) is a Vietnamese American singer. She was a member of female duo Puriti before her solo career. She is also known as one of the artists performing in Paris By Night shows.

== Background ==
Ánh Minh and her five siblings, along with her parents, left their home country by boat when Ánh Minh was two. After spending some time in refugee camps, the family settled in California.

== Career ==
Ánh Minh signed with the label Asia Entertainment in 2003, and then Thúy Nga in 2011.

=== Albums ===
- Take Control, released on August 6, 2010
- Mùa Đông Yêu Thương, released December 9, 2010
- Sunrise, released on June 20, 2013
- Love
