= Thanh Hà =

- Commune
- Interactive map of Thanh Hà
- Coordinates: 20°56′12″N 106°23′18″E
- Country: Vietnam
- Region: Red River Delta
- Municipality: Hai Phong
- Established: 16 June 2025

Area
  - Total: 25.90 km^{2} (10.00 sq mi)

Population (2025)
  - Total: 36,173
  - Density: 1,396/km^{2} (3,620/sq mi)
- Website: thanhha.haiphong.gov.vn

Thanh Hà is a commune in the municipality of Hai Phong, Vietnam.

On 12 June 2025, the National Assembly of Vietnam adopted Resolution No. 202/2025/QH15 on the reorganization of provincial-level administrative units, effective on the same date. Under the resolution, Hải Dương province was merged into Hai Phong, and the area where Thanh Hà Commune was subsequently established became part of the municipality.

On 16 June 2025, the Standing Committee of the National Assembly of Vietnam issued a resolution on the arrangement of commune-level administrative units in Hai Phong in 2025. Under the resolution, the entire area and population of Thanh Hà Township and Thanh Sơn and Thanh Tân communes were merged to form a new commune named Thanh Hà.
