= Lynda Trang Đài =

Vietnamese-American singer

- Born: Lê Quang Quý Trang Đài; October 9, 1968 (age 58); Thừa Thiên - Huế, South Vietnam (Note: Some sources like VietNamNet said she was born in Da Nang.)
- Citizenship: United States
- Occupations: Singer, businessman
- Years active: 1987–
- Spouse: Tommy Ngô (m. 1997)
- Musical career
- Origin: Westminster, California, US
- Genres: Pop; New wave; Dance pop
- Instruments: Vocals, dance
- Label: Thúy Nga Productions

Lê Quang Quý Trang Đài, also known by the stage name Lynda Trang Đài, is a Vietnamese-American singer.

== Personal life and career ==
Trang Đài was born on October 9, 1968 in Hương Thủy County, Thừa Thiên province. She moved to Hong Kong and San Diego with her family in 1978, before being raised in Orange County, California. She has appeared in many of the Paris By Night shows of Thuy Nga Productions, for example Paris By Night 36, 59, 66, 93, 94 and 100. She is noted as one of the first more provocative Vietnamese-American performers. Her racy costumes and stage antics have earned her the title "the Vietnamese Madonna," "well established but very controversial" (1999) "notoriously bold veteran" (2005). and so on.

On January 4, 2025, Đài was arrested for allegedly shoplifting an AirPods case at a Gucci store.

== Performance on stages ==
Đài has performed on the stage of Thuy Nga and other famous music brands

Year	PBN	Performance	Featuring
1987	Paris By Night 4	Gimme Your Love Tonight	Solo
1987	Paris By Night 4	Xuân Yêu Thương	Solo
1987	Paris By Night 5	Về Trên Nỗi Xót Xa	Solo
1987	Paris By Night 5	Mùa Xuân Ta Yêu Nhau	Solo
1988	Paris By Night 6	Thiên Đàng Ái Ân (Lam Phương)	Solo
1988	Paris By Night 6	Sau Ngày Cuối Tuần	Solo
1989	Paris By Night 7	Hãy Vui Đi Anh	Solo
1989	Paris By Night 9	Cold Hearted (Lời Việt: Khúc Lan)	Solo
1990	Paris By Night 10	To Make It Right	Solo
1990	Paris By Night 11	Cô Gái Yêu Vật Chất	Solo
1991	Paris By Night 13	Thời Vàng Son	Solo
1991	Paris By Night 14	Tình Hoa Bướm	Solo
1992	Paris By Night 18	Crazy Love	Solo
1993	Paris By Night 23	Liên khúc Em sẽ theo anh	Lilian, Don Hồ, Ngọc Huệ, Duy Hạnh, Hằng Nga, Phương Khanh, Huỳnh Thi, Thái Tài
1993	Paris By Night 23	Liên khúc Ðưa nhau vào cõi ân tình	Dalena, Lilian, Duy Hạnh, Phương Khanh, Ngọc Huệ, Don Hồ, Ý Nhi
1995	Paris By Night 32	Cyber Queen	Solo
1995	Paris By Night 34	So Sad (Lời Việt: Michael Thuận)	Solo
1996	Paris By Night 36	One Good Man	Solo
1996	Paris By Night 37	Stand By Me	Tommy Ngô, Thanh Hà, Don Hồ, Bảo Hân, Philip Huy, Châu Ngọc, Long Hồ
1996	Paris By Night 37	Grease	Tommy Ngô
1996	Paris By Night 38	I Need a Hero	Solo
1997	Paris By Night 39	Không (Nguyễn Ánh 9)	Bảo Hân, Tommy Ngô
1997	Paris By Night 39	Flashdance... What a Feeling (Lời Việt: Michael Thuận)	Solo
1997	Paris By Night 41	Liên khúc Xây Nhà Bên Suối, Túp Lều Lý Tưởng	Tommy Ngô
1997	Paris By Night 42	Fever	Solo
1998	Paris By Night 43	Woman In Love	Solo
1998	Paris By Night 43	Diamonds are a girl's best friend	Kỳ Duyên
1998	Paris By Night 44	Hào Hoa (Giao Tiên)	Solo
1998	Paris By Night 46	Holiday	Solo
1999	Paris By Night 47	Cái Trâm Em Cài	Phương Vy, Thiên Kim
1999	Paris By Night 47	Em Như Làn Mây	Tommy Ngô
1999	Paris By Night 48	Chiều xuân (Tác giả: Ngọc Châu)	Solo
1999	Paris By Night 50	Chàng Kiêu Kỳ (Lời: Duy Quang)	Solo
1999	Paris By Night 51	Space Invaders	Tommy Ngo
1999	Paris By Night 52	Trai Thời Nay (Lời: Lê Xuân Trường)	Bảo Hân, Phương Vy, Trúc Lam, Trúc Linh, Loan Châu
2000	Paris By Night 53	Thiên Đường Là Đây (Lê Xuân Trường)	Loan Châu, Bảo Hân, Trúc Lam, Trúc Linh
2000	Paris By Night 53	Hãy Sống Như Mọi Người (Chu Minh Ký)	Bảo Hân
2000	Paris By Night 55	Hạ Hồng (Lời Việt: Chu Minh Ký)	Tommy Ngô
2000	Paris By Night 56	Quên (Lời Việt: Duy Quang)	Solo
2000	Paris By Night 57	Got To Fight (Lời: Lynda Trang Đài)	Solo
2000	Paris By Night 57	Bốn Màu Áo (Thanh Viên, Anh Thy)	Như Quỳnh, Loan Châu, Trúc Lam, Trúc Linh, Bảo Hân, Yến Mai, Phi Phi
2001	Paris By Night 58	Tình Phai (Nguyễn Ngọc Tài)	Solo
2001	Paris By Night 59	Lối Về Xóm Nhỏ (Trịnh Hưng)	Tommy Ngô
2001	Paris By Night 60	Tìm Về Chốn Cũ © (Đặng Quang Vỹ)	Loan Châu, Trúc Lam, Trúc Linh
2001	Paris By Night 60	He & She (Lời: Tommy Ngô)	Tommy Ngô
2001	Paris By Night 61	Radio Buồn (Tuấn Khanh)	Tommy Ngô
2001	Paris By Night 62	Tất cả là âm nhạc (Lê Hựu Hà)	Bảo Hân, Thiên Kim, Trúc Lam, Trúc Linh, Châu Ngọc, Như Loan
2001	Paris By Night 62	Tuổi Đá Buồn (Trịnh Công Sơn)	Như Quỳnh, Thiên Kim, Trúc Lam, Trúc Linh, Châu Ngọc, Bảo Hân, Như Loan, Loan Châu, Tracy Phạm
2001	Paris By Night 62	Sky	Tommy Ngô
2002	Paris By Night 63	Dance For Me (Lời: Tommy Ngô)	Tommy Ngô
2002	Paris By Night 63	Tình khúc Cho Em (Lê Uyên Phương)	Như Quỳnh, Loan Châu, Trúc Lam, Trúc Linh, Châu Ngọc, Bảo Hân, Tú Quyên, Như Loan, Tracy Phạm
2002	Paris By Night 65	Lời Anh Hứa (Lời Việt: Duy Quang)	Tommy Ngô
2002	Paris By Night 66	Hai Trái Tim Vàng (Trịnh Lâm Ngân)	Tommy Ngô
2002	Paris By Night 67	Xin Anh Hãy Quên! (Lời Việt: Duy Quang)	Tommy Ngô
2003	Paris By Night 68	Lời Tỏ Tình Dễ Thương 2 (Ngọc Sơn)	Tommy Ngô
2003	Paris By Night 69	Liên khúc Tình Nhạt Phai	Tommy Ngô
2003	Paris By Night 71	Fame	Solo
2005	Paris By Night 79	Yêu Làm Chi? © (Huỳnh Nhật Tân)	Tommy Ngô
2005	Paris By Night 79	Khiêu Vũ Bên Nhau (Lời Việt: Vũ Xuân Hùng)	Lương Tùng Quang, Tommy Ngô, Dương Triệu Vũ, Minh Tuyết, Tâm Đoan, Bảo Hân, Tú Quyên, Hồ Lệ Thu
2008	Paris By Night 93	Yêu Nhau Đi (Lời Việt: Trường Kỳ)	Solo
2008	Paris By Night 94	LK The Final Countdown	Trizzie Phương Trinh, Tommy Ngô
2008	Paris By Night 95	Biển nhớ (Trịnh Công Sơn)	Như Loan, Bảo Hân, Thùy Vân, Hồ Lệ Thu, Thanh Hà, Nguyệt Anh
2009	Paris By Night 98	Không Muốn Yêu (Huỳnh Nhật Tân)	Bảo Hân, Tommy Ngô
2010	Paris By Night 100	Chỉ Còn Đêm Nay, Abanibi (Lời Việt: Chiêu Nghi)	Tommy Ngô
2013	Paris By Night 109	Rhythm of the Rain (John Claude Gummoe)	Tommy Ngô
2018	Paris By Night 126	Supermarket Love Affair	Solo
2023	Paris By Night 136	Touch By Touch (Lời Việt: Thái Thịnh)	Solo
