= Diễm Liên =

Vietnamese singer and actress

- Born: Đinh Diễm Liên; 17 December 1971 (age 54); Da Lat, Lâm Đồng, South Vietnam
- Occupations: Singer, Actress

Đinh Diễm Liên (born 17 December 1971) is a Vietnamese singer and actress.
