= Tâm Đoan =

Vietnamese-Canadian singer (born 1977)

Tâm Ðoan
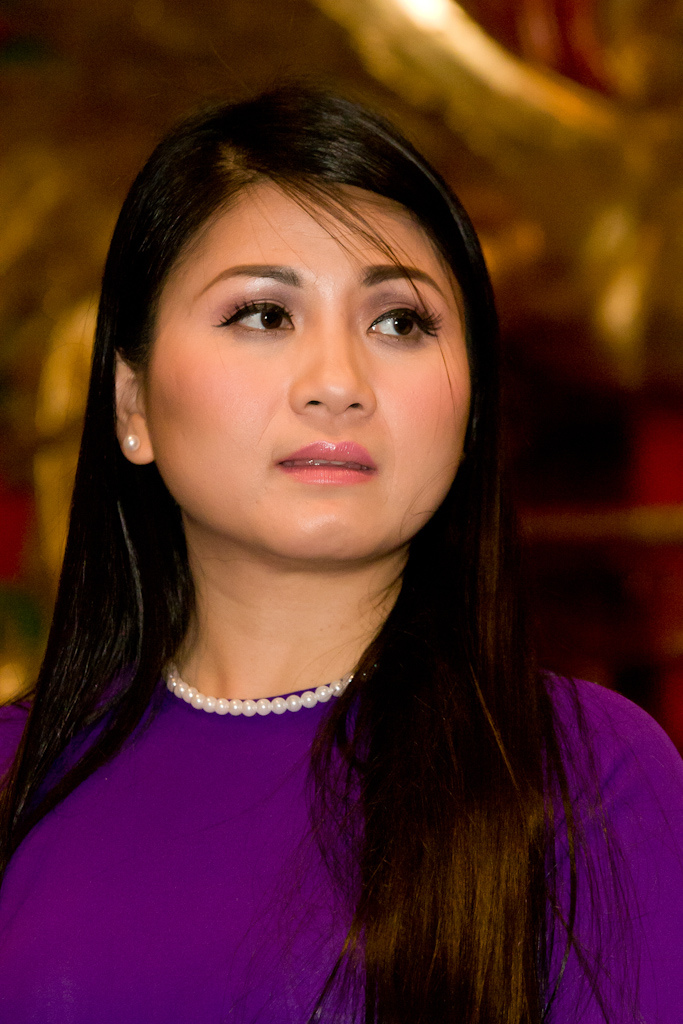
- Tam Doan in 2012

Background information
- Born: Huỳnh Ngọc Tâm Đoan; May 5, 1977 (age 49); Bình Dương, Vietnam
- Origin: Toronto, Canada
- Genre: pop
- Occupation: singer
- Labels: Thúy Nga; Vân Sơn Entertainment; Asia Entertainment
- Spouse: Tiến Dũng (m. 2006)
- Website: www.tamdoanshop.com

Tâm Đoan (born May 5, 1977) is a Vietnamese-Canadian singer. She and her sister Kristine changed their family name to "Sa" when they started their singing careers.

== Personal life ==
Tâm Đoan married Tiến Dũng (also a singer) on February 4, 2006 in Toronto, Canada. After getting married, she and her husband moved to the United States to live and develop their career. The two have 2 daughters together.

== Discography ==
Van Son Entertainment: (ordered by CD number)

- Tiếng Còi Trong Sương Đêm (CD1587)
- Anh Co Nghe Mua Roi (CD1590)
- Chong Xa (CD3100)
- Loi Thu Xua (CD3354)
- Em Con Be Lam Anh Oi (CD3364)
- Chuyen Tau Hoang Hon (CD3385)
- Tam Anh Khong Hon (CD3417)
- Mua Thu Co Nho (CD3451)
- Dem Giot Sau Roi (CD3461)
- Chuyen Tinh Di Vang (CD13738)
- Go Cua / Gia Sang Mua
- Dang Do (CD21585)
- Nhung Chuyen Tinh Bat Tu

Thúy Nga: (ordered by CD number)

- Người Mang Tâm Sự (TNCD281)
- Do Chieu w/ Phuong Diem Hanh (TNCD329)
- Kiep Ngheo w/ Phuong Diem Hanh
- Yêu Vội (TNCD349)
- Gục Ngã Vì Yêu (TNCD377)
- Tam Su Nguoi Linh Tre w/ Quang Lê

Tam Doan Entertainment: (ordered by CD number)

- Giong Ca Di Vang
- Sau Le Bong
- Tinh Yeu Chua Cao Voi (Thanh Ca)(AsiaCDCS44)

Tinh Music Production:

- Som Chong/May Chieu
- Lien Khuc Buon Nhu Hoa Phuong w/ Quoc Dung (Duy Truong) & Tuong Nguyen
- The Best Of Tam Doan "Giot Buon Khong Ten" 2CDs

Asia Entertainment:

- Xin Thoi Gian Qua Mau
- Lien Khuc: Dem Buon Tinh Le - Nhung Doi Hoa Sim
- Tuyet Lanh w/ Dang The Luan (AsiaCD293)
