= Ninh Cát Loan Châu =

- Born: September 15, 1973 (age 52); Saigon, South Vietnam
- Website: http://www.lcmusic.net

Ninh Thế Loan Châu (born September 15, 1973), known professionally as Loan Châu or formerly Ninh Cát Loan Châu, is a Vietnamese American singer. She was first discovered in 1996 by musical director Truc Ho at Asia Production. Her real name is Ninh The Loan Châu, however she combined her parents' first names (Cát, from her father and Loan, from her mother) to come up with the stage name Ninh Cát Loan Châu. She attended Đoàn Thị Điểm elementary school and Marie Curie High School. Loan Châu came to the United States in 1991, and reunited with her family in Westminster, California.

Loan Châu is the only musically inclined person in her family. As she recalled, her first experience in front of an audience was around the age of six where she sang in front of her classmates. At the age of 8, Loan Châu began writing children songs to perform for her friends. Due to this unusual gift, the teachers in her school took notice and allowed her to be part of a group of children in the entertainment committee. Her other musical activities involved being a part of her church's choir since a very early age. Loan Châu fondly talks about this period as one of the most memorable part of her childhood. In 1995, four years after arriving in California, Loan Châu won top honors at a karaoke contest at Ritz night club in Orange County. In 1996, after a meeting with Trúc Hồ, Loan Châu signed an exclusive contract with Asia Entertainment and became one of the organization's many bright young stars. In April 1997, Loan Châu sang in her first gig in Virginia where she was paid for the first time for her singing. In 2000, Loan Châu established her own music label called "Loan Châu Music" and also signed on to sing exclusively for Thúy Nga Productions.

== Solo Album ==
| Album # | Track listing |
|---|---|
| 1st Tình Hồng Cho Anh (1999) | 1. Bên Anh Ngất Ngây (Vietnamese lyrics: Loan Châu); 2. Vẫn Hát Lời Tình Yêu (Dương Thụ); 3. Tình Hồng Cho Anh (Vietnamese lyrics: Loan Châu); 4. Biển Chờ (Bảo Chấn); 5. Bên Trời Hiu Quạnh (Quốc Dũng); 6. Thoáng Như Lời Tình Gọi (Hoàng Trọng Thụy); 7. Cho Rơi Những Bụi Tình (Hoàng Trọng Thụy); 8. Tình Em Sóng Biển (Vietnamese lyrics: Loan Châu); 9. Tôi Với Người Đã Quên (Hoàng Trọng Thụy); 10. Hoa Tím Ngày Xưa (Nhạc: Hữu Xuân, Thơ: Cao Vũ Huy Miên) |
| 2nd Tình Tôi Mới Lớn (2000) | 1. Ai Cho Tôi Tình Yêu; 2. Buồn Trong Ðêm Mưa; 3. Cuộc Tình Vạn Dặm; 4. Tình Yêu Nỗi Nhớ - Hát Với Thế Sơn; 5. Tình Mãi Bơ Vơ; 6. Tình Tôi Mới Lớn; 7. Tình Lá Bay; 8. Tuổi 18; 9. Nhớ Anh Trong Ðêm; 10. Chỉ Yêu Mình Anh |
| 3rd Nụ Hôn Thiết Tha (2000) | 1. Tình Ðầu; 2. Nụ Hôn Thiết Tha; 3. Ðêm Liêu Trai; 4. Quên Người Tình Xa; 5. Khi Biết Yêu; 6. Tóc Mây; 7. Ðêm Hoang Vắng; 8. Cơn Mưa Lao Xao; 9. Ðôi Khi Em Muốn Khóc; 10. Huyền Thoại Người Con Gái |
| 4th Khúc Ca Mùa Xuân (2002) | 1. Khúc Ca Mùa Xuân (Quốc Hùng); 2. Vào Mộng (Vietnamese lyrics: Khúc Lan); 3. Chiều Hôm Ấy (Quốc Hùng); 4. Ước Hẹn (Vietnamese lyrics: Khúc Lan); 5. Tình Bay Theo Gió (Vietnamese lyrics: Khúc Lan); 6. Người Tù Trong Mắt Anh (Lê Xuân Trường); 7. Xin Được Làm Tình Cuối (Quốc Hùng); 8. Màu Nhiệm Tình Yêu (Lê Xuân Trường); 9. Bài Tango Màu Xanh (Song Ngọc); 10. Cười Lên Đi Anh Ơi (Lê Hựu Hà); 11. Mùa Xuân Đã Đến (Composer: Nguyễn Kim Thanh, Vietnamese lyrics: Khúc Lan) |
| 5th Mưa Dĩ Vãng (2004) | 1. Cơn Mơ Hoang Đường; 2. Chia Tay; 3. Tôi Không Tin; 4. Khúc Tình Nồng; 5. Phố Mưa; 6. Dấu Yêu - Hát Với Trần Thái Hòa; 7. Bài Tango Xa Rồi; 8. Mưa Dĩ Vãng; 9. Vẫn Yêu Một Mình; 10. Đừng Hỏi Vì Sao; 11. Ánh Trăng Lẻ Loi; 12. Cà Phê Đắng Trở Lại - Hát Với Don Hồ |
| 6th Anh Hãy Nói (2005) | 1. Hãy Đến Bên Em; 2. Anh Hãy Nói; 3. Ghen Tương; 4. Giọt Đắng Tình Yêu; 5. Giọt Nước Mắt; 6. Lời Hứa Mong Manh; 7. Thầm Yêu; 8. Em Vẫn Chờ Anh; 9. Tình Xót Xa Thôi; 10. Chỉ Là Phù Du; 11. Vai Phụ (Bonus); Bonus VCD : Anh Hãy Nói |
| 7th Khúc Tương Phùng (2006) | 1. Lời Mở Đầu - Loan Châu; 2. Khúc Tương Phùng; 3. Buồn Làm Chi Vì Em; 4. Mộng Dưới Trăng; 5. Em Vẫn Nguyện Cầu Vì Anh; 6. Chợt Nhớ Hơn Bao Giờ; 7. Bên Cầu Ô Thước; 8. Mùa Đông Trắng Mộng Chiều Xuân; 9. Lối Anh Về Không; 10. Em Là Của Riêng Anh; 11. Hai Màu Nắng; 12. Phút Chơi Vơi; 13. Bài Tango Cuối Cùng |
| 8th Mẹ, Quê Hương & Tình Yêu (2007) | 1. Rằng Thì Là (Nguyễn Đình Lợi); 2. Hà Nội Mùa Vắng Những Cơn Mưa (Trương Quý Hải); 3. Nhớ Mưa Sài Gòn (Vĩnh Tâm); 4. Nhớ Ơn Mẹ (Đinh Trung Chính); 5. Đêm Đô Thị ( Y Vân); 6. Nỗi Lòng Người Đi (Anh Bằng); 7. Tình Mẹ (Nguyễn Nhất Huy); 8. Mẹ Ơi Con Đã Biết (Vietnamese lyrics: Kỳ Anh); 9. Mưa Sài Gòn, Nắng Cali (Nguyệt Ánh); Bonus Karaoke: 1. Nhớ Ơn Mẹ; 2. Điều Ước |

== Solo DVD Videos ==
=== Điều Ước (2007) ===
DISC # 1

- Nhạc Phim : Mối Tình Học Trò
- Nói lên một thời tuổi học trò của Loan Châu tại Marie Curie và mối tình đầu ...
1. Rằng Thì Là (Nguyễn Đình Lợi)
2. Lời Quả Tim (Phạm Khải Tuấn)
3. Ánh Sáng Của Đời Tôi (Minh Châu)
4. Lại Gần Hôn Em - duet with Quang Dũng
5. Khúc Tương Phùng (Hoài An)
6. Đôi Khi Em Muốn Khóc (Lời Việt: Lê Xuân Trường)
7. Sa Mạc Tình Yêu
8. Lỡ Một Lần Trú Mưa (Lời Việt: Vũ Xuân Hùng & Kỳ Anh)
9. Nhạc Phim : Bên Cầu Ô Thước (Hoài An)

DISC # 2

1. Telephone - Duet with Don Ho
2. Chỉ Còn Mình Em (Huỳnh Nhật Tân)
3. Đợi Chờ (Lời Việt: Khúc Lan)
4. Chia Tay (Phạm Khải Tuấn)
5. Tình Dẫu Đắng Cây (Huỳnh Nhật Tân)
6. Em Vẫn Nguyện Cầu Vì Anh (Hoài An)
7. Nhạc Phim: Nhớ Ơn Mẹ (Đinh Trung Chính)
8. Điều Ước (Phạm Khải Tuấn)
- Chủ đề của DVD, nói lên những ước mơ của Loan Châu gỏi đến tất cả ....
- Behind The Scene

== Music Productions ==
- Asia Entertainment (1996–1999, 2017)
- Thúy Nga (2000–2007, 2019)
- Tình (2007-2011)
- Loan Châu Music (2000 - current)
