= Ý Lan =

Vietnamese singer

- Born: January 1, 1958 (age 68); Saigon, South Vietnam
- Occupation: Singer
- Labels: Asia Thúy Nga Mây

Lê Thị Ý Lan is a Vietnamese-American female singer. She was born on January 1, 1958, in Saigon, in an artistic-traditioned family. Her mother was the singer Thái Thanh.

== Discography ==
=== Overseas ===
- DVD The Best of Ý Lan from Paris By Night (Thúy Nga, 2010)
- DVD The Best of MTV Music Vũ Khanh – Ý Lan (Diễm xưa, 2004)
- CD Hát Để Cho Đời – with Quang Tuấn (Ý Lan Productions, 2008)
- CD Tình Ca Phạm Duy – Đừng Lay Tôi Nhé Cuộc Đời (Ý Lan Productions, 2007)
- CD Hỏi Tình (Ý Lan Productions, 2006)
- CD Muốn Hỏi Tại Sao (Ý Lan Productions, 2006)
- CD Tình Ca Lam Phương – Tình Ca Không Đoạn Kết (Ý Lan Productions, 2004)
- CD Lời Rêu (Thúy Nga, 2004)
- CD Một Ngày Như Mọi Ngày (Ý Lan Productions, 2003)
- CD Tình Ca Đức Huy – Ru Em Tiếc Nuối (Ý Lan Productions, 2002)
- CD Em Còn Nhớ Hay Em Đã Quên – với Lan Anh (Ý Lan Productions, 2001)
- CD Khi Tôi Về (Ý Lan Productions, 2000)
- CD Mê Khúc (Ý Lan Productions, 2000)
- CD Ru Từng Nỗi Nhớ (Ý Lan Productions, 2000)
- CD Yêu, La Vie En Rose (Ý Lan Productions, 2000)

=== In Vietnam ===
- CD Tuyệt Tình (2013)
- CD Vẫn Có Anh Bên Đời (2013)
- CD Cô Bắc Kỳ Nho Nhỏ (2013)
- CD Một Mình (2013)
- CD Như Đã Dấu Yêu (2013)
