= Paris by Night =

Series of Vietnamese-language musical variety shows

- VHS cover of first show
- Genre: Variety show
- Created by: Tô Văn Lai
- Presented by: Nguyễn Ngọc Ngạn; Nguyễn Cao Kỳ Duyên
- Countries of origin: France; United States; Canada; Thailand; Singapore; South Korea
- Original languages: Vietnamese; English (occasionally); French (occasionally)
- No. of episodes: 138 (list of episodes)

Production
- Executive producers: Marie Tô; Paul Huỳnh
- Producer: John Nguyen (coordinator)
- Production location: (see Venues section of article)
- Running time: Originally up to two hours, now up to five hours
- Production company: Thúy Nga

Original release
- Release: 1983 – present

Paris by Night (commonly abbreviated as PBN) is a direct-to-video series featuring Vietnamese-language musical variety shows produced by Thúy Nga Productions. Hosted mainly by Nguyễn Ngọc Ngạn and Nguyễn Cao Kỳ Duyên, the series includes musical performances by modern pop stars, traditional folk songs, one-act plays, and sketch comedy.

== Background ==
Paris by Night was conceived by an immigrant, Tô Văn Lai in 1983, in Paris, France, to "fill the cultural void" felt by Vietnamese refugees living in France. Shortly afterwards, the show's production company transferred to Orange County, California, USA which has a larger Vietnamese community.

== Themes ==
The show is set up with "melodramatic performances, catchy pop tunes, Vaudeville-esque comedy, and elaborate set designs", with a large emphasis of production focusing on expressing Vietnamese culture. In recent years, the rising popularity of K-pop and J-pop has applied creative pressure to Thúy Nga CEO Marie Tô, who responded by insisting on keeping with the Vietnamese style, commenting "Of course, K-pop is very big now…but we kind of want to create our own image. The singer[s] we produce, we want to create their image—not imitating K-pop or anything." The show has since been noted as not only a form of entertainment, but a "way to connect to a larger identity".

== Production ==
=== Crew ===
While most of the staff and crew remain the same from show to show, the directors may vary based on the filming location. Richard Valverde served as director for shows in Paris, Michael Watt directed shows in Canada and the United States, and Victor Fable directed in the United States. Notable directors include The Voice's Alan Carter, who directed six shows in the United States, CEO of production company A. Smith & Co. Kent Weed, of six shows in the United States, and NBC director Ron de Moraes, who directed five shows.

PBN Show Directors
Director	PBN Shows Directed
Jean Pierre Barry	10 - 15
Richard Valverde	17 - 37; 53 - 54; 60 - 62; 65 - 66; 69 - 70; 134; 136
Pascal Cresegut	16; 23
Michael Watt	38 - 50; 56; 58 - 59; 72 - 87; 91
Lưu Huỳnh	49
Đinh Anh Dũng	49
Christian Oshea	52
Kent Weed	57; 63 - 64; 67 - 68; 71;
Danielle Phương Thảo	59
Alan Carter	88; 90; 92 - 99; Divas; 100 - 106; 108; 111; 120; 123; 129
Seounghyun Oh	89
Ron de Moraes	107; 109 - 110; 112; 114 - 119; 124; 126 - 128
Ken Nguyễn	PBN VIP Parties; 113; 121 - 122; Divos; Gloria 1 - 3; 125; 131; 135; 138
Manuel Bonilla	130; 132 - 133; 137

Starting with Paris by Night 34: Made in Paris, Shanda Sawyer worked as the production's main choreographer.

=== Filming ===
Originally, Paris by Night was filmed exclusively in Paris, with its intended target audience consisting of the Vietnamese population in France. However, by the late 1980s, the production moved to Orange County, California following demand from the more populous Vietnamese American community for the production to host shows in the United States and the fact that most Vietnamese language performers from the former South Vietnam lived in the country, with filming beginning in the country in the mid-1990s.

Except for a few tapings, Paris by Night is filmed live before an audience. The show has since been filmed in France, the United States, Canada, South Korea, Singapore, and Thailand. It has never been filmed in its native country, Vietnam, due to potential censorship and administrative procedures.

=== Video release ===
Since the beginning of the show's run, the producers have been releasing videos of the shows on VHS and, more recently, DVD. Since the digital age, however, Paris by Night sales have dropped significantly, and the company has since switched to a video on demand service and subscription services similar to Netflix. Full shows and music clips have been made on the official Thúy Nga YouTube channel, supported with ad revenue. The company has also allowed IP addresses in Vietnam to stream shows for free, countering the country's ban on the show's sales. Production coordinator John Nguyen states “All the copies in Vietnam are bootleg or through illegal downloads."

== Accolades ==
List of nominations and awards received by Paris by Night
Year	Award	Category	Result
2003	American Choreography Award	Television Special, Episodic and Variety Show	Nominated

== Venues ==
List of venues and locations where Paris by Night was held and filmed
Venue	City	State/Region/Province	Country	PBN Shows Produced
Taratata Studio, France	Paris	Île-de-France	France	PBN 01 - 23, 25 - 28, 30, 31, 33 - 35, 48, 51, 53, 54, 60, 61, 65 & 66
Cerritos Center for The Performing Arts	Cerritos	California	United States	PBN 24
Caesars Palace	Paradise	Nevada	United States	PBN 29 & 37
Shrine Auditorium	Los Angeles	California	United States	PBN 32
Houston Music Hall	Houston	Texas	United States	PBN 36
CBC Studio 40, Canadian Broadcasting Centre	Toronto	Ontario	Canada	PBN 38, 39, 41, 43 - 45, 47, 49, 56, 58, 59, 72, 74, 76, 78, 80, 82, 85
John Bassett Theatre, Metro Toronto Convention Centre	Toronto	Ontario	Canada	PBN 42, 50
Terrace Theatre, Long Beach Performing Arts & Convention Center	Long Beach	California	United States	PBN 46, 52, 57, 73, 77, 81, 90, 91, 94, 95
Théâtre de l'Empire	Paris	Île-de-France	France	PBN 62
Charles M. Schulz Theater, Knott's Berry Farm	Buena Park	California	United States	PBN 63, 64, 68, 83, 86, 87, 92, 93, 96, 97, 99, 102 & 103
San Jose Center for the Performing Arts	San Jose	California	United States	PBN 67, 71, 75 & 79
Studio Carrere	Paris	Île-de-France	France	PBN 69 & 70
Atlanta Civic Center	Atlanta	Georgia	United States	PBN 84
Hobby Center for the Performing Arts	Houston	Texas	United States	PBN 88
Olympic Fencing Gymnasium, Seoul Olympic Park	Seoul	Seoul Capital Area	South Korea	PBN 89
Zappos Theater, Planet Hollywood Las Vegas	Paradise	Nevada	United States	PBN 98, 100, 104, 106, 109, 111, 115, 123, 128 & 129, 133
Pechanga Showroom Theater, Pechanga Resort & Casino	Temecula	California	United States	PBN 101, 107, 110, 112, 114, 116 - 119, 121, 122, 124, 127, 132, 135, 137, 138
MGM Grand Theater, Foxwoods Resort Casino	Ledyard	Connecticut	United States	PBN 105, 108
Saigon Performing Arts Center	Fountain Valley	California	United States	PBN 113, 125
Choctaw Casino & Resort	Durant	Oklahoma	United States	PBN 120
Mystic Lake Casino	Prior Lake	Minnesota	United States	PBN 126
Resorts World Sentosa	Sentosa		Singapore	PBN 130
Premiere Studio	Fountain Valley	California	United States	PBN 131
Royal Paragon Hall, Siam Paragon	Bangkok		Thailand	PBN 134, 136

== Demographics ==
When first produced in the 1980s, the show was made for Vietnamese people who had been living in France in the 1960s and 1970s. However, the show found a larger audience in the United States by the late 1980s. As a result of the digital age of the 21st century, the show has become more readily accessible online. According to Thúy Nga, the main demographic of the shows consisted of people under the age of 40. Presenter Nguyễn Cao Kỳ Duyên commented on the show's popularity in Vietnam, noting "We actually give the Vietnamese audience in Vietnam a very high level of entertainment unmatched by what they have now."

== Controversies ==
As an overseas Vietnamese production and classified as a "reactionary cultural product" by the Vietnamese government, Paris by Night has not been authorised to be legally purchased in Vietnam, although unauthorised copies can be easily obtained on the black market. It sometimes features performances that are related to historical events, critical of the ruling Vietnamese Communist Party. Even though Thúy Nga has never held any events in Vietnam, many artists from the company have returned to Vietnam to perform and participate in concerts and television shows, as the Vietnamese music industry develops.

In 2004, in Paris by Night 74, Hoang Oanh sang a song about Operation Passage to Freedom and a video montage was shown depicting beleaguered-looking northern Vietnamese fleeing to the anti-communist south during the partition of Vietnam, where they were met by Ngô Đình Diệm and his government's officials. This performance coincided with the 50th anniversary of the migration. In 2005, Paris by Night 77 was devoted to the 30th anniversary of the Fall of Saigon, and included songs explicitly critical of communist rule, lack of human rights, accompanied by montages of the closing stages of the Ho Chi Minh Campaign, the flight of distressed anti-communist refugees, and interpretative dancing critical of VCP rule, such as throat-slitting gestures. It also included documentary segments on the progress of Vietnamese immigrant communities since 1975, including one segment praising American support for South Vietnam and Operation Babylift—the communist government views the babylift of orphans as "abduction"—and gave awards to Vietnamese humanitarians and American political officials who helped Vietnamese refugees, as well as the Republic of Vietnam Air Force fighter pilot Nguyễn Qúy An.

In Paris by Night 91, for the 40th anniversary of the Tet Offensive, one medley involved Quang Lê singing about the beauty of the former Huế, backed by female dancers, before an explosion knocks them and the bridge over the Perfume River to the ground, something perpetrated by the communists during the Battle of Huế during the Tet Offensive. Khánh Ly then proceeded to sing Trịnh Công Sơn's "Song for dead bodies" about the communist massacre at Huế, which killed thousands. A video montage of the massacre, inconsolable relatives and the subsequent exhumation and religious reburial was shown in the background during Khanh Ly's performance. The Vietnamese government and media outlets have criticised these programs for including content that is anti-communism and sensitive to Vietnam's history. Furthermore, all DVD copies of PBN 77 and 91 were ordered to be destroyed and forbidden from sales and distribution.

It is also the subject of some controversies among the overseas Vietnamese population due to what some perceive as its support of the current government of Vietnam. Paris by Night 40, with the topic of motherhood, featured a song by the composer Trịnh Công Sơn titled "Ca Dao Mẹ", which was performed by Don Hồ. The song included a reenactment of a bombing during the Vietnam War and showed a mother grieving over the death of her child and her husband. Some were offended by the song's antiwar message while others see this as an indictment against American and South Vietnamese troops even though the scene did not make it clear which side was doing the bombing. After a boycott, Thúy Nga reissued Paris by Night 40 with the bombing scenes removed. Paris by Night 40 is the most commercially successful production. The director of the segment, Lưu Huỳnh, later went on to direct The White Silk Dress in Vietnam, a film with similar themes.

In 2015, Vietnam Television was criticized for including a scene where Vietnamese singer Thu Phương performed in Paris by Night to introduce her as a judge and mentor in The Voice of Vietnam 2015 as the program was never authorized to be aired in Vietnam. In 2018, a protest occurred in Little Saigon, Westminster, California, U.S., organized by anti-communist Vietnamese community against Thuy Nga and Paris by Night program for cooperating with television and media companies in Vietnam.

== Performers ==
All Vietnamese artists on these lists are either Vietnamese nationals, citizens, non-citizens (holding citizenship of another country), or dual citizens of Vietnam and another country. Not all of these artists are recurring performers of Paris by Night.

=== Vietnamese male ===
- Bằng Kiều
- Don Hồ
- Dương Triệu Vũ
- Lâm Nhật Tiến
- Luong Tung Quang
- Nguyễn Ngọc Ngạn
- Quang Lê
- Roni Trọng
- Thanh Bùi
- Tommy Ngô
- Tuấn Ngọc
- Trường Vũ
- Mạnh Quỳnh
- Trần Thái Hòa
- Nguyễn Hưng
- Trịnh Lam
- Mai Tiến Dũng
- Đan Nguyễn
- Hoài Lâm
- Ngọc Ngữ
- Tuấn Vũ
- Tuấn Phước

=== Vietnamese female ===
- Ái Vân
- Ánh Minh
- Diễm Liên
- Hồ Lệ Thu
- Hương Lan
- Hương Thủy
- Khánh Ly
- Lâm Thúy Vân
- Lynda Trang Đài
- Loan Châu
- Minh Tuyết
- Nguyễn Cao Kỳ Duyên
- Như Loan
- Như Quỳnh
- Tâm Đoan
- Thanh Hà
- Thủy Tiên
- Tóc Tiên
- Trần Thu Hà
- Mai Thiên Vân
- Quỳnh Vi
- Hạ Vy
- Diễm Sương
- Như Ý
- Myra Trần
- Hoàng Mỹ An
- Hoàng Nhung
- Châu Ngọc Hà
- Phương Yến Linh
- Hoàng Oanh
- Thanh Tuyền
- Phương Hồng Quế

=== International ===
==== Germany ====
- Boney M — Paris by Night 34

==== South Korea ====
These artists have performed in Paris by Night 81.

- Im Tae-kyung
- Jeon Hye-bin
- Kim Jong-kook
