= Tuấn Ngọc =

Vietnamese singer

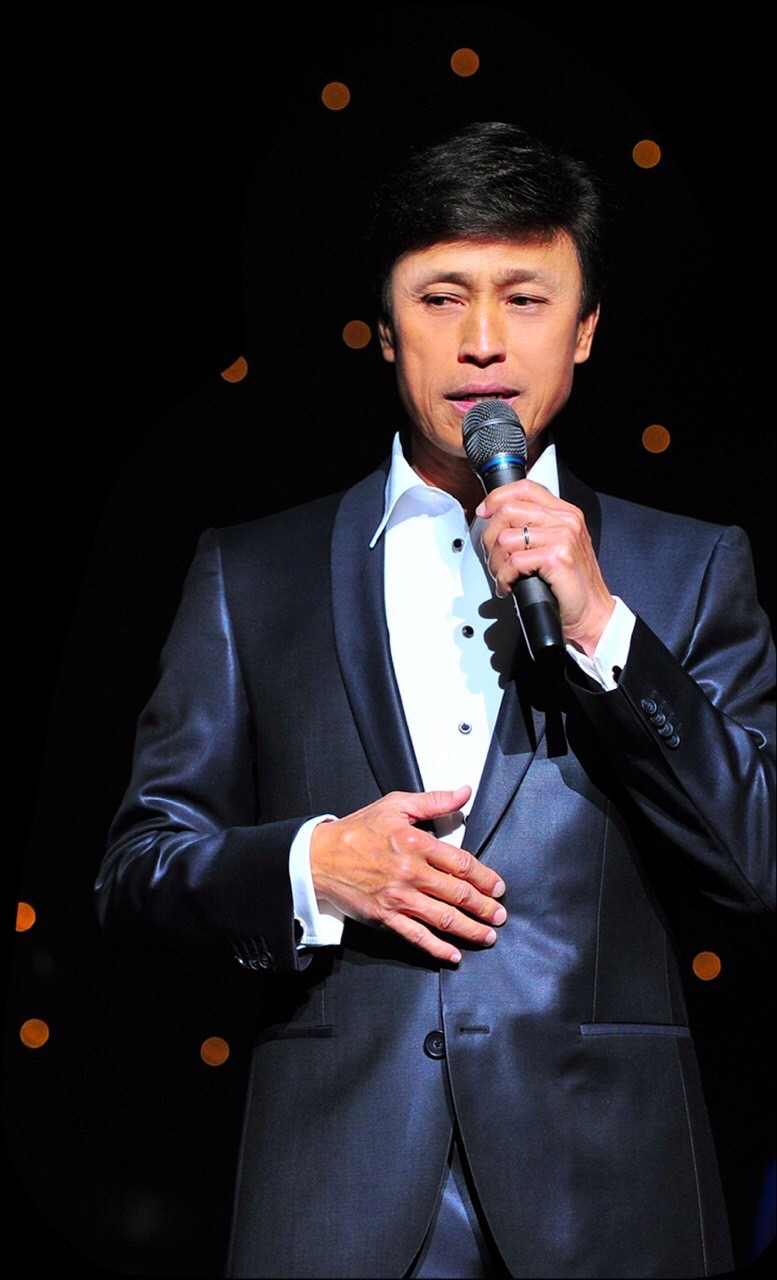
- Tuấn Ngọc, Circa 2013

Background information
- Born: Lữ Anh Tuấn; 4 October 1947 (age 79); Da Lat, Lâm Đồng, French Indochina
- Genres: Nhạc tiền chiến, Nhạc hải ngoại
- Occupations: Singer, composer, guitarist
- Instrument: Singing
- Years active: 1950-present
- Label: Phương Nam Film
- Spouse: Thái Thảo (m. 1994; div. 2025)

Lữ Anh Tuấn (born 4 October 1947) stage name Tuấn Ngọc is a Vietnamese singer. His first album appeared in 1990 and over the following 20 years, he has released 20 more albums, becoming one of the most recognised singers on Vietnamese TV.

== Biography ==
Tuấn Ngọc was born in Da Lat, State of Vietnam; in a family of artists. His siblings are all well-known singers in Vietnam during the 1990s, including singer Khánh Hà (1952). He start singing at the age of 4, when he sang in children's radio programs. At the age of 13, he followed older artists to sing at American clubs during its sparse period in Saigon.

By the end of 1960s, when the movement of young music flourished, Tuấn Ngọc began performing English songs, from which he gained popularity. By the early 1970s, he participated in the two biggest bands at that time, The Strawberry Four and The Top Five.

After 1975, Tuấn Ngọc left his home country and settled in Southern California. Some time later he moved to Hawai'i and performed for many clubs and hotels here. By the mid-1980s he returned to California and began to succeed. In 1994, he married oversea singer Thái Thảo.

Tuấn Ngọc is famous for his lyrical songs. Throughout his career, he has gained appreciation from the professionals as well as the admiration of the music-loving public Trịnh Công Sơn considers Tuấn Ngọc as the best male vocalist among artists singing his songs. In the 2000s, he is considered by many people as a "monumental" male vocalist of Vietnamese new music. Many singers from later generations have cited him as an influence, including Quang Dũng, Trần Thái Hòa.

He recently returned to Vietnam to perform periodically and recorded two albums: "Hãy Yêu Nhau Đi 2" and "Chiều nay không có em". His first official concert took place in early April 2006 at Sheraton Saigon Hotel with about 500 audiences. In 2013, his liveshow In the Spotlight Program No. 1: Private Corner took place over three nights at Hanoi Opera House.

In 2019, he became a coach in The Voice of Vietnam.

== Discography ==
- Lời Gọi Chân Mây (Diễm Xưa), 1989
- Chuyện tình buồn (Làng Văn CD 15), 1990
- Thương ai (Mai Productions), 1992, with Ý Lan
- Môi nào hãy còn thơm (Diễm xưa CD 57), 1993, with Trịnh Vĩnh Trinh
- Giọt lệ cho ngàn sau, a collection of love songs by Từ Công Phụng (1994)
- Ngày đó chúng mình / Tình ca Phạm Duy (Khánh Hà CD 21), with Khánh Hà
- Em ngủ trong một mùa đông (Diễm xưa CD 62), a collection of love songs by Đăng Khánh
- Rong rêu
- Mưa trên vùng tóc rối, 1999, a collection of love songs by Lê Xuân Trường
- Lối về (Bích Thu Vân CD 1), with Cẩm Vân
- Em đi như chiều đi (Bích Thu Vân CD 2)
- Đừng bỏ em một mình (Bích Thu Vân CD 3), with Ý Lan
- Đêm thấy ta là thác đổ (Bích Thu Vân CD 4), 15 love songs by Trịnh Công Sơn
- Lá đổ muôn chiều
- Phôi pha
- Riêng một góc trời
- Tâm sự gởi về đâu
- Hoài cảm, with Thái Hiền
- Tình yêu, with Thanh Hà
- Đi giữa mọi người để nhớ một người, 2001
- Dù nghìn năm qua đi
- Bến lỡ, với Ý Lan, a collection of love songs by Hoàng Ngọc Ẩn
- Lời yêu thương, with Ý Lan
- Sao đổi ngôi, 2002, tình khúc Bảo Trường, with Ý Lan
- Collection Và tôi mãi yêu em – Trên bờ môi dấu yêu (Asia CD 172 : The best of Tuấn Ngọc, 4 CD), 2002
- Hãy yêu nhau đi Vol. 2, 2005
- Tình cuốn mây ngàn, 2005, with Quang Dũng
- Chiều nay không có em
- Riêng Một Góc Trời, TNCD611 (2019)
