= Thanh Hà (singer) =

Vietnamese singer (born 1969)

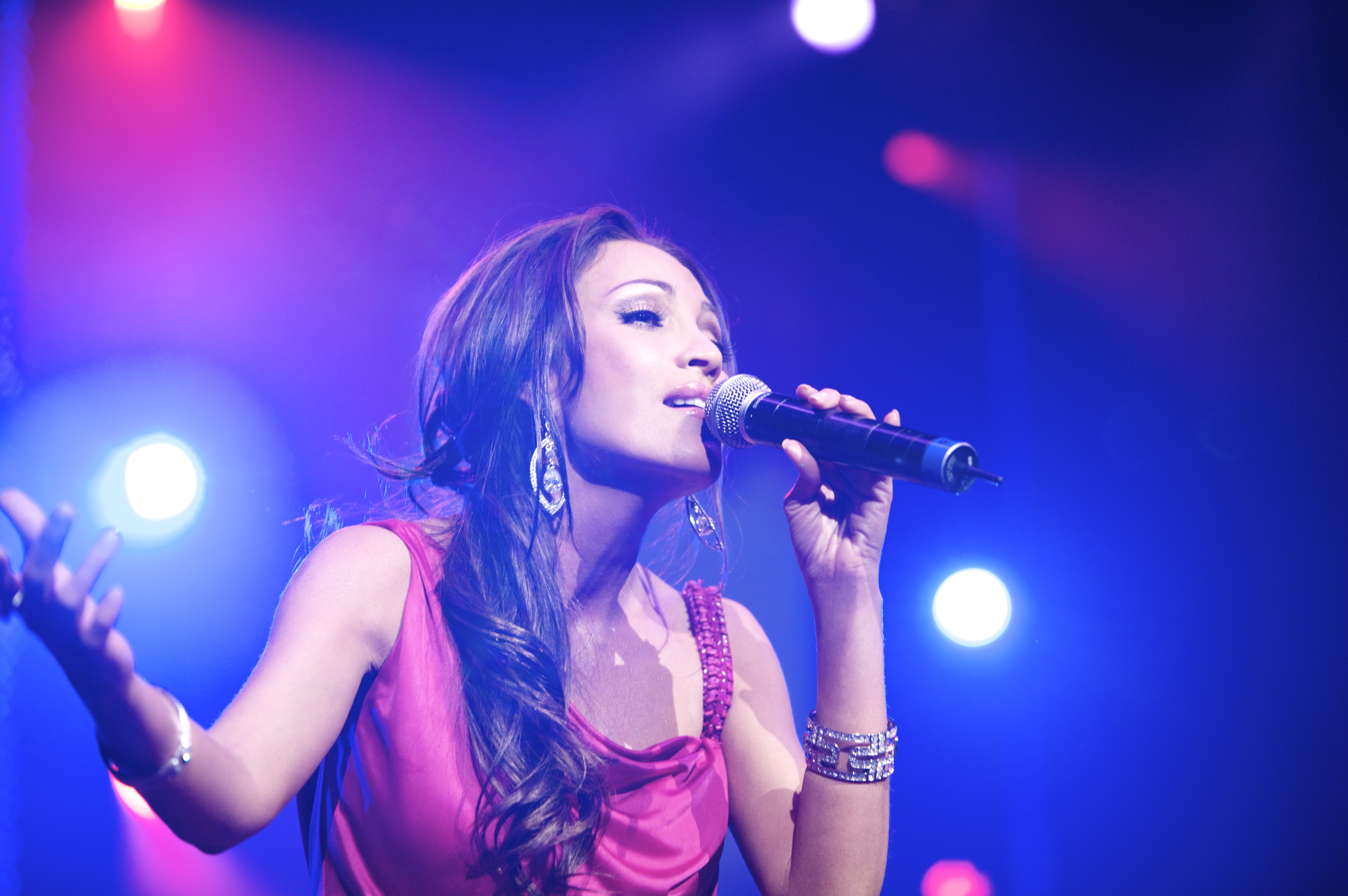
- Thanh Hà performing at the Mohegan Sun, Connecticut
- Born: Trương Minh Hà; 1969; Đà Nẵng, South Vietnam
- Occupation: Singer
- Years active: 1996–
- Musical career
- Genre: Pop
- Instrument: Vocals
- Label: Thúy Nga

Trương Minh Hà (born in Đà Nẵng, South Vietnam), known under the stage name of Thanh Hà, is a Vietnamese American singer.

Thanh Hà‘s mother is Vietnamese. Her father was Bill Williams, a German-American U.S soldier, who died at Chu Lai when she was two years old, during the Vietnam War. She went to school in Đà Nẵng, and as a child she sung on Đà Nẵng radio. After graduating from high school, she moved to Ho Chi Minh City. In 1991 she escaped Vietnam by boat to a Vietnamese refugee camp in the Philippines. During a beauty contest in the refugee camp in the Philippines, she sang for the first time in front of an audience, for the talent part of the competition. She won a $150 prize, and was surprised to discover that many people liked her voice. She later immigrated to America under the Vietnamese Amerasian American Homecoming Act. She and female singer and music producer Phương Uyên got married in California on September 15, 2022.
