= Ái Vân =

Vietnamese singer

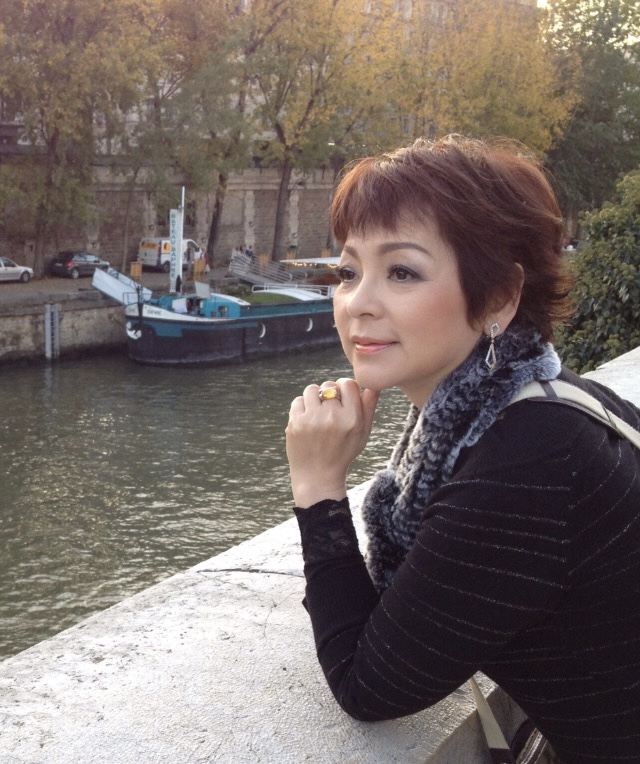
- Ái Vân in 2013

Background information
- Born: Hà Ái Vân; October 30, 1954 (age 72); Hanoi, North Vietnam
- Occupations: Singer; Recording artist
- Instrument: Vocal
- Formerly of: Trần Bình (m. 1982; div. 1990)

Ai Van (born October 30, 1954) is a Vietnamese singer.
