= Nguyễn Cao Kỳ Duyên (entertainer) =

American singer-songwriter

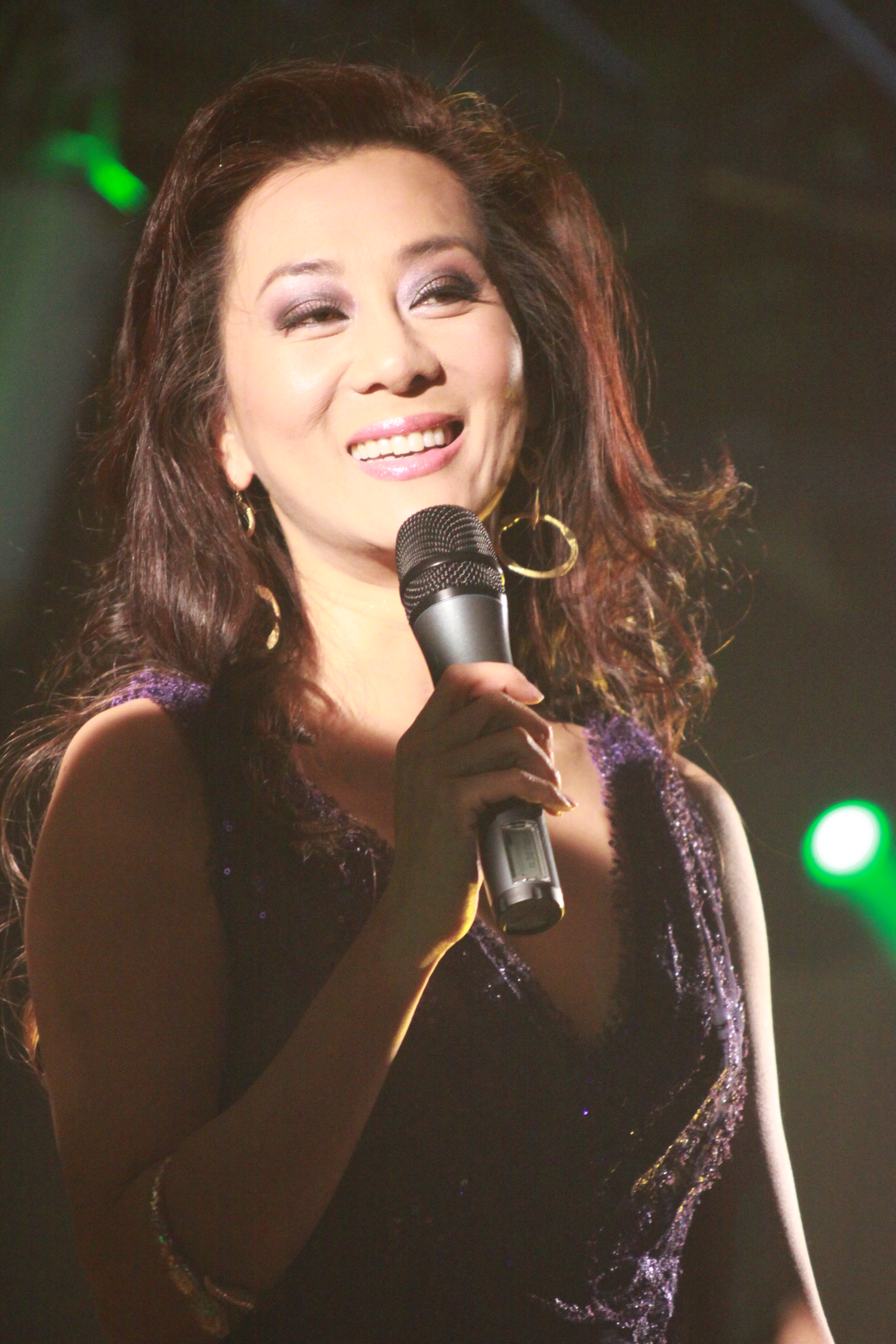
- Born: Nguyễn Cao Kỳ Duyên; June 30, 1965 (age 61); Saigon, South Vietnam
- Other name: Jennifer Nguyễn
- Education: California State Polytechnic University, Pomona (BS); Western State College of Law (JD)
- Occupations: Singer, songwriter, master of ceremonies

Nguyễn Cao Kỳ Duyên ( (born June 30, 1965) is a Vietnamese-American singer, songwriter, and master of ceremonies and co-host of Paris by Night.

== Early life and education ==
Kỳ Duyên was born on June 30, 1965, in Saigon, South Vietnam as the only daughter to Nguyễn Cao Kỳ, a former South Vietnamese Prime Minister, Vice President, and Air-Force General. Her father was from Sơn Tây and grew up in Hanoi. Her mother is Đặng Tuyết Mai who was from Bắc Ninh and also spent most of her childhood in Hanoi. Because of her parents' roots in Northern Vietnam, Kỳ Duyên speaks Vietnamese with a distinct Northern accent, despite growing up in the South. At around the age of ten during the Fall of Saigon on April 30, 1975, Nguyễn Cao Kỳ Duyên moved to the United States.

When first moving to America, Nguyễn Cao Kỳ Duyên lived in Fairfax, Virginia, then later moved to Huntington Beach, California in which she studied at Marina High School. She enrolled for a law major at Western State College of Law at Argosy University and graduated with honors.

She learned piano since age 5. During the time when she was 13 to 19 years old, she learned music theory and vocal training. Her debut appearance was to host at Miss Ao Dai Competition in Long Beach, California. In 1984, she recorded her first music CD at Tung Giang Studio. In 1985, she debuted as a singer in Seattle, Washington, but her first recording was in 1993 for Hollywood Night Center. She often performs at Las Vegas, California and Paris.

Kỳ Duyên is currently a master of ceremonies for Thúy Nga Productions's Paris by Night series alongside Nguyễn Ngọc Ngạn. Kỳ Duyên has shared that when she first began her career as an MC, she did not read and write in Vietnamese, so her mother helped her memorize her lines.

== Education ==
Kỳ Duyên went to school in Fairfax, Virginia during her childhood, moving to Huntington Beach, California in her high school years, and graduating from Westminster High School in Westminster, California.

She received her Bachelor of Undergraduate Education degree at California State Polytechnic University, and later obtained her Graduate Law master's degree with Honors from Western State University College of Law.

== Personal life ==
Her first marriage was to Nguyễn Quang Li, a surgeon, then Trịnh Hội, a lawyer (whom she divorced in 2008). She has been married twice and divorced twice. She currently resides in Huntington Beach, California with her two daughters from her first marriage.

== Filmography ==
=== Film ===
Year	Title	Role	Notes
2016	Nữ Đại Gia	Kim Anh	Marketed as The Rich Woman in English
TBA	A Lone Lost Soul	Minh Tam	Short; Post-production

=== Television ===
Year	Title	Role	Notes
2024	The Sympathizer	Madame	Main role; 6 episodes
