= Nguyễn Ngọc Ngạn =

Vietnamese-Canadian writer, essayist and television personality

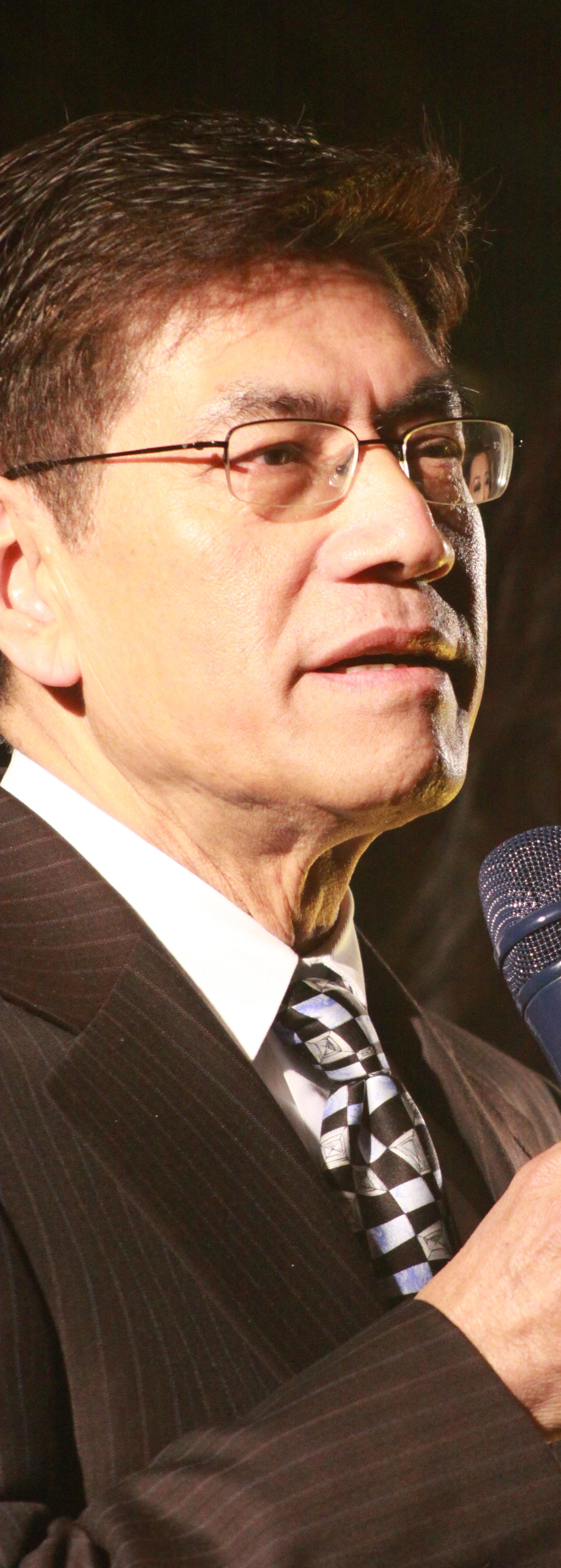
- Ngạn in Europe, 2008
- Born: Nguyễn Ngọc Ngạn; 9 March 1945 (age 81); Phúc Thọ, Sơn Tây, Tonkin, French Indochina
- Citizenship: Canada
- Education: Nguyễn Bá Tòng School; Chu Văn An High School; Conservatory of Ho Chi Minh City
- Alma mater: The University of Saigon, South Vietnam
- Occupations: Writer; Teacher; MC
- Spouse(s): Lê Thị Tuyết Lan (1970–1978); Trần Ngọc Diệp (1982–present)
- Children: Two sons
- Relatives: Nguyễn Ngọc Trọng (younger brother)
- Writing career
- Years active: 1979–2022
- Genres: Short story, novel, drama
- Notable work: The Will Of Heaven
- Military career
- Allegiance: South Vietnam
- Branch: Army of the Republic of Vietnam; South Vietnamese Regional Forces
- Service years: 1970–1975
- Unit: 9th Division
- Conflicts: Vietnam War

Nguyễn Ngọc Ngạn (born 9 March 1945 in Sơn Tây) is a Vietnamese-Canadian writer, essayist, former playwright and Master of Ceremonies.

Ngạn was born in Sơn Tây (present-day Hanoi), but his family moved to South Vietnam when the Geneva Accords divided Vietnam in 1954. After university and service in the Army of the Republic of Vietnam, Ngạn was imprisoned by the victorious communists after the fall of Saigon in 1975 and did forced labour in a re-education camp up until 1978, an experience described in his autobiography, The Will Of Heaven.

After his release, Ngạn escaped by boat to Malaysia in 1979. During the closing stages of the journey, storms hit the boat and knocked it over within sight of land. Ngạn's wife and child drowned and he was pulled unconscious from the water. He was sponsored by the Canadian government and brought to Vancouver in 1980, moving to Prince Rupert, British Columbia, and in 1985 to Toronto.

Ngạn was formerly known for co-hosting Thuy Nga's Paris by Night with Vietnamese personality Kỳ Duyên until his retirement in 2022. He co-authored Ballad Of Mulan and The Blind Man and the Cripple – Orchard Village.

== Sources ==
- Nguyễn Ngọc Ngạn with E.E. Richey, The Will of Heaven: A Story of One Vietnamese and the End of His World, Dutton, 1982: ISBN 0-525-03061-1
