= Thúy Nga Productions =

American entertainment company

Thúy Nga, Inc.
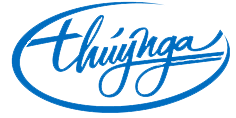
- Company logo used since 2011
- Type: Private
- Industry: Entertainment
- Genre: Folk; V-pop
- Founded: 1972, Saigon, South Vietnam; 1983, Paris, France
- Founder: Tô Văn Lai
- Headquarters: 14882 Moran St, Westminster, California 92863, U.S.
- Area served: United States; Canada; France; Australia
- Key people: Tô Văn Lai (Chairman, Deceased); Marie Tô Ngọc Thủy (President/CEO)
- Products: Music; variety shows; film; magazines; audiobooks; posters; calendars; radio; television
- Divisions: Thúy Nga Productions; Thúy Nga Music
- Website: thuynga.com

Thúy Nga Inc. (dba Thúy Nga Productions, variously referred to as Thúy Nga Incorporated, Thúy Nga Paris, and Trung Tâm Thúy Nga) is an American entertainment company founded in 1984 in Paris, and currently based in Westminster, California. The private company is known for its Vietnamese-oriented entertainment, such as the variety show and direct-to-video series Paris by Night, and music released as part of the record label Thúy Nga Music.

== History ==
=== 1963–2000: Background and founding ===
Founder Tô Văn Lai first formed a music company in 1963, in Saigon, South Vietnam, as a precursor for the current company and record label, their first store was located at the Crystal Palace (Thương xá Tam Đa), which was later known as International Trading Center (ITC) and burned down in 2002. After the Fall of Saigon, the company had to stop operating for a period of time.

Tô began operations for Thúy Nga in 1984, in Paris, France, starting with production for the show Paris by Night. Afterwards, the company transferred to Orange County, California, which has one of the largest Vietnamese populations outside of Vietnam. The company has since produced more shows in the series, along with other videos, and a catalog of albums by various artists from the Thúy Nga Music record label.

=== 2000–present: Global spread and digital piracy issues ===
In the 21st century, Thuy Nga Productions has held Paris by Night programs and joint concerts around the world beyond France and the United States, in Canada, Finland, Germany, South Korea, Thailand, Singapore, and Australia, attracting Vietnamese audiences, both from the native country of Vietnam, and residents and/or citizens in these countries respectively.

Over time, Thuy Nga Productions began to lose revenue due to the piracy of the video and album releases, with chief executive Marie To commenting, "Profit? We are barely making it." Works released by the company are also banned in Vietnam, which has the largest source of pirates.

Due to the rampant online piracy, Vietnamese entertainment companies have ceased productions, with exceptions being Thúy Nga, Garden Grove-based Asia Entertainment, and Vân Sơn. In 2008, Marie To commented, "Ten years ago, there were about two dozen music studios; now only three labels are active." In 2010, Thúy Nga nearly shut down, but narrowly avoided it due to community support and new business strategies, which included lowering the cost to perform at venues and increasing advertising.

The company has since moved to social media by 2010, posting videos of Paris by Night performances and full albums on YouTube along with advertising, to attract audiences to purchase the label's works.

== Organization ==
Although production for the company's products includes various freelance workers, producers, directors, and such, the full-time staff is limited to about a dozen people. Many singers for the company have originated in Orange County.

In addition to its headquarters at Westminster, California, and its original headquarters in Paris, Thúy Nga also has regional sales and distribution centers in Toronto, Canada, and in Bankstown, New South Wales, Australia. The company also transferred part of its Australian distribution rights to a local music center at Footscray, Victoria.

== Associated labels ==
- N-Q Records (1996–1999)
- Như Quỳnh Entertainment (1998–present)

== Artists ==
These artists have released albums (billed as a main artist) under the main Thúy Nga Music label.

- Ái Vân
- Ánh Minh
- Bằng Kiều
- Don Hồ
- Dương Triệu Vũ
- Hồ Lệ Thu
- Hương Lan
- Hương Thủy
- Lam Anh
- Lynda Trang Đài
- Loan Châu
- Minh Tuyết
- Nguyễn Cao Kỳ Duyên
- Như Loan
- Như Quỳnh
- Phi Nhung
- Quang Lê
- Tâm Đoan
- Thanh Hà
- Thế Sơn
- Thủy Tiên
- Tóc Tiên
- Tommy Ngô
- Trần Thu Hà
- Ngọc Ngữ
