= Paris by Night 96 =

Paris By Night 96
- Paris by Night episode
- PBN 96 DVD Cover
- Episode no.: Episode 96
- Directed by: Alan Carter
- Masters of ceremonies: Nguyễn Ngọc Ngạn; Nguyễn Cao Kỳ Duyên
- Filmed at: Knott's Berry Farm, California
- Filmed on: April 18, 2009 and April 19, 2009
- Venue: Charles M. Schulz Theater
- Executive producers: Marie Tô; Paul Huỳnh
- Format: 2-Disc DVD
- Release date: June 25, 2009

Paris By Night 96 - Nhạc Yêu Cầu 2 (Music Requests 2) is a Paris By Night program produced by Thúy Nga that was filmed at the Knott's Berry Farm on April 18, 2009 and April 19, 2009 and released DVD from June 25, 2009. The show was MC'ed by Nguyễn Ngọc Ngạn and Nguyễn Cao Kỳ Duyên.

== Trivia ==
The program is the 2nd part of the Nhạc Yêu Cầu series.

== Track list ==
=== Disc 1 ===
01. Phần Mở Đầu (Intro)

02. Liên Khúc Paris By Night Top Hits:

1. Một Kiếp Phong Ba (Lời Việt: Nhật Ngân) – Bảo Hân (performance from Paris By Night 34: Made In Paris)
2. Làm Sao Quên Được Em © (Quốc Tuấn) – Lương Tùng Quang (performance from Paris By Night 69: Nợ Tình)
3. Em Vẫn Tin (Lời Việt: Hồ Lệ Thu) – Hồ Lệ Thu (performance from Paris By Night 89: In Korea)
4. Tại Sao © (Trịnh Lam) – Trịnh Lam (performance from Paris By Night 86: PBN Talent Show – Semi-Finals)
5. Tình Chấp Nhận (Trần Đức) – Quỳnh Vi (performance from Paris By Night 89: In Korea)
6. Em Ở Đâu? © (Chí Tài) – Dương Triệu Vũ (performance from Paris By Night 93: Celebrity Dancing – Khiêu Vũ Của Các Ngôi Sao)
7. Ngày Xưa Anh Hỡi © (Đồng Sơn) – Minh Tuyết (performance from Paris By Night 71: 20th Anniversary)
8. Đắng Cay (Lương Bằng Vinh) – Lưu Bích (performance from Paris By Night 75: Về Miền Viễn Đông – Journey to the Far East)
9. Men Say Tình Ái (Lời Việt: Hoài An) – Như Loan (performance from Paris By Night 63: Dòng Thời Gian)
10. Tình Nhạt Phai (Caravan of Life) – Don Hồ (performance from Paris By Night 29: In Las Vegas)
11. Lầm (Lam Phương) – Nguyễn Hưng (performance from Paris By Night 28: Lam Phương 2 – Dòng Nhạc Tiếp Nối – Sacrée Soirée 3)
12. Trở Về Cát Bụi (Lê Dinh) – Thế Son (performance from Paris By Night 38: In Toronto)
13. Yêu © (Nhật Trung) – Hợp Ca (performance from Paris By Night 65: Yêu)

03. Liên Khúc:

1. Chiều Mưa Biên Giới (Nguyễn Văn Đồng) – Mai Thiên Vân
2. Mấy Dặm Sơn Khê (Nguyễn Văn Đồng) – Thanh Tuyền

04. Liên Khúc:

1. Ðời Ðá Vàng (Vũ Thành An) – Khánh Hà
2. Tưởng Niệm (Trầm Tử Thiêng) – Trần Thái Hòa

05. Video Clip Thanh Bùi (from Australian Idol)

06. Mirror, Mirror! (Gương Thần, Gương Thần) (Thanh Bùi, Lời Việt: Viễn Trình) – Thanh Bùi

07. Phỏng Vấn Ca Sĩ Thanh Bùi

08. The Winner Takes It All (ABBA) – Thanh Bùi (Australian Idol)

09. Mùa Thu Cho Em (Ngô Thụy Miên) & Mộng Dưới Hoa (Nhạc: Phạm Đinh Chương, Thơ: Đinh Hùng) – Bằng Kiều & Trần Thu Hà

10. Liên Khúc:

1. Ngúời Lính Già Xa Quê Hương (Nhật Ngân)
2. Những Đóm Mắt Hỏa Châu (Hân Châu)
3. Xin Anh Giữ Trọn Tình Quê (Duy Khánh)

– Duy Trường, Khánh Hoàng & Quỳnh Dung

11. Một Mai Nếu Em Đi (Ne Me Quittes Pas) (Lời Việt: Lê Xuân Trường) – Nguyễn Hưng & Hồ Lệ Thu

12. Giết Người Trong Mộng (Phạm Duy) – Ngọc Anh

13. Liên Khúc:

1. Ngậm Ngùi (Phạm Duy, Thơ: Huy Cận) – Quang Tuấn
2. Mộ Khúc (Phạm Duy, Thơ: Xuân Diệu) – Ý Lan

14. Liên Khúc:

1. Lại Nhớ Người Yêu
2. Ước Mộng Ðôi Ta

– Phi Nhung & Mạnh Quỳnh

15. Phỏng Vấn Khán Giả Trong Rạp

16. Liên Khúc: Hởi Người Tình (Lời Việt: Ngọc Lan) – Tú Quyên & Như Loan

17. Cứ Ngũ Say (Nguyễn Hải Phong) – Mai Tiến Dũng & Hương Giang

18. Phỏng Vấn Khán Giả Trong Rạp

19. Liên Khúc:

1. Tình Em Ngọn Nến (Lời Việt: Khúc Lan)
2. Tàn Tro (Lời Việt: Julie)
3. Dù Tình Yêu Đã Mất (Hoàng Nhạc Đô)

– Don Hồ & Minh Tuyết

20. Liên Khúc:

1. Qua Cầu Gió Bay (Phạm Duy)
2. Buôn Bấc Buôn Dầu

– Trần Thái Hòa & Ngọc Hạ

21. M.C. “Thư Hỏi Sợ Vợ”

Bonus MTV

- Ðôi Mắt Người Xưa (Ngân Giang, Ðạo Diễn: Hoàng Tuấn Cường) – Quang Lê

=== Disc 2 ===
22. Hài Kịch: Áo Em Chưa Mặc Một Lần (Nguyễn Ngọc Ngạn) – Thúy Nga, Bằng Kiều, Chí Tài & Bé Tí

23. Phỏng Vấn Thúy Nga & Bằng Kiều

24. Nhạc Kịch: Ði Tìm Nửa Vầng Trăng

1. Tiễn Anh Về Với Người © (Tùng Châu & Thái Thịnh)
2. Tình Là Gì? (Thái Thịnh)

– Dương Triệu Vũ & Bảo Hân

25. Những Ðồi Hoa Sim (Dzũng Chinh, Thơ: Hữu Loan) – Mai Thiên Vân & Hoàng Oanh

26. Liên Khúc:

1. Thói Ðời (Trúc Phương)
2. Trong Tầm Mắt Đời (Tú Nhi)

– Duy Trường & Lý Duy Vũ

27. Phỏng Vấn Ca Sĩ Duy Trường & Lý Duy Vũ

28. Khi Người Xa Tôi (Lê Xuân Trường) – Nguyệt Anh & Chuyện Tình Thường Thế Thôi (Lê Quang) – Thùy Vân

29. Thương Chị © (Nhật Ngân) – Hà Phương & Hương Thủy

30. Phỏng Vấn Ca Sĩ Tóc Tiên

31. Tóc Mây (Phạm Thế Mỹ) – Tóc Tiên

32. Lặng Thầm (Vũ Hoàng) – Thế Sơn & Phượng Hồng (Nhạc: Vũ Hoàng, Thơ: Đỗ Trung Quân) – Thái Châu

33. Liên Khúc:

1. Một Cõi Ði Về (Trịnh Công Sơn)
2. Thành Phố Buồn (Lam Phương)
3. Như Cánh Vạt Bay (Trịnh Công Sơn)

– Khánh Ly & Chế Linh

34. Thôi Về Ði (Vĩnh Tâm) – Quỳnh Vi & Lam Anh

35. Dư Âm Tình Ta © (Hoài An) – Minh Tuyết & Trịnh Lam

36. Medley New Wave 80's – Thủy Tiên, Lưu Bích & Lương Tùng Quang

37.Finale

Bonus

- Hậu Trường Sân Khấu

Song: "Go With The Tien Anh", "Trade Sister", "Du Yin Love Me" was exclusive to Thuy Nga with the consent of the author. Translation prohibited any form criticism.

== End credits ==
- Lighting designer: Simon Miles & Victor Fable
- Lighting director: Harry Sangmeister
- Production designer: Bruce Ryans & Cung Đỗ
- Musical director: Tùng Châu
- Associate producer: Kim Tô
- Line producer: Teresa Taylor
- Production manager: Richard Võ
- Production coordinator: Kiệt Cao – Lynn Givens – John Nguyễn
- Choreographer: Shanda Sawyer
- Background graphic: Khanh Nguyễn – Cung Đỗ – Marie Tô
- Music arrangements:
  - Tùng Châu
  - Tim Heintz (Một Mai Nếu Em Đi; Giết Người Trong Mộng; Tóc Mây; Thôi Về Ði)
  - Nhật Trung (Opening Liên Khúc Top Hits; Ðời Ðá Vàng & Tưởng Niệm; Cứ Ngũ Say; Dư Âm Tình Ta)
  - Đòng Sơn (Ngậm Ngùi & Mộ Khúc; Liên Khúc Tình Em Ngọn Nến, Tàn Tro, Dù Tình Yêu Đã Mất; Lặng Thầm & Phượng Hồng)
  - Nguyễn Nhân (Medley New Wave 80's)
  - Vũ Quang Trung (Mùa Thu Cho Em & Mộng Dưới Hoa)
  - Thanh Bùi (Mirror, Mirror!)
- Ban Nhạc:
  - Lead guitar: Nguyễn Hùng
  - Acoustic guitar: Nguyễn Khoa
  - Bass: Nguyễn Cường
  - Keyboards: Nguyễn Bá Tỵ
  - Drums: Peter Pfiefer
  - Percussions: Trần Nam
  - Piano: Phạm Duy Ái
  - Đàn Tranh: Giang Thanh
  - Flute/Sáo: Nguyễn Bảo Ngọc
  - Sax, Oboe: Trần Bảo
  - Violins:
    - Paise Lam
    - Trần Mai Ly
    - Nguyễn Nguyệt Cầm
    - Swan Nguyễn
  - Cellos: Lydia Munchinsky
- Costume Dance Songs: Calvin Hiệp
  - Assisted by Jacky Tài
- Wardrobe: Jacky Tài & Tony Võ
- Assistant choreographers: Eugenia Huang & Tracy Shibata
- PBN Dancers: Lilit Avagyan – Taeko Carrol – Stella Chloe – Anh Dillon – Kristen Egusa – Krystal Ellsworth – Eugenia Huang – Yoori Kim – Marissa Ruazol – Katee Shean – Tracy Shibata – Paula Van Oppen – Steven Bermundo – Zack Brazenas – Vinh Bui – Dominic Chaiduang – P.J. Halili – Chris Liu – Buddy Mynatt – Fred Odgaard
- "Thương Chị"
  - Choreographed by Luân Vũ
  - Dancers: Trường Nghệ Thuật Dân Tộc Việt Cầm
- Make-up artists: Gordon Banh – Nhật Bình – Travis Vũ – Mona Lisa Nguyễn – Helena Phạm – Hương Vũ – Quân Phạm
- Hair stylists: Travis Vũ – Quincy Nguyễn – Philip Trương – Châu Hông
- Photographer: Huy Khiêm
  - Assisted by Joe Hernandez
- Props: Stephanie Furr – Lưu Nguyễn – Markus Beniger
- Comedy Furniture:
  - Euro Asian Furniture
  - 16039 Brookhurst St.
  - Fountain Valley, CA 92708
  - (714) 839 – 8809
- Art directors: Scott Heineman & Brian Livesay
- Staging supervisor: Thom Peachee
- Head carpenter: Scott Broeske
- Media server: Adrian Dickey
- PRG lead technician: Dave Seralles
- Gaffer: Maurice Dupleasis
- Best boy: Rob Kemery
- Technical director: Allan Wells
- Technical supervisor & video engineer: John Palacio
- Video engineer: Stuart Wesolik
- Video tape operator: Bruce Solberg
- Cameras: Danny Bonilla – Manny Bonilla – Joe Coppola – Suzanne Ebner – Suzanne Hylton – Katherine Lacafano – Allen Merriweather – Dennis Turner – Danny Webb
- Head video utility: Bill "Scratch" Griner
- Projection & LED technician: Nate Williams & Mike Russell
- Sound designer: Bart Chiate
- Sound mixer: Toby Foster
- Mixer: Eduardo Mackinlay
- Audio utility: Eddie Mckarge & Danny Ortiz
- BGI engineer in charge: Glenn Hazlett
- Director, entertainment Knotts Berry Farms: Craig Harreld
- Knotts Berry Farms theatre production manager: Lisa Heath
- Trucking: Scenic Expressions
- Set construction: Global Industries
- Lighting: PRG
- LED: Background Images
- Camera truck: Background Images
- Editors: Chris Osterhus & Khanh Nguyễn
- Assistant editor: Richard Buchanan
- Surround sound mixer: John Tomlinson
- Behind the scenes: Andy Vũ & Tony Hoàng
- RMI Cargo
- Viện Giải Phẩu Thẩm Mỹ Hạnh Phước (Houston, Texas)
- Little Saigon Radio
- Tuần Báo Việt Tide
- Hồn Việt TV
- Euro-Asian Furniture & Hệ Thống Kim Hoàn Ngọc Quang
- Nha Sĩ Lê Thanh Hằng
- Princess Cosmetics Surgery (Orange County, CA)
- Saving Call V247
- T4 Spa Concepts & Designs

| Preceded by Paris By Night 95: Paris By Night 25th Anniversary (Part II) - Cám Ơn Cuộc Ðời | Paris By Night; Paris By Night 96: Paris By Night 96 - Nhac Yeu Cau 2 | Succeeded by Paris By Night 97: Celebrity Dancing 2 |
