= Paris by Night 100 =

Paris By Night 100
- Paris by Night episode
- Paris By Night 100 poster
- Episode no.: Episode 100
- Directed by: Alan Carter
- Masters of ceremonies: Nguyễn Ngọc Ngạn; Nguyễn Cao Kỳ Duyên
- Filmed at: Planet Hollywood Resort & Casino, Paradise, Nevada
- Filmed on: July 3 and 4, 2010
- Venue: Planet Hollywood Theatre for the Performing Arts
- Executive producers: Marie Tô; Paul Huỳnh
- Format: 2 DVDs
- Release date: October 7, 2010

Paris By Night 100: Ghi Nhớ Một Chặng Đường is a Paris By Night program produced by Thúy Nga Productions that was filmed at the Planet Hollywood Theatre for the Performing Arts in Planet Hollywood Resort & Casino from July 3–4, 2010 and released DVD on October 7, 2010. The show was hosted by emcees Nguyễn Ngọc Ngạn and Nguyễn Cao Kỳ Duyên.

== Trivia ==
- Participation of the audience was up to 14,000 spectators that came from various states of the United States, Canada and other countries around the world, including France, Germany, Britain, Netherlands, Norway, Sweden, Australia, and from Vietnam. Ticket prices were considered the most expensive ever for a musical show overseas (ranging from $60 to $2,000).
- Included Bao Han's final performance, prior to her retirement until at least two appearances in Paris By Night 109: 30th Anniversary Celebration and Paris By Night 128: Hành Trình 35 Năm (Phần 3) – Feel the Lights.
- Due to piracy issues, as well as declining or poor sales of previous releases, this was rumored to be the last show for the production company.

== Track list ==
=== Disc 1 ===
01. Phần Mở Đầu

02. Mơ Một Tình Yêu (Tùng Châu & Thái Thịnh) – Minh Tuyết & Như Quỳnh

03. Lời Mở Đầu – Nguyễn Ngọc Ngạn & Nguyễn Cao Kỳ Duyên

04. Liên Khúc:

- Trăm Nhớ Ngàn Thương (Lam Phương)
- 10 Năm Tình Cũ (Trần Quảng Nam)
- Phải Chi Em Đừng Có Chồng (Mặc Thế Nhân)

– Ý Lan & Elvis Phương

05. Chân Trời Tím (Trần Thiện Thanh) – Hương Lan & Thái Châu

06. My Shining Star (Bảo Thạch) – Bảo Hân

07. Phóng Vấn Bảo Hân

08. Liên Khúc:

- Tiễn Đưa (Song Ngọc, Thơ: Nguyên Sa)
- Về Mái Nhà Xưa (Nguyễn Văn Đông)

– Khánh Ly & Thanh Tuyền

09. Ngày Đó Chúng Mình (Phạm Duy) – Ngọc Hạ & Trần Thái Hòa

10. Liên Khúc:

- Dịu Dàng Đến Từng Phút Giây (Lương Bằng Quang)
- Như Vẫn Còn Đây © (Phúc Trường)

– Mai Tiến Dũng & Hương Giang

11. Tân Cổ Giao Duyên: Ngày Buồn (Lam Phương, Vọng Cổ: Nguyễn Nhân Tâm) – Mạnh Quỳnh – Phi Nhung

12. PBN 100 Special Award: Cung Đỗ & Linh Xuân

13. Liên Khúc:

- Mẹ Từ Bi (Nhạc: Chúc Linh, Lời: Hòa Thượng Thích Từ Giang)
- Chùa Tôi (Chúc Linh)

– Hương Thủy & Kỳ Phương Uyên

14. Video Clip: PBN & Nhạc Dân Ca

15. PBN 100 Special Award: Shanda Sawyer

16. Xin Lỗi Anh © (Hoài An) – Minh Tuyết & Bằng Kiều

17. Chuyện Tình Buồn 100 Năm (Song Ngọc) – Mai Thiên Vân & Quang Lê

18. Special Guest: Nữ Tài Tử Kiều Chinh

19. Liên Khúc:

- Tình Chết Theo Mùa Đông (Lam Phương)
- Vết Thương Cuối Cùng (Diên An)

– Lương Tùng Quang & Hồ Lệ Thu

20. Đố Vui Khán Giả

21. Tại Sao Là Không? © (Diệu Hương) – Thanh Hà & Don Hồ

22. Video Clip: "Tưởng Niệm"

23. Con Ðường Mang Tên Em (Trúc Phương) – Như Quỳnh & Trường Vũ

24. Belle (Lời Việt: Thái Thịnh) – Trần Thái Hòa, Thế Sơn & Trịnh Lam

=== Disc 2 ===
01. Phần Mở Đầu Đĩa 2

02. Lời Ngỏ Trung Tâm Thúy Nga: Tô Ngọc Thủy

03. Special Guest: Mr. Jean Pierre Barry (CEO Euromedia Television)

04. Hài Kịch: Sao Em Nỡ Vội Lấy Tiền (Nguyễn Ngọc Ngạn) – Bằng Kiều, Thúy Nga, Chí Tài & Hương Thủy

05. Đố Vui Khán Giả

06. Liên Khúc:

- Tôi Muốn Quên Người (Khánh Băng)
- Nửa Hồn Thương Đau (Phạm Đình Chương)

– Nguyễn Hưng & Ngọc Anh

07. Special Guest: Tom Treutler

08. Vì Sao Ta Mất Nhau © (Quốc Hùng) – Trịnh Lam & Quỳnh Vi

09. Đố Vui Khán Giả

10. Chỉ Còn Đêm Nay (Abanibi) (Nurit Hirsh, Lời Việt: Chiêu Nghi) – Lynda Trang Đài & Tommy Ngô

11. Đố Vui Khán Giả

12. Liên Khúc:

- Nó Và Tôi (Song Ngọc)
- Những Ngày Xưa Thân Ái (Phạm Thế Mỹ)

– Duy Trường, Thành An & Quỳnh Dung

13. The Prayer (Carole Bayer Sager & David Foster) – Khánh Hà & Tuấn Ngọc

14. Giọt Mưa Thu (Đặng Thế Phong & Bùi Công Kỳ) – Lam Anh & Nguyệt Anh

15. PBN 100 Special Award: Nhạc Sĩ Tùng Châu

16. Giọt Lệ Cho Ngàn Sau (Từ Công Phụng) – Duy Quang & Phi Khanh

17. Cho Em Mãi Được Yêu (Lời Việt: Khúc Lan) – Tú Quyên & Diễm Sương

18. Đố Vui Khán Giả

19. Liên Khúc:

- Một Ngày Không Có Anh (Y Vân, Thơ: Nguyễn Long)
- Nếu Một Ngày (Khánh Băng)

– Lưu Bích & Thủy Tiên

20. Đố Vui Khán Giả

21. Liên Khúc:

1. Lời Cuối Cho Em (Nguyễn Ánh 9)
2. Nhìn Nhau Lần Cuối (Nguyễn Vũ)
3. Điều Giản Dị (Phú Quang)
4. Yêu Em (Lê Hựu Hà)

– Thu Phương & Thế Sơn

22. Lời Cảm Tạ – Nguyễn Ngọc Ngạn & Nguyễn Cao Kỳ Duyên

23. Tình Còn Đam Mê © (Võ Hoài Phúc) – Tóc Tiên & Như Loan

24. Finale

BONUS: Video Clip: Nếu Điều Đó Xảy Ra (Đạo Diễn: Nguyễn Khanh, Kịch Bản: Nguyễn Ngọc Ngạn) – Quang Lê, Minh Tuyết, Lương Tùng Quang, Mai Thiên Vân, Hương Thủy & Như Loan

Những nhạc phẩm: "Mơ Một Tình Yêu", "My Shining Star", "Như Vẫn Còn Đây", "Xin Lỗi Anh", "Tại Sao Là Không?", "Vì Sao Ta Mất Nhau", "Tình Còn Đam Mê" độc quyền cho trung tâm Thúy Nga. Cấm thu audio, video, hoặc trích dịch dưới mọi hình thức.

== VIP party ==
Soon after the last show on July 4, Thuy Nga arranged a VIP Party in celebration of the completion of Paris by Night 100. Attendees included performers, crew, the attenders with a VIP Paris by Night ticket, Harrah's Casino invited guests, and those with a special invitation. The party was filmed and was released on December 9, 2010. The DVD included many special features including Red Carpet Interviews, a 40-minute Behind-The-Scenes film, and Nhu Loan and Toc Tien's performance of 'Passion Remains' in Jerry Lewis's 2010 MDA Telethon.

=== Setlist ===
The DVD cover for Paris by Night 100's VIP Party

Red Carpet Hosts: Như Loan, Tú Quyên, Tóc Tiên, Quang Lê

1. Cùng Khiêu Vũ Bên Nhau – Lam Anh, Kỳ Phương Uyên
2. Thế Giới Không Tình Yêu – Lương Tùng Quang
3. Hai Vì Sao Lạc – Mai Thiên Vân
4. Mưa Đêm Ngoại Ô – Quang Lê
5. Vị Ngọt Đôi Môi – Hồ Lệ Thu
6. Paris Có Gì Lạ Không Em? – Ý Lan
7. Lạnh Lùng – Như Quỳnh
8. Vết Thù Trên Lưng Ngựa Hoang – Nguyễn Hưng
9. Trái Tim Còn Trinh – Trần Thái Hòa, Quỳnh Vi
10. Còn Chút Gi Để Nhớ – Thế Sơn
11. Như Đã Dấu Yêu – Minh Tuyết, Bằng Kiều
12. Ngàn Năm Vẫn Đợi – Ngọc Anh
13. LK Trái Tim Ngục Tù & Papa – Trịnh Lam, Don Hồ
14. I Will Survive – Khánh Hà
15. The House of Rising Sun – Elvis Phương
16. Blue Suede Shoes – Elvis Phương
17. The Making of Paris By Night 100 (Behind the Scenes)
18. Passion Remains – Như Loan, Tóc Tiên
19. Hài Kịch "Hữu Duyên Thiên Lý" – Việt Hương, Hoài Tâm
20. Quay Mặt Bước Đi – Mai Tiến Dũng (MTV)
21. Nửa Đêm Thương Nhớ – Tâm Phương Anh (MTV)
22. Xin Vẫy Tay Chào – Duy Trường (MTV)

== Sources ==
- (in Vietnamese)

Preceded by Paris By Night Special Edition: Divas	Paris By Night; Paris By Night 100: Ghi Nhớ Một Chặng Đường	Succeeded by Paris By Night 101: Hạnh Phúc Đầu Năm
