= Paris by Night 101 =

Paris By Night 101 Hạnh Phúc Đầu Năm
- Paris by Night episode
- Episode no.: Episode 101
- Directed by: Alan Carter
- Masters of ceremonies: Nguyễn Ngọc Ngạn; Nguyễn Cao Kỳ Duyên
- Filmed at: Temecula, California
- Filmed on: November 13 & 14, 2010
- Venue: Pechanga Resort and Casino
- Executive producers: Marie Tô; Paul Huỳnh
- Format: 2-disc DVD set
- Release date: January 14, 2011

Paris By Night 101: Hạnh Phúc Đầu Năm is a Paris By Night program produced by Thúy Nga Productions that was filmed inside the Pechanga Theater at Pechanga Resort and Casino, California on November 13 & 14, 2010. This is the fourth Paris by Night program celebrating Tết followed three previous editions: Paris by Night 85: Xuân Trong Kỷ Niệm (2007), Paris By Night 80: Tết Khắp Mọi Nhà (2006) and Paris by Night 76: Xuân Tha Hương (2005). The DVD was released on January 14, 2011.

== Concept ==
The program is a part of "Thúy Nga Tết Quadrilogy" to celebrate Lunar New Year. The other seven programs are Paris by Night 76: Xuân Tha Hương, Paris by Night 80: Tết Khắp Mọi Nhà, Paris by Night 85: Xuân Trong Kỷ Niệm, Paris By Night 110: Phát Lộc Đầu Năm, Paris By Night 113: Mừng Tuổi Mẹ, Paris By Night 124: Anh Cho Em Mùa Xuân, Paris By Night 131: Xuân Hy Vọng and Paris By Night 132: Xuân Với Đời Sống Mới.

== Track list ==
Disc 1

01. Ngày Tết Việt Nam (Hoài An) - Tóc Tiên, Quỳnh Vi, Nguyệt Anh, Hương Giang, Diễm Sương, Kỳ Phương Uyên

02. Thư Xuân Hải Ngoại (Trầm Tử Thiêng) - Ngọc Hạ

03. Nghĩ Chuyện Ngày Xuân (Song Ngọc) - Mai Thiên Vân

04. Khúc Giao Mùa (Huy Tuấn) - Trịnh Lam, Lam Anh

05. Quê Hương Mùa Xuân (Tiến Luân) - Phi Nhung

06. Chí Tài chúc Tết

07. Mộng Chiều Xuân (Ngọc Bích) - Thanh Hà / Phố Hoa (Hoài An) - Như Loan

08. Đố vui khán giả

09. Những Kiếp Hoa Xuân (Anh Bằng) - Hồ Lệ Thu / Cánh Hoa Xưa (Hoàng Trọng) - Khánh Ly

10. Giao Mùa (Võ Hoài Phúc) - Lưu Bích, Trần Quang Vũ

11. Hoài Tâm chúc Tết

12. Người Tình Ơi! Mơ Gì (Nguyễn Tường Văn) - Mai Tiến Dũng & Tóc Tiên

13. Đố vui khán giả với Quang Lê

14. Quê Tôi (Minh Vy) - Tú Quyên, Hương Giang, Diễm Sương

15. Liên Khúc:

- Trăng Về Thôn Dã (Hoài An, Huyền Linh)
- Rước Tình Về Với Quê Hương (Hoàng Thi Thơ)

- Thế Sơn, Hương Thủy

16. Chúc Xuân (Lữ Liên) - Việt Hương, Bé Tí, Thúy Nga

17. Hát Với Chú Ve Con (Thanh Tùng) - Minh Tuyết

18. Tom Treutler chúc Tết

19. Chân Tình (Trần Lê Quỳnh) - Lương Tùng Quang / Điệp Khúc Mùa Xuân (Quốc Dũng) - Thủy Tiên

Disc 2

01. Em Đã Thấy Mùa Xuân Chưa? (Quốc Dũng) - Khánh Hà

02. Giọt Café Đầu Tiên (Trần Thiện Thanh) - Mạnh Quỳnh & Trường Vũ

03. Việt Hương chúc Tết

04. Tình Có Như Không (Trần Thiện Thanh) - Nguyễn Hưng

05. Thúy Nga chúc Tết

06. Hài Kịch: Đám Cưới Đầu Xuân (Nguyễn Ngọc Ngạn) - Chí Tài, Bé Tí, Hoài Tâm, Carol Kim, Tom Treutler 07. Phỏng vấn Carol Kim

08. Xuân Đẹp Làm Sao (Thanh Sơn) - Như Quỳnh

09. Bé Tí chúc Tết

10. Ngày Xuân Thăm Nhau (Hoài An, Trang Dũng Phương) - Duy Trường & Quỳnh Dung

11. Mùa Xuân Trên Đỉnh Bình Yên (Từ Công Phụng) - Quang Dũng

12. Đố vui khán giả với Mai Thiên Vân

13. Xuân Với Đời Sống Mới (Tuấn Vũ) - Ngọc Anh

14. Nụ Cười Sơn Cước (Tô Hải) - Trần Thái Hòa

15. Nụ Xuân (Vũ Anh Hùng) - Quỳnh Vi, Nguyệt Anh

16. Đố vui khán giả

17. Bài Ca Tết Cho Em (Quốc Dũng) - Quang Lê

18. Ca Khúc Mừng Xuân (Văn Phụng) - Don Hồ, Kỳ Phương Uyên

19. Finale

Preceded by Paris By Night 100: Ghi Nhớ Một Chặng Đường	Paris By Night; Paris By Night 101: Hạnh Phúc Đầu Năm	Succeeded by Paris By Night 102: Nhạc Yêu Cầu - Tình Ca Lam Phương
