= Paris by Night 98 =

Paris By Night 98
- Paris by Night episode
- PBN 98 Poster
- Episode no.: Episode 98
- Directed by: Alan Carter
- Masters of ceremonies: Nguyễn Ngọc Ngạn; Nguyễn Cao Kỳ Duyên
- Filmed at: Planet Hollywood Resort & Casino, Paradise, Nevada
- Filmed on: September 18–19, 2009
- Venue: Theatre for the Performing Arts
- Executive producers: Marie Tô; Paul Huỳnh
- Format: 2-Disc DVD
- Release date: December 10, 2009

Paris by Night 98: Fly With Us to Las Vegas is a Paris by Night program produced by Thúy Nga that was filmed at the Theatre for the Performing Arts in Planet Hollywood Resort & Casino on September 18 and 19, 2009 and had a DVD release on December 10, 2009. The show was hosted by Nguyễn Ngọc Ngạn and Nguyễn Cao Kỳ Duyên.

== Track listing ==
Disc 1

1. Video clip: "Welcome Aboard Flight PBN 098"
2. Chuyến Bay Hạnh Phúc (Hoài An) - Lưu Bích, Bảo Hân, Tú Quyên, Thủy Tiên, Nguyệt Anh, Như Quỳnh, Như Loan, Hồ Lệ Thu, Ngọc Anh, Hương Thủy, Quỳnh Vi, Minh Tuyết
3. LK Còn Gì Nữa Đâu, Kiếp Nào Có Yêu Nhau (Phạm Duy) - Trần Thái Hòa, Ngọc Hạ
4. LK Hai Lối Mộng, Chuyện Chúng Mình, Tàu Đêm Năm Cũ (Trúc Phương) - Hương Lan, Thanh Tuyền
5. LK Send Me An Angel & So Sad (Lời Việt : Chiêu Nghi) - Dương Triệu Vũ, Lam Anh
6. Đố vui khán giả
7. LK Chiều Một Mình Qua Phố, Gọi Tên Bốn Mùa (Trịnh Công Sơn) - Khánh Ly, Thế Sơn
8. Đố vui khán giả
9. LK Nhớ Nhau Hoài (Anh Việt Thu) - Quang Lê & Cho Người Vào Cuộc Chiến (Phan Trân) - Mai Thiên Vân
10. Phỏng vấn Quang Lê, Mai Thiên Vân
11. Không Muốn Yêu (Huỳnh Nhật Tân) - Bảo Hân, Lynda Trang Đài, Tommy Ngô
12. Một Mai Em Rời Xa (Võ Hoài Phúc) - Trịnh Lam, Nguyệt Anh
13. LK Phố Cũ Vắng Anh (Lời Việt: Minh Tâm) - Minh Tuyết & Sao Phải Cách Xa (Lời Việt : Võ Hoài Phúc) - Nguyễn Thắng
14. LK Chuyến Tàu 4:55 (Lời Việt : Lê Xuân Trường) - Don Hồ & Boulevard - Như Loan
15. LK Nụ Cười Biệt Ly (Ngọc Sơn) - Thành An, Nhớ Người Yêu (Hoàng Hoa, Thảo Trang) - Lý Duy Vũ & Mất Nhau Rồi (Ngân Trang) - Duy Trường
16. Biển Cạn (Kim Tuấn) - Khánh Hà, Bằng Kiều
17. LK Đoản Khúc Cuối Cho Em (Hoàng Trọng Thụy) - Diễm Sương & Hãy Nói Với Em (Lời Việt : Hà Quang Minh) - Kỳ Phương Uyên
18. Phỏng vấn Diễm Sương và Kỳ Phương Uyên
19. LK Đêm Trắng (Võ Hoàng Phúc) - Nguyễn Hưng & Dẫu Biết (Nhật Trung) - Lưu Bích
20. Dân biểu Quốc hội Hoa Kỳ Joseph Cao
21. LK Bài Không Tên Số 4 (Vũ Thành An) - Ngọc Anh & Thu Đến Bao Giờ (Lam Phương) - Hồ Lệ Thu

Disc 2

1. Giới thiệu kịch
2. Hài Kịch: Trẻ Mãi Không Già (Nguyễn Ngọc Ngạn) - Thúy Nga, Chí Tài, Hương Thủy, Bé Tí
3. Đố vui khán giả
4. Đôi Khi Em Muốn Khóc (Lời Việt : Lê Xuân Trường) - Tú Quyên, Hương Giang
5. Đố vui khán giả
6. Tân Cổ Giao Duyên: Áo Mới Cà Mau (Tân nhạc : Thanh Sơn, Cổ nhạc : Viễn Châu) - Phi Nhung, Mai Thiên Vân
7. Video Clip: Thói đời - Nguyễn Ngọc Ngạn, Nguyễn Cao Kỳ Duyên, Kiều Linh
8. Mơ Ánh Trăng Về (Lời Việt : Như Quỳnh, Huỳnh Gia Tuấn) - Như Quỳnh
9. Bông Ô Môi (Sơn Hạ) - Quang Lê, Hà Phương
10. Bất Chợt Tình Yêu (Nguyễn Đức Cường) - Mai Tiến Dũng
11. LK Nỗi Đau Ấm Thầm (Quốc An) - Quỳnh Vi & Tại Vì Ai (Đăng Khoa) - Lương Tùng Quang
12. LK Lý Quạ Kêu (Dân ca) - Hương Thủy & Dệt Tầm Gai (Quốc Đại, Thơ : Vi Thùy Linh) - Trần Thu Hà
13. Đố vui khán giả
14. LK Đức Huy: Mùa Hè Đẹp Nhất, Bay Đi Cánh Chim Biển, Luôn Luôn Mãi Mãi - Ý Lan, Quang Dũng
15. Con Đường Màu Xanh (Trịnh Nam Sơn) - Thủy Tiên, Trần Thái Hòa
16. Một Lần Nữa Xin Có Nhau (Phương Uyên) - Minh Tuyết, Bằng Kiều
17. I Say Gold (Marc Lavoine) - Phạm Quỳnh Anh
18. Finale

Preceded by Paris By Night 97: Celebrity Dancing 2	Paris by Night; Paris by Night 98: Fly with Us to Las Vegas	Succeeded by Paris by Night 99: Tôi Là Người Việt Nam
