= Paris by Night 94 =

Paris By Night 25th Anniversary (Part I)
- Paris by Night episode
- Poster for PBN 94
- Episode no.: Episode 94
- Directed by: Alan Carter
- Masters of ceremonies: Nguyễn Ngọc Ngạn; Nguyễn Cao Kỳ Duyên; Nguyễn Văn Thịnh
- Filmed at: Long Beach, California
- Filmed on: September 20, 2008
- Venue: Terrace Theater
- Executive producers: Marie To; Paul Huynh
- Format: 2-Disc DVD
- Release date: December 12th, 2008

Paris By Night 94: 25th Anniversary is a Paris By Night program produced by Thúy Nga that was filmed at the Terrace Theater at the Long Beach Convention and Entertainment Center on September 20, 2008.

The program is the first part of a two-part program produced by Thúy Nga to celebrate the 25th anniversary of the reestablishment of Thúy Nga overseas.

== Track list ==
Disc 1

1. Vũ Khúc Paris Và Hãy Cho Tôi Ngày Mai – Quỳnh Vi, Như Loan, Dương Triệu Vũ, Trịnh Lam, Lương Tùng Quang, Minh Tuyết, Bảo Hân, Hồ Lệ Thu & Celina Linh Thy
2. Tình Nghèo – Ngọc Hạ & Quang Lê
3. Suối Lệ Xanh – Họa Mi
4. Ngợi Ca Quê Hương Em – Hương Thủy
5. Bản Tình Ca Cho Em – Bằng Kiều
6. Em Phải Làm Sao – Thủy Tiên
7. Liên Khúc The Final Countdown – Trizzie Phương Trinh, Lynda Trang Đài & Tommy Ngô
8. Tân Cổ: Kiếp Cầm Ca – Phượng Liên & Phi Nhung
9. Niệm Khúc Cuối – Elvis Phương & Khánh Ly
10. Diễm Xưa – Don Hồ
11. Đừng Trách Sáo Sang Sông – Hà Phương
12. Mãi Mãi Không Ân Hận – Lương Tùng Quang

Disc 2

1. Skit: Thế Giới Huyền Bí – Chí Tài, Hoài Linh & Uyên Chi
2. Đêm Đông – Nguyễn Hưng
3. Liên Khúc: Hãy Cho Tôi & Con Tim Mù Lòa – Nguyễn Huy Thần Đồng
4. 7000 Đêm Góp Lại – Hương Lan
5. Anh Đi Chiến Dịch – Thanh Tuyền
6. Thinking Of You – Bảo Hân & Tú Quyên
7. Mùa Đông Của Anh – Thế Sơn & Hương Giang
8. Như Chiếc Que Diêm – Quang Dũng
9. Đã Không Còn Hối Tiếc – Minh Tuyết
10. Áo Em Chưa Mặc Một Lần & Vòng Nhẫn Cưới – Mai Thiên Vân & Quang Lê
11. Liên Khúc: Lời Yêu Thương – Duy Quang, Đức Huy, Tuấn Ngọc & Thái Châu
12. Nếu Có Yêu Tôi – Khánh Hà
13. Bonus MTV: Ngàn Năm Vẫn Ðợi – Như Loan

Preceded by Paris By Night 93: Celebrity Dancing - Khiêu Vũ Của Các Ngôi Sao	Paris By Night; Paris By Night 94: 25th Anniversary (Part I)	Succeeded by Paris By Night 95: Paris By Night 25th Anniversary (Part II): Cám Ơn Cuộc Ðời
