= Paris by Night 77 =

30 Năm Viễn Xứ
- Paris by Night episode
- Poster for PBN 77
- Episode no.: Episode 77
- Directed by: Michael Watt
- Masters of ceremonies: Nguyễn Ngọc Ngạn; Nguyễn Cao Kỳ Duyên
- Filmed at: Long Beach, California
- Filmed on: March 5, 2005
- Venue: Terrace Theater
- Executive producers: Marie Tô; Paul Huỳnh
- Format: 2-Disc DVD
- Release date: April 28, 2005

Paris By Night 77: 30 Năm Viễn Xứ (English translation: Thirty Years Away from the Motherland) is a Paris By Night program produced by Thúy Nga that was filmed at the Terrace Theater in the Long Beach Convention and Entertainment Center on March 5, 2005. It was released to DVD on April 28, 2005, two months later, just in time 2 days before the 30th anniversary of the Fall of Saigon on April 30, 2005.

== Concept ==
The show contains songs, musicals and documentary footage for remembering the Fall of Saigon on April 30, 1975, and how the Vietnamese communities from all over the world have evolved after fleeing the country. There were also interviews with American and Canadian officials who helped Vietnamese refugees in their resettlement. To keep the show formal, it did not have a comedy skit ("Hài Kịch") on the DVD. In the show itself, there was a comedy skit featuring Chi Tai, My Huyen, Kieu Linh and Mai Lan. This comedy skit was called Chung Benh Nan Y 2, a continuation of the comedy skit from PBN 72

It is considered one of Thúy Nga's most memorable programs ever produced to date. The program contains emotional clips of the Vietnamese diaspora and emotional songs relating to those who fled their homeland.

== Track list ==
=== Disc 1 ===
01. Phim Tài Liệu: 30 Tháng Tư 1975

02. Tôi Cố Bám... (Nguyễn Đình Toàn) - Khánh Ly

03. Đêm Chôn Dầu Vượt Biển (Châu Đình An) - Như Quỳnh

04. Sài Gòn Ơi! Vỉnh Biệt (Lam Phương) - Khánh Hà

05. Xin Đời Một Nụ Cười (Nam Lộc) - Khánh Ly, Thế Sơn & Trần Thái Hòa

06. Phim Tài Liệu: Tàu Ánh Sáng, L'Ile de Lumière

07. Cay Đắng Bờ Môi (Châu Đình An) - Quang Lê

08. Tân Cổ: Hình Bóng Quê Nhà (Tân Nhạc: Thanh Sơn, Vọng Cổ: Mạnh Quỳnh) - Mạnh Quỳnh & Hương Thủy

09. Hải Ngoại Thương Ca (Nguyễn Văn Đông) - Lệ Thu

10. Phim Tài Liệu: Hội Y Sĩ Thế Giới - Tàu Jean Charcot

11. Phỏng Vấn: Bác Sĩ Đinh Xuân Anh Tuấn

12. Liên Khúc:

1. Còn Mãi Yêu Thương (Trần Quảng Nam) - Loan Châu
2. Tình Đẹp Như Mơ (Lam Phương) - Hồ Lệ Thu

13. Phim Tài Liệu: Tàu Cap Anamur, Đức & Phỏng Vấn Tiến Sĩ Rupert Neudeck

14. Phỏng Vấn Dân Biểu Quốc Hội Mỹ Bà Madeleine Z. Bordallo

15. Bài Ca Học Trò (Phan Ni Tấn) - Thế Sơn

16. Hương Bình Lưu Luyến (Hồ Kym Thanh) - Hoàng Oanh

17. Buồn Vương Màu Áo (Ngọc Trọng) - Nguyễn Hưng

18. Rồi 30 Năm Qua © (Nhật Ngân) - Tâm Đoan

=== Disc 2 ===
19. Biết Bao Giờ Trở Lại © (Ngô Thụy Miên) - Trần Thái Hòa

20. Về Đây Nghe Em (Trần Quang Lộc) - Tuấn Ngọc

21. Người Tình Trăm Năm (Đức Huy) - Thủy Tiên

22. Đợi Bước Anh Về (Trinh Nam Sơn) - Minh Tuyết

23. Phóng Sự Ngắn: Cộng Đồng Người Việt Tại Canada

24. Phỏng Vấn: Cựu Đô Trưởng Ottawa, Canada: Bà Marion Dewar

25. Phóng Sự Ngắn: Cộng Đồng Người Việt Tại Mỹ

26. Phóng Sự Ngắn: Cộng Đồng Người Việt Tại Tiệp Khắc, Đông Đức & Ba Lan

27. Mãi Còn Yêu © (Nhật Trung) - Bảo Hân & Như Loan

28. Phóng Sự Ngắn: Cộng Đồng Người Việt Tại Louisiana

29. Liên Khúc:

1. Con Đường Xưa Em Đi (Châu Kỳ - Hồ Đình Phương)
2. Xin Anh Giữ Trọn Tình Quê (Duy Khánh)

- Như Quỳnh & Trường Vũ

30. Liên Khúc:

1. Cho Tôi Lại Từ Đầu (Trần Quang Lộc)
2. Quê Hương, Tuổi Thơ Tôi (Từ Huy)

- Thu Phương

31. Vá Lại Tình Tôi © (Tâm Nguyên) - Bằng Kiều

32. Liên Khúc:

1. Ước Hẹn (Lời Việt: Lữ Liên)
2. Tan Tác (Lời Việt: Lữ Liên)

- Lưu Bích

33. Phóng Sự Ngắn: Cộng Đồng Người Việt Tại Paris & London

34. Viễn Khúc Việt Nam (Tấn Phát) - Dương Triệu Vũ

35. Phim Tài Liệu: To America, Love & Gratitude

36. Phỏng Vấn: Thiếu Tá Nguyễn Quý An & Đại Tá Noburu Masuoka

37. I'm Tired © (Adam Hồ) - Adam Hồ

38. Like The Birds (Lời Việt: Vân Quỳnh) - Vân Quỳnh

39. Phóng Sự Ngắn: Cộng Đồng Người Việt Tại Úc Châu

40. Nước Mắt (Trần Huân) - Lương Tùng Quang

41. Lời Cảm Ơn © (Nhạc: Ngô Thụy Miên, Lời Việt: Hạ Đỗ Chung Bích Phượng) - Hợp Ca

Preceded by Paris By Night 76: Xuân Tha Hương	Paris By Night; Paris By Night 77: 30 Năm Viễn Xứ	Succeeded by Paris By Night 78: Đường Xưa
