= Paris by Night 88 =

Lam Phương - Đường Về Quê Hương
- Paris by Night episode
- Poster for PBN 88
- Episode no.: Episode 88
- Directed by: Alan Carter
- Masters of ceremonies: Nguyễn Ngọc Ngạn; Nguyễn Cao Kỳ Duyên
- Filmed at: Houston, Texas
- Filmed on: May 5, 2007
- Venue: Hobby Center for the Performing Arts
- Executive producers: Marie To; Paul Huynh
- Format: 2-Disc DVD
- Release date: July 5, 2007

Paris By Night 88: Lam Phương - Đường Về Quê Hương (Thế giới Road Back to my homeland) is a Paris By Night program produced by Thúy Nga that was filmed at the Hobby Center for the Performing Arts in Houston, Texas on Saturday, May 5, 2007. It is a direct continuation of Paris By Night 22: 40 Năm Âm Nhạc Lam Phương and Paris By Night 28: Lam Phương 2 - Dòng Nhạc Nối Tiếp, that was released several years earlier. This program was codenamed, In Houston 2 (which was thought to be a successor to Paris By Night 36: In Houston, before the title was announced). Before the main subject title was announced, the program was then codenamed In Houston 2: Lam Phương 3 (the third Lam Phương series). The three were scrapped off the title and the subject was, Lam Phương.

Vietnamese composer, Lam Phương, is one of the Vietnamese community's most famous composers today composing famous songs before and even after the Vietnam War, and the Fall of Saigon in 1975. Since the early years of Paris By Night, Thúy Nga has been making single-composer videos dedicated to just a single composer. Starting in Paris By Night 64: Ðêm Văn Nghệ Thính Phòng however, Thuy Nga introduced the three-composer format. That trend continued in Paris By Night 66: Người Tình và Quê Hương, Paris By Night 70: Thu Ca, Paris By Night 74: Hoa Bướm Ngày Xưa, Paris By Night 78: Ðường Xưa, and finally in Paris By Night 83: Những Khúc Hát Ân Tình. However, composer Lam Phương is an exception. After being beloved by many, and his songs are on a timeless label, Thúy Nga thought that he should deserve the entire program dedicated to him and his songs, in a program meant for three composers.

Paris By Night 88 is Thúy Nga's third live-performance show, after Paris By Night 86 and 87, which was the PBN Talent Show. This is a trend that Thúy Nga may be beginning to adapt, after years of having singers lip-sync on stage, a practice that is common and accepted in the Vietnamese music community.

Paris By Night 88 used famous songs that were originally performed in Paris By Night 28 and Paris By Night 22, which were part of the Lam Phương series.

This is also director Alan Carter's first direction of Paris By Night, in place of its regular director, Michael Watt after many years. Carter has been credited with many successful programs, including the 2007 Miss America Pageant, the 2007 CMT Music Awards, and the 2005 Miss Universe Pageant.

== Tracklist ==
Disc 1

01. Video clip "Giới thiệu nhạc sĩ Lam Phương"

02. Đoàn Người Lữ Thứ - Thế Sơn, Trần Thái Hòa, Lương Tùng Quang, Dương Triệu Vũ, Trịnh Lam, Huy Tâm, Tâm Đoan, Hương Thủy, Ngọc Liên, Ngọc Loan, Quỳnh Vi, Hương Giang

03. Kiếp Nghèo - Ý Lan

04. Video clip "Vạn Sự Khởi Đầu Nan..."

05. Thành Phố Buồn, Tình Như Mây Khói - Chế Linh, Mai Quốc Huy

06. Tiễn Người Đi - Hương Lan

07. Phỏng vấn ca sĩ Hương Lan

08. Bức Tâm Thư - Như Loan, Ngọc Loan

09. Video clip: "Lam Phương và nơi ông sinh ra"

10. Chiều Tàn - Hoàng Oanh

11. Biết Đến Bao Giờ, Đêm Tiền Đồn - Mạnh Quỳnh, Trường Vũ

12. Phỏng vấn nhà thơ Nhất Tuấn

13. Ngày Hạnh Phúc - Tâm Đoan, Hương Thủy, Minh Tuyết, Ngọc Liên

14. Nghẹn Ngào - Khánh Hà

15. Phút Cuối - Bằng Kiều

16. Video clip "Nhạc sĩ Lam Phương nói về tác phẩm Em Đi Rồi"

17. Em Đi Rồi - Họa Mi

18. Musical : Chuyện Tình Thời Chinh Chiến

1. Ngày Tạm Biệt
2. Khóc Thầm
3. Chiều Hoang Vắng
4. Con Tàu Định Mệnh
5. Mất
6. Vĩnh Biệt Người Tình

- Như Quỳnh, Thế Sơn & Supporting by: Lương Tùng Quang, Trịnh Lam, Huy Tâm & Quỳnh Vi

19. Phỏng vấn ông Trần Đình Trường

20. Chuyến Đò Vỹ Tuyến - Tâm Đoan

21. Phỏng vấn cựu đại tá Nguyễn Văn Nam

22. Đường Về Quê Hương - Quang Lê

Disc 2

01. Vinh danh nhạc sĩ Lam Phương

02. Nắng Đẹp Miền Nam, Khúc Ca Ngày Mùa - Hà Phương, Hương Thủy

03. Khán giả với nhạc Lam Phương

04. Skit : Lầm - Hoài Linh, Chí Tài

05. Say, Lầm - Dương Triệu Vũ, Trịnh Lam

06. Ngày Em Đi - Nguyễn Hưng

07. Video clip "Lam Phương nói về tác phẩm Cho Em Quên Tuổi Ngọc"

08. Cho Em Quên Tuổi Ngọc - Bạch Yến, Trần Thu Hà

09. Liên Khúc :

1. Thiên Đàng Ái Ân
2. Chỉ Có Em
3. Tình Vẫn Chưa Yên

- Bảo Hân, Thủy Tiên, Lương Tùng Quang

10. Phỏng vấn ca sĩ Bạch Yến

11. Liên Khúc :

1. Trăm Nhớ Ngàn Thương
2. Tình Bơ Vơ

- Trần Thái Hòa, Ngọc Liên

12. Video clip "Lam Phương và Paris"

13. Bài Tango Cho Em - Khánh Ly & Supporting by: Tuấn Hùng & Thùy Vân

14. Mùa Thu Yêu Đương - Huy Tâm, Quỳnh Vi

15. Chờ Người - Bằng Kiều, Trần Thu Hà

16. Mình Mất Nhau Bao Giờ - Minh Tuyết

17. Video clip "Lam Phương bây giờ"

18. Một Mình - Hương Giang

- Behind the Scenes

Preceded by Paris By Night 87: PBN Talent Show - Finals	Paris By Night; Paris By Night 88: Lam Phương - Đường Về Quê Hương	Succeeded by Paris By Night 89: In Korea
