= Quang Lê =

Vietnamese singer

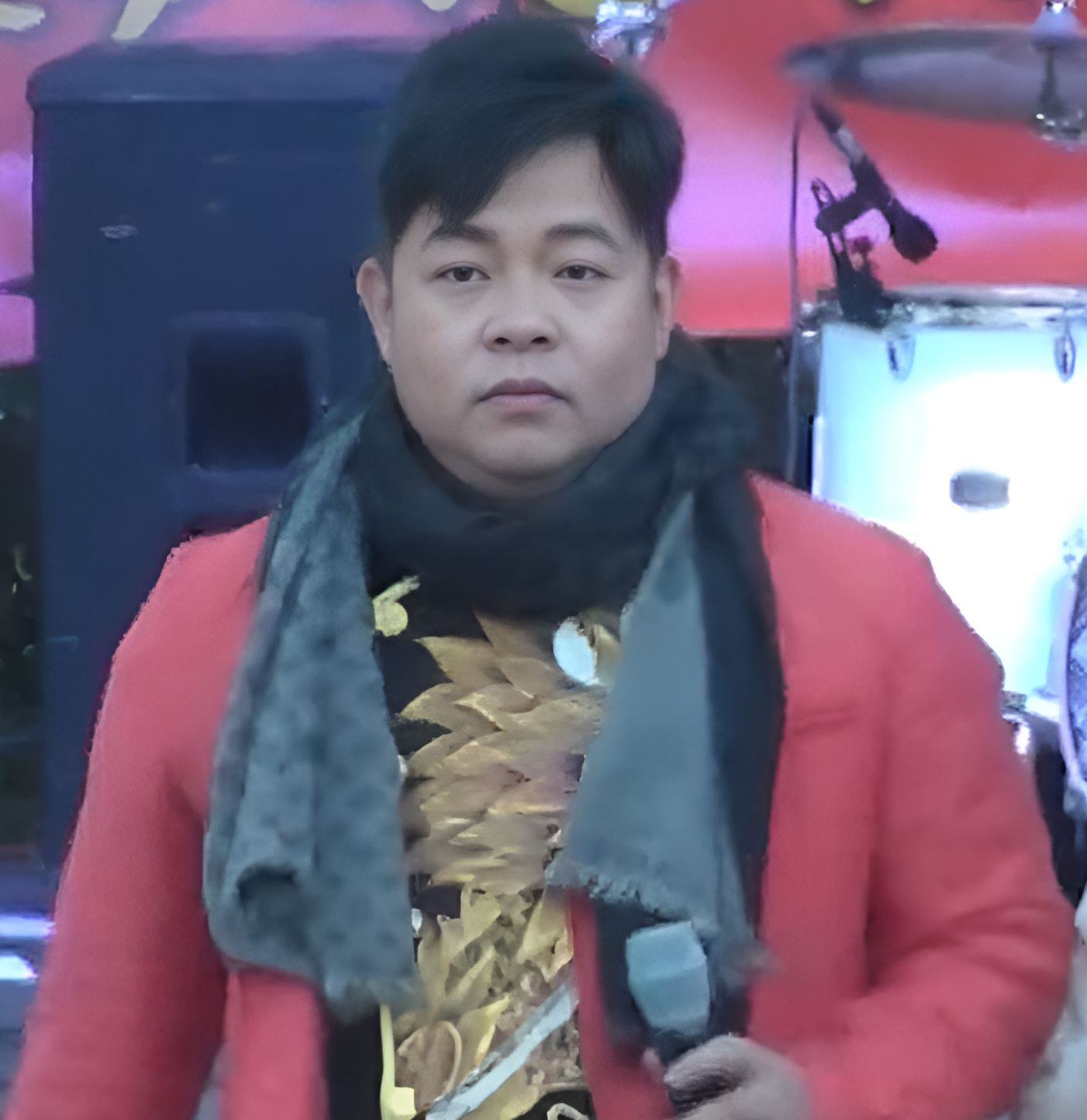
- Quang Lê in 2024

Background information
- Born: Lê Hữu Nghị; January 24, 1979 (age 47); Huế, Vietnam
- Genre: Yellow music
- Occupation: Singer
- Instrument: Vocal
- Years active: 2002–present
- Label: Thúy Nga Productions

Quang Lê (born 24 January 1979) is one of the highest-selling Vietnamese-American recording artists, renowned for his unique covers of many traditional Vietnamese songs created and written before, during and about the Vietnam War. Quang Lê has become a household name within the Vietnamese music industry worldwide, from the United States to back home in Vietnam. Quang Lê achieved success at a young age, with hits such as "Sương Trắng Miền Quê Ngoại", "Đập Vỡ Cây Đàn", "Đường Về Quê Hương" and "Tương Tư Nàng Ca Sĩ". Many famous Vietnamese songwriters, such as Đinh Miên Vũ, personally write songs for Quang Lê to perform on the Thúy Nga Paris By Night stage.

== Early life ==
Quang Lê was born in Vietnam, in the year 1975 CE, with family roots from Central Vietnam in the City of Huế. His Vietnamese accent is "Huế (central accent)," one of the main Vietnamese dialects in Vietnam, but he has the ability to imitate the southern accent, and he sings with a mixed accent. He is the third son in a family of 6 siblings, and one adopted sister. His family immigrated to the United States in 1990, and initially settled in Missouri. His family then moved to Orange County, California.

Although Quang Lê had been singing at a very young age, it wasn't until the year 2000 that Quang Lê took the step and decided to become a singer professionally.

== Singing career ==
Prior to appearing on the very popular Paris By Night stage, a musical production created by Thúy Nga Productions showcasing some of the top performers in the Vietnamese music industry, Quang Lê sang for a smaller music production called Ca Dao. He released three albums with Ca Dao singing "Quê Hương" songs such as "Ngại Ngùng", "Em Về Với Người", "Chim Sáo Ngày Xưa", "Tình Cha" and "Lối Thu Xưa". He was even given the opportunity to sing with a very famous female Vietnamese singer at the time, Phi Nhung, on two songs entitled "Ngày Đá Đơm Bông" and "Ngẫu Hứng Lý Qua Cầu".

Quang Lê had submitted a video to Thúy Nga Productions but at the time, they did need singers to perform "Quê Hương" songs. He waited two years before he received an invitation to appear in Thúy Nga's Paris by Night 66, entitled "Người Tình va Quê Hương", an opportunity that opened all doors for Quang Lê and started his journey to becoming one of the top selling artists within the Vietnamese music industry. On Paris By Night 66, Quang Lê sang "Thư Xuân Trên Rừng Cao" from songwriter Trinh Lam Ngan, and although still very young, it was his voice and his ability to perform with his "Huế" accent that the audience started to pay attention to this up and coming artist.

Quang Lê was invited again to appear on Thúy Nga's Paris By Night 68 entitled "Nửa Vầng Trăng". In this instalment, he sang alongside an alumnus of Paris By Night and another "Quê Hương" singer, Tuong Nguyen, singing a mix of songs from songwriter Duy Khánh.

Quang Lê appeared again on the Paris By Night stage in number 69 entitled "Song Ca Nợ Tình" singing "Sương Trắng Miền Quê Ngoại" by Đinh Miên Vũ. It was Quang Lê’s cover of this song that the Vietnamese community began to recognize and respect Quang Lê’s voice and abilities despite his young age. In fact, in Paris By Night 89: Live in Korea, during his interview onstage by MC Nguyễn Ngọc Ngạn, Quang Lê shared with the audience his experience meeting songwriter Đinh Miên Vũ. Miên Vũ had approached Quang Lê at one of his shows and gave Quang Lê two musical sheets he had written: one for the song “Sương Trắng Miền Quê Ngoại” and the second for a new song, “Hai Quê”. It is believed “Hai Quê” is part two of “Sương Trắng Miền Quê Ngoại” which Miên Vũ wrote and has given to Quang Lê to perform. Audience in Paris by Night 89 was treated to Quang Lê’s performance of “Hai Quê” with his Huế accent.

Quang Lê’s career began to take off, with concert and show offers pouring in for this young artist and Quang Lê became a contracted singer for Thúy Nga Productions, releasing various “Quê Hương” music albums, starting with “Sương Trắng Miền Quê Ngoại” which became the number one selling album in the same year it was released. The demand for Quang Lê began to increase, pushing Thúy Nga to also release consecutively the following solo albums from Quang Lê: “Kẻ Ở Miền Xa”, and “Xin Gọi Nhau Là Cố Nhân”.

In Paris By Night 73 entitled The Best of Song Ca (Duets), Thúy Nga decided to pair Quang Lê up with another Thúy Nga singer, Ngọc Hạ, and the audience immediately fell in love with the duet. With their Huế accents, Quang Lê and Ngọc Hạ brought the audience back to the town of Huế in the song "Ai Ra Xứ Huế" from Duy Khánh. This duet sparked more demand from the audience to see more of Quang Lê and to couple him with Ngọc Hạ. In Paris By Night 79 entitled Dream, Thúy Nga paired the two singers again in the song "Tình Lúa Duyên Trăng" from Hoai An and Ho Dinh and again in Paris By Night 94 25th Anniversary Part 1 with the song "Tình Nghèo" showcasing a much more mature Quang Lê, vocally and appearance wise.

Thúy Nga Productions made special "Xuân" (Spring) shows on the Paris by Night stage, starting with Paris By Night 76 entitled Xuân Tha Huong. In this instalment of Paris by Night, Quang Lê sang "Xuân Này Con Về Mẹ Ở Đâu", a very emotional song by Nhat Ngan. This began a series of songs for Mothers from Quang Lê on Paris By Night "Xuân" specials. In Paris By Night 80 entitled Tết Khắp Mọi Nhà, Quang Lê sang the song "Mừng Tuổi Mẹ" (Celebrating Mother's Birthdays). In Paris By Night 85, the third installment of Thúy Nga's "Xuân" specials titled "Xuân Trong Ky Niem", Quang Lê sang "Xuân Này Con Không Về".

Audience demand for Quang Lê's music continued to grow. The release of "7000 Đêm Góp Lại" introduced him to a broader audience, extending his appeal beyond older listeners. He continued to perform nhạc quê hương songs, including "Thành Phố Sau Lưng" and "Xin Em Đừng Khóc Vu Quy". He also recorded the duet "Đêm Bơ Vơ", originally performed by Duy Khánh, with fellow nhạc quê hương singer Như Quỳnh. His repertoire also included lighter and more contemporary material. He performed a cover of "Tình Nhỏ Mau Quên" with Hương Thủy, as well as a trance-influenced remix of "Xin Đừng Trách Đa Đa", which differed from his more traditional recordings. He also recorded the romantic ballad "Hãy Về Đây Bên Anh" by Duy Mạnh, further broadening his musical repertoire and attracting younger listeners.

In Paris By Night 82, Quang Lê sang "Đập Vỡ Cây Đàn" by Hoa Linh Bao and received positive feedback from the audience regarding his cover of the song, not only from the older generations, but from the younger generations as well. His performance sparked the released of his next CD, simple titled "Đập Vỡ Cây Đàn" which again has Quang Lê continuing to explore other music genres. He continued to provide to the audience with traditional Vietnamese music such as "Chuyện Ba Mùa Mưa" and "Nhật Ký Hai Đứa Mình", a romantic "Quê Hương" song loved by many from the older generation. The CD had a guest star from a very famous and beloved female artist, Minh Tuyết, who normally do not sing "Quê Hương" songs but sang "Bài Ca Kỷ Niệm" with Quang Lê. Although not a common pairing, the two singers provided a nice cover of the song. Quang Lê also duet again with Hương Thủy in another cute song called "Chuyện Tình Nơi Làng Quê" again about young love in the old country. He was also given an opportunity to duet with Quỳnh Dung, his "Godsister", whom in a previous interview he mentioned was the one person he wanted to duet with. In this CD, Quang Lê also explored a short "Tan Co" number, a traditional music genre from southern Vietnam called "Lỡ Hẹn". He also sang "Tiễn Bạn Lên Đường", a Chinese song translated into Vietnamese. He also continued to bring to the younger audience a romantic ballad in the song "Tình Em Là Đại Dương" from Duy Manh.

In Paris By Night 88, Thúy Nga decided to dedicate the show to the talented Vietnamese songwriter Lam Phuong, who has provided the Vietnamese community with a number of "Quê Hương" songs. The show was called "Đường Về Quê Hương" (Journey Back to the Countryside). Quang Lê was invited to sing the song written by Lam Phuong, with the same title as the show "Đường Về Quê Hương". In this show, performances were done live and Quang Lê, appearing more mature in a black suite, open collar and longer hair, provided a very upbeat version of the song, with vocals.

In Paris By Night 90, Thúy Nga put together a very special show dedicated to Vietnamese women. Quang Lê, alongside other singers, Khanh Ly, The Son, Tâm Đoan, Hương Thủy and Thanh Truc was part of a very special performance dedicated to all mothers, called "Lòng Mẹ Việt Nam". Quang Lê sang the song, promptly titled "Lòng Mẹ Việt Nam" which describes the pain of a mother who must see her sons off to war and longingly waits for words from them and their safe return. Quang Lê received positive feedback for his cover of this song, as he was able to pour so much emotion into the song, while maintaining very soothing and sweet vocals. In this show, Thúy Nga also paired Quang Lê with a new singer to Paris by Night, Mai Thiên Vân, in the song "Nước Non Ngàn Dặm Ra Đi". The duet proved to be a success and requests for the two to sing again was overwhelming. In Paris By Night 92 Nhạc Yêu Cầu, where the audience was able to send in requests to Thúy Nga, Quang Lê was paired up with Mai Thiên Vân again in a very adorable performance of "Gõ Cửa Trái Tim" and the audience, young and old alike immediately fell in love with the two. The two paired up again in another cute performance in Paris By Night 94 singing two songs "Áo Em Chưa Mặc Một Lần" and "Vòng Nhẫn Cưới". Using his experience on stage, Quang Lê improvised and teased Mai Thiên Vân at the end of the performance to advertise to the audience the release of the pairs’ upcoming duet album.

Quang Lê released a new album with all his greatest hits. The CD was called "Hai Quê: Platinum" and included songs sang on the Paris by Night stage including "Thư Xuân Trên Rừng Cao", "Đêm Trao Kỷ Niệm", "Hương Tóc Mạ Non" and "Cay Đắng Bờ Môi". The CD also featured other songs requested by his fans included "Mất Nhau Rồi" and "Tâm Sự Người Hát Rong". While the Paris by Night was falling in love with the Quang Lê and Mai Thiên Vân duet, his fans still loved his duets with Hương Thủy. The two again sang another song called "Nhà Anh Nhà Em" about young love back in Vietnam.

Thúy Nga decided put together a show dedicated to the three regions of Vietnam, "Huế, Saigon, Hanoi" in Paris By Night 91. Quang Lê, with a group of male singers, sang "Từ Miền Bắc" and "Vào Miền Nam" created for each region. He also sang, with singer Khánh Ly, performed a performance remembering the Massacre at Huế, called "Huế Mậu Thân". In this performance, Quang Lê provided the audience with a very moving song "Những Con Đường Trắng", of him falling in love with a local traditional Vietnamese girl and then finding her body during the massacre.

After performing with Mai Thiên Vân in Paris By Night 92, Quang Lê was given the opportunity to sing with his idol singer Y Lan in the song "Tình Hoài Hương". During the interview on stage by MC Ky Duyen, Quang Lê told the audience that singing with Y Lan was a request from him to Thúy Nga to let him sing with his Y Lan whom he has idolized for nearly 20 years. This is a clear indication of how much Thúy Nga appreciates and recognizes Quang Lê’s contribution to the Paris By Night shows.

In Paris By Night 93, Thúy Nga decided to create a show mirroring America's Dancing with the Stars. In this instalment, fans of Quang Lê saw a very different side to Quang Lê. In previous Paris By Night show, Quang Lê participated in cultural dance but not ballroom dancing. In Paris By Night 93, Quang Lê teamed up with singer/dancer Thuy Van and treated the audience to a "Rumba" dance to the song "Biển Tình". Although he received high marks from the guest judges, Quang Lê did not win the competition. It was definitely a different side to Quang Lê and surprised many of his fans.

Thúy Nga celebrated Paris By Night’s 25th anniversary with two shows: Paris By Night 94 and Paris By Night 95. While several Paris By Night singers got to sing in one song or maybe two if they are singing with other singers, Quang Lê was invited to sing in 4 songs. As previously mentioned, he sang "Tình Nghèo" with Ngọc Hạ and "Áo Em Chưa Mặc Một Lần" and "Vòng Nhẫn Cưới" with Mai Thiên Vân. He also sang in a group song with all other singers in the Paris By Night show in the song "Nếu Chỉ Còn Một Ngày". Quang Lê then treated to the audience to "Tương Tư Nàng Ca Sĩ" from Cong Thanh Bich. The success of this song spurred the release of a full album, titled "Tương Tư Nàng Ca Sĩ". The album included more songs that were requested from his fans including "Buồn Chi Em Ơi", "Em Hãy Về Đi", and a duet with Mai Thiên Vân, "Các Anh Về".

There was a lot of controversy when Quang Lê’s name was taken off of the Paris By Night 96 Nhạc Yêu Cầu 2 poster, much to the dismay of many of his fans. Thúy Nga was swarmed with mails, calls and even return of tickets for the show. Speculations that Quang Lê’s contract was over with Thúy Nga and that he would be joining Trung tâm Asia began to circulate. Many fans were not happy to hear this rumour. Quang Lê did not appear in the Paris by Night 96 show but made a surprise appearance in Paris By Night 97 singing "Huế Mù Sương". This ended any rumours of Quang Lê leaving Thúy Nga and put many hearts at ease. For the DVD release of Paris by Night 96, Thúy Nga included an MTV of Quang Lê singing "Đôi Mắt Người Xưa". Fans got to see a very romantic side of Quang Lê as he cried in the video to his ex-love on her wedding day (just all an act of course). The video also provided a promotional ad to Quang Lê’s new album with Mai Thiên Vân.

Quang Lê will appear next in Paris By Night 98, live in Las Vegas.

== Music and religion ==
Quang Lê is a devout Buddhist and performs at many temples around the world. A major event which Quang Lê frequently participates in is "Lễ Hội Quan Âm" at the Vietnamese Buddhist Temple in Houston, Texas. Quang Lê also performs at temples in France and Australia.Quang Lê was approached by Nguyen Dat, vice president of the Vietnamese Buddhist Temple to release a Buddhist CD. In early 2009, in time for Lễ Hội Quan Âm, Quang Lê, under Quang Lê Entertainment released Giọt Nước Từ Bi, an album dedicated to Quan Âm.

== Paris by Night appearances ==
Paris By Night 66: Người Tình & Quê Hương Thư Xuân Trên Rừng Cao – Quang Lê

Paris By Night 68: Nửa Vầng Trăng Liên Khúc Duy Khánh – Quang Lê, Tường Nguyên

Paris By Night 69: Song Ca Nợ Tình Sương Trắng Miền Quê Ngoại (nhạc Đinh Miên Vũ) – Quang Lê

Paris By Night 71: 20th Anniversary Kẻ Ở Miền Xa – Quang Lê

Paris By Night 72: Tiếng Hát Từ Nhịp Tim Cô Hàng Xóm – Quang Lê

Paris By Night 73: The Best Of Duets (song Ca Đặc Biệt) Ai Ra Xứ Huế – Quang Lê, Ngọc Hạ

Paris By Night 74: Hoa Bướm Ngày Xư Xin Gọi Nhau Là Cố Nhân – Quang Lê

Paris By Night 75: Về Miền Viễn Đông Đêm Trăo Kỷ Niệm – Quang Lê

Paris By Night 76: Xuân Tha Hương Xuân Này Con Về Mẹ Ở Đâu – Quang Lê

Paris By Night 77: 30 Năm Viễn Xứ Cay đắng bờ môi – Quang Lê; Lời cảm ơn – Hợp Ca Kết Thúc

Paris By Night 78: Ðường Xưa Hương Giang Còn Tôi Chờ – Quang Lê

Paris By Night 79: Dreams Tình Lúa Duyên Trăng – Quang Lê, Ngọc Hạ

Paris By Night 80: Tết Khắp Mọi Nhà Mừng Tuổi Mẹ – Quang Lê

Paris By Night 81: Âm Nhạc Không Biên Giới 2 Chuyện Một Chiếc Cầu Đã Gẫy – Quang Lê

Paris By Night 82: Tiếu Vương Hội Đập Vỡ Cây Đàn – Quang Lê

Paris By Night 83: Những Khúc Hát Ân Tình Về Dưới Mái Nhà – Trần Thái Hòa, Quang Lê, Thế Sơn; Hương Tóc Mạ Non – Quang Lê, Hà Phương; Hãy Về Đây Bên Anh – Quang Lê

Paris By Night 84: In Atlanta Âm Nhạc Và Thời Trang Áo Hoa – Như Quỳnh, Quang Lê

Paris By Night 85: Xuân Trong Kỷ Niệm Xuân Nghệ Sĩ Hành Khúc – Nguyễn Hưng, Thế Sơn, Quang Lê, Trần Thái Hòa, Lương Tùng Quang; Xuân Này Con Không Về – Quang Lê

Paris By Night 88: Đường Về Quê Hương – Lam Phươn Đường Về Quê Hương – Quang Lê

Paris By Night 89: In Korea Hai Quê – Quang Lê

Paris By Night 90: Chân Dung Người Phụ Nữ Việt Nam Nước Non Ngàn Dặm Ra Đi – Quang Lê, Mai Thiên Vân; Nhạc Kịch: Bà Mẹ Quê, Lòng Mẹ Việt Nam, Lời Dặn Dò Của Mẹ – Tâm Đoan, Hương Thủy, Thanh Trúc, Michelle Nguyễn, Quang Lê, Khánh Ly, Thế Sơn

Paris By Night 91: Huế – Sài Gòn – Hà Nội Từ Miền Bắc – Quỳnh Vi, Thế Sơn, Bằng Kiều, Quang Lê, Trần Thái Hòa, Dương Triều Vũ, Trịnh Lam; Nhạc Kịch "Huế Mậu Thân": Những Con Đường Trắng & Bài Ca Dành Cho Những Xác Người – Quang Lê, Khánh Ly; Vào Miền Nam – Hương Thủy, Thế Sơn, Quang Lê, Lưu Việt Hùng, Nguyễn Hoàng Nam

Paris By Night 92: Nhạc Yêu Cầu Gõ Cửa Trái Tim – Quang Lê, Mai Thiên Vân; Tình Hoài Hương – Ý Lan, Quang Lê

Paris By Night 93: Celebrity Dancing Rumba: Biển Tình – Quang Lê

Paris By Night 94: 25th Anniversary Tình Nghèo – Ngọc Hạ, Quang Lê; Áo Em Chưa Mặc Một Lần & Vòng Nhẫn Cưới – Mai Thiên Vân, Quang Lê

Paris By Night 95: 25th Anniversary – Cám Ơn Cuộc Đời Nếu Chỉ Còn Một Ngày – Hop Ca; Tương Tư Nàng Ca Sĩ – Quang Lê

Paris By Night 96: Nhạc Yêu Cầu 2 Đôi Mắt Người Xưa – Quang Lê

Paris By Night 97: Celebrity Dancing 2 Huế Mù Sương – Quang Lê

Paris By Night 98: Fly With Us to Las Vegas Nhớ Nhau Hoài – Quang Lê

Paris By Night 99: Tôi Là Người Việt Nam Tình Ca – Như Quỳnh, Mai Thiên Vân, Ngọc Anh, Nguyệt Anh, Thế Sơn, Trần Thái Hòa, Quang Lê, Trịnh Lam, Hương Giang, Hương Thủy, Quỳnh Vi, Hồ Lệ Thu; Người Em Vỹ Dạ – Quang Lê

Paris By Night 100: Ghi Nhớ Một Chặng Đường Chuyện Tình Buồn 100 Năm – Mai Thiên Vân & Quang Lê

Paris By Night 100 V.I.P. Party Mưa Đêm Ngoại Ô (Đỗ Kim Bảng) – Quang Lê

Paris By Night 101: Hạnh Phúc Đầu Năm Bài Ca Tết Cho Em – Quang Lê

Paris By Night 102: Nhạc Yêu Cầu – Tình Ca Lam Phương Xin Thời Gian Qua Mau – Quang Lê

Paris By Night 103: Tình Sử Trong Âm nhạc Việt Nam Hai Chuyến Tàu Đêm – Quang Lê

Paris By Night 104: Beginnings Ngày Xưa Anh Nói – Quang Lê, Mai Thiên Vân

Paris By Night 106: Lụa Trời Huế vào thu chưa em – Quang Lê, Như Quỳnh

Paris By Night 107: Nguyễn Ngọc Ngạn – 20 Năm Sân Khấu Chiều xuân xa nhà – Quang Lê

Paris By Night 108: Time Đường Xưa Lối Cũ – Quang Lê

Paris By Night 109: 30th Anniversary Celebration Duyên quê – Ngọc Hạ, Quang Lêc

Paris By Night 109 V.I.P. Party Chuyện ba người (Quốc Dũng) – Quang Lê

Paris By Night 110: Phát Lộc Đầu Năm Mùa Xuân Của Mẹ – Quang Lê

Paris By Night 111: S Sao Anh Nỡ Đành Quên – Quang Lê, Lam Anh Áo Hoa (Trần Quang Lộc) – Quang Lê

Paris By Night 112: Đông Chuyện người đan áo – Quang Lê

Paris By Night Gloria 2 Tà Áo Đêm Noel – Quang Lê

== Albums with Ca Dao ==
=== Huế Đêm Trăng ===
Huế Đêm Trăng – Quang Lê
Ngại Ngùng – Quang Lê
Giọt Sầu Trinh Nữ

m – Quang Lê
Huế Thương – Quang Lê
Thương Về Miền Trung
Ước Thầm – Quang Lê
Tiếng Hát Chim Đa Đa – Quang Lê
Quê Hương Ngày Em Lớn
Lặng Thầm

=== Em Ve Voi Nguoi ===
Em Ve Voi Nguoi – Quang Lê
Mua Xuân Do Co Em
Gian Hon – Quang Lê
Ngheo
Chan Que – Quang Lê
Tren Bon Vung Chien Thuat
Mua Bong Bong – Quang Lê
Dem Tren Dinh Sau
Huong Cua – Quang Lê
Ngay Con Em Ben Toi

=== Chim Sáo Ngày Xưa ===
Lối Thu Xưa – Quang Lê
Dang Dở – Quang Lê
Ngày Đã Đơm Bông – Quang Lê, Phi Nhung
Tình Cha – Quang Lê
Yêu Trong Nghịch Cảnh – Quang Lê
Gõ Cửa Trái Tim – Quang Lê
Nàng Yêu Hoa Tím – Quang Lê
Chuyện Ba Người – Quang Lê
Chim Sáo Ngày Xưa – Quang Lê

== Solo albums with Thúy Nga ==
=== Sương Trắng Miền Quê Ngoại ===
Sương Trắng Miền Quê Ngoại (Đinh Miên Vũ) – Quang Lê
Những Ngày Xưa Thân Ái (Phạm Thế Mỹ) – Quang Lê
Gặp Nhau (Hoàng Thi Thơ) – Quang Lê
Ai Nhớ Chăng Ai (Hoàng Thi Thơ) – Quang Lê
Thư Cho Vợ Hiền (Song Ngọc) – Quang Lê
Sao Em Vô Tình – Quang Lê
Người Mang Tâm Sự (Như Phy) – Quang Lê
Tà Áo Cưới (Hoàng Thi Thơ) – Quang Lê
Duyên Kiếp (Diên An) – Quang Lê
Thương Về Miền Trung (Duy Khánh) – Quang Lê
Đa Tạ (Anh Việt Thu) – Quang Lê

=== Kẻ Ở Miền Xa ===
Kẻ Ở Miền Xa – Quang Lê
Chuyện Ngày Cuối Năm – Quang Lê
Chuyện Tình Sông Thương – Quang Lê
Giận Hờn 2 – Quang Lê
Người Phu Kéo Mo Cau – Quang Lê
Huế Tình Yêu Của Tôi – Quang Lê
Tiếng Hai Đêm – Quang Lê
Buồn Trong Kỷ Niệm – Quang Lê
Mèo Hoang – Quang Lê
Một Lần Dang Dở – Quang Lê

=== Xin Gọi Nhau Là Cố Nhân ===
Cầu Tre Kỷ Niệm – Quang Lê
Mưa Đêm Tỉnh Nhỏ – Quang Lê
Đêm Cuối – Quang Lê
Để Trả Lời Một Câu Hỏi – Quang Lê, Như Quỳnh
Cô Hàng Xóm – Quang Lê
Nước Trôi Qua Ghềnh – Quang Lê
Ai Ra Xứ Huế – Quang Lê, Ngọc Hạ
Nắng Đẹp Miền Nam – Quang Lê
Xin Gọi Nhau Là Cố Nhân – Quang Lê
Kẻ Đi Rong – Quang Lê
Nhớ Về Em – Quang Lê
Nén Hương Yêu – Quang Lê

=== 7000 Ðêm Góp Lại ===
Xin Em Đừng Khóc Vu Quy – Quang Lê
7000 Đêm Góp Lại – Quang Lê
Hận Tha La – Quang Lê
Đêm Bơ Vơ – Quang Lê, Như Quỳnh
Tình Em Là Biển Rộng Sông Dài – Quang Lê
Sao Em Nở Vô Tình – Quang Lê
Tình Nhỏ Mau Quên – Quang Lê, Hương Thủy Vùng Quê Tương Lai – Quang Lê
Xuân Này Con Về Mẹ Ở Đâu – Quang Lê
Thành Phố Sau Lưng – Quang Lê
Hãy Về Đây Bên Anh – Quang Lê
Xin Đừng Trách Đa Đa – Quang Lê

=== Đập Vỡ Cây Đàn ===
Đập Vỡ Cây Đàn – Quang Lê – Hoa Linh Bảo
Đừng Nhắc Chuyện Lòng – Quang Lê – Vinh Sử
Chuyện Ba Mùa Mưa – Quang Lê – Minh Kỳ, Dạ Cầm
Bài Ca Kỷ Niệm – Quang Lê, Minh Tuyết – Tứ Nhi, Bằng Giang
Đau Xót Lý Con Cua – Quang Lê, Quỳnh Dung – Minh Vy
Lỡ Hẹn – Quang Lê – Hồng Xương Long, Minh Châu
Tình Em Xứ Quảng – Quang Lê – Trần Ngọc
Chuyện Tình Nơi Làng Quê – Quang Lê, Hương Thủy – Xuân Hòa, Quang Vinh
Nhật Ký Hai Đứa Mình – Quang Lê – Lê Minh Bằng
Cánh Thư Bằng Hữu – Quang Lê – Hoài Linh
Tiễn Bạn Lên Đường – Quang Lê – Nhạc Hoa
Tình Em Là Đại Dương – Quang Lê – Duy Mạnh

=== Hai Quê ===
Hai Quê – Quang Lê
Nước Non Ngàn Dặm Ra Đi – Quang Lê, Mai Thiên Vân
Chuyện Một Chiếc Cầu Đã Gãy – Quang Lê
Thu Xuân Trên Rừng Cao – Quang Lê
Tình Lúa Duyên Trăng – Quang Lê, Ngọc Hạ
Đêm Trao Kỷ Niệm – Quang Lê
Cay Đắng Bờ Môi – Quang Lê
Áo Hoa – Quang Lê, Như Quỳnh
Tâm Sự Người Hát Rong – Quang Lê
Giọt Lệ Đài Trang – Quang Lê
Mất Nhau Rồi – Quang Lê
Hương Tóc Mạ Non – Quang Lê, Hà Phương
Đường Về Quê Hương – Quang Lê
Nhà Anh Nhà Em – Quang Lê, Hương Thủy

=== Tương Tư Nàng Ca Sĩ ===
Tương Tư Nàng Ca Sĩ – Quang Lê
Giã Từ – Quang Lê
Hãy Quên Anh – Quang Lê
Em Hãy Về Đi – Quang Lê
Ngại Ngùng – Quang Lê
Nữa Vầng Trăng – Quang Lê
Các Anh Về – Quang Lê, Mai Thiên Vân
Quán Nữa Khuya – Quang Lê
Buồn Chi Em Ơi – Quang Lê
Neo Đậu Bến Quê – Quang Lê
Hoa Cài Mái Tóc – Quang Lê
