= Paris by Night 95 =

Paris By Night 25th Anniversary (Part II): Cám Ơn Cuộc Ðời
- Paris by Night episode
- Poster for PBN 95
- Episode no.: Episode 95
- Directed by: Alan Carter
- Masters of ceremonies: Nguyễn Ngọc Ngạn; Nguyễn Cao Kỳ Duyên; Trinh Hoi
- Filmed at: Long Beach, California
- Filmed on: September 21, 2008
- Venue: Terrace Theater
- Executive producers: Marie To; Paul Huynh
- Format: 2-Disc DVD
- Release date: January 22, 2009

Paris By Night 95: 25th Anniversary - Cám Ơn Cuộc Ðời (25th Anniversary - Thank You, Life!) is a Paris By Night program produced by Thúy Nga Productions that was filmed at the Terrace Theater at the Long Beach Convention and Entertainment Center on September 21, 2008.

The program is the second part of a 2-part program produced by Thúy Nga to celebrate the 25th anniversary of the reestablishment of Thúy Nga overseas.

== Track list ==
DISK 1

1. Nếu Chỉ Còn Một Ngày... – Bằng Kiều, Thế Sơn, Don Hồ, Trần Thái Hòa, Khánh Ly, Quang Lê, Mai Thiên Vân, Khánh Hà, Hương Thủy, Hồ Lệ Thu, Minh Tuyết, Trúc Lam, Trúc Linh, Tú Quyên, Dương Triệu Vũ, Quỳnh Vi, Ngọc Liên, Lương Tùng Quang, Lưu Việt Hùng, Nguyệt Anh, Hương Giang
2. Hãy Cứ Là Tình Nhân – Ý Lan
3. Video clip: "Nguyễn Ngọc Ngạn, Kỳ Duyên in Paris"
4. Tân Cổ: Nếu Chúng Mình Cách Trở – Phi Nhung, Mạnh Quỳnh
5. Những Ngày Mưa Gió & Nỗi Nhớ Dịu Êm – Như Loan, Nguyệt Anh
6. Phỏng Vấn Hậu Trường (Makeup) - Trịnh Hội
7. Thiên Đường Cô Đơn – Lưu Bích
8. Một Người Đi – Hoàng Oanh
9. Phỏng Vấn Hậu Trường (Hair) - Trịnh Hội
10. Video clip: "Nguyễn Ngọc Ngạn, Kỳ Duyên - Đời không như là mơ"
11. Dòng Sông Xanh – Ngọc Hạ
12. Phỏng Vấn Hậu Trường - Trịnh Hội
13. Đời Tôi Chỉ Một Người – Thế Sơn
14. Cỏ Úa & Như Giấc Chiêm Bao – Ngọc Liên, Thanh Hà
15. Interview Paris By Night fan Kenny Bùi
16. Đừng Giấu Trong Lòng – Minh Tuyết, Nguyễn Thắng
17. Phỏng Vấn Paris by Night Dancers - Trịnh Hội
18. Lâu Đài Tình Ái – Khánh Ly, Nguyễn Ngọc Ngạn
19. Video clip: "Kỳ Duyên - đánh lừa dư luận"
20. Mây Khói – Trịnh Lam
21. Video clip: "Viet Directors"
22. Phỏng vấn Tim Bùi, Hàm Trần, Stephane Gauger

DISK 2

1. Skit: Về Quê Xưa – Chí Tài, Việt Hương, Hoài Tâm, Nguyễn Huy
2. Phỏng vấn Hương Thủy & Christian Baerens
3. Musical: Cho Người Tôi Yêu (Bức Thư Tình Đầu Tiên, Ngày Cưới, Ngày Tân Hôn) - Bằng Kiều, Quỳnh Vi
4. Phỏng Vấn Nhạc Sĩ Thanh Sơn
5. Xin Còn Gọi Tên Nhau – Trần Thái Hòa
6. Phỏng Vấn Nhạc Sĩ Lê Dinh
7. Nếu Anh Đừng Hẹn – Mai Thiên Vân
8. Phỏng Vấn Hậu Trường (Video Truck) - Trịnh Hội
9. Đừng Lừa Dối – Dương Triệu Vũ
10. Tương Tư Nàng Ca Sĩ – Quang Lê
11. Video clip: "Điệp Vụ Trong Sa Mạc"
12. Khi Xưa Ta Bé – Mai Tiến Dũng, Hương Giang
13. Phỏng vấn Bảo Hân
14. Liên Khúc Chỉ Riêng Mình Ta & Khổ Vì Yêu Nàng – Nguyễn Hưng, Thùy Vân
15. Video clip: "Trở Về Quá Khứ/Back To The Past"
16. Ra Ngõ Mà Yêu – Trần Thu Hà
17. LK Nhạt Nắng & Biển Nhớ – Minh Tuyết, Tú Quyên, Quỳnh Vi, Trúc Lam, Trúc Linh, Ngọc Liên, Hương Thủy, Như Loan, Bảo Hân, Thùy Vân, Hồ Lệ Thu, Thanh Hà, Nguyệt Anh, Lynda Trang Đài
18. Finale
  - Behind the Scenes
  - Bonus MTV : Huyết Lệ – Hồ Lệ Thu

Preceded by Paris by Night 94: Paris By Night 25th Anniversary (Part I)	Paris By Night; Paris by Night 95: Paris By Night 25th Anniversary (Part II) - Cám Ơn Cuộc Ðời	Succeeded by Paris by Night 96: Nhac Yeu Cau 2
