= Paris by Night 90 =

Chân Dung Người Phụ Nữ Việt Nam
- Paris by Night episode
- Poster for PBN 90
- Episode no.: Episode 90
- Directed by: Alan Carter
- Masters of ceremonies: Nguyễn Ngọc Ngạn; Nguyễn Cao Kỳ Duyên
- Filmed at: Long Beach, California
- Filmed on: September 15, 2007 & September 16, 2007
- Venue: Terrace Theater
- Executive producers: Marie To; Paul Huynh
- Format: 2-Disc DVD
- Release date: December 13, 2007

Paris By Night 90: Chân Dung Người Phụ Nữ Việt Nam (The Portrait of a Vietnamese Woman) is a Paris By Night program produced by Thúy Nga that was filmed at the Terrace Theater at the Long Beach Convention and Entertainment Center on September 15, 2007 and September 16, 2007.

The program was inspired by the conceptual idea of Tô Văn Lai and Nguyễn Ngọc Ngạn to honor the sacrifice and endurance that Vietnamese women experience being a mother and a wife of the family as well as an ordinary citizen in times of war (Vietnam War) and peace. The program features songs, musicals, as well as skits that poignantly portray the significant role that Vietnamese women holds in all aspects of life throughout the years. From songs such as “Bốn Mắt Anh Yêu” and “Cô Bắc Kì Nho Nhỏ” that lively evoke the teenage pureness & innocence during high school years to more mature songs like “Mười Thương” that describes the softness and inner beauty of the Vietnamese woman. On the other hand, "Mẹ Trùng Dương" and "Mẹ Việt Nam Ơi!" metaphorically compare the woman to the ocean whom protects and gives shelters to the land of Vietnam while "Cô Gái Việt" depicts the social contribution of the women in the society besides family matters.

Several guests were also presented on the show. An introductory speech was presented by Congresswoman Loretta Sanchez, discussing the resilience, strength, care and contributions of the Vietnamese woman in Vietnam and abroad; as well, she wore the traditional Vietnamese dress, an ao dai. Other guests included Swiss philanthropist "Tim" Aline Rebeaud, who runs an orphanage for handicapped and orphaned children in Saigon, named Maison Chance, and others.

== Track list ==
Disc 1

1. Mẹ Trùng Dương, Mẹ Việt Nam Ơi!, Cô Gái Việt - Ý Lan, Khánh Ly, Họa Mi, Khánh Hà, Hoàng Oanh, Minh Tuyết, Ngọc Liên, Tú Quyên, Thanh Trúc, Như Loan, Bảo Hân, Hồ Lệ Thu, Quỳnh Vi, Hương Giang, Loan Châu, Hương Thủy, Tâm Đoan

2. Nước Non Ngàn Dặm Ra Đi - Quang Lê, Mai Thiên Vân

3. Chị Tôi - Bằng Kiều

4. Cô Hàng Nước - Trần Thái Hòa

5. Thân Phận & Được Tin Em Lấy Chồng - Quỳnh Dung, Mai Quốc Huy

6. Ru Con Tình Củ - Khánh Hà

7. Vọng Cổ: Thiếu Phụ Nam Xương - Mạnh Quỳnh, Hương Thủy

8. Thoi Tơ & Bến Nước Tình Quê - Loan Châu, Thanh Trúc

9. Thương Đời Hoa - Hồ Lệ Thu

10. Cô Thắm Về Làng - Thế Sơn, Trịnh Lam, Tiến Dũng

11. Em Ghen - Bảo Hân, Tú Quyên, Như Loan

12. Người Yêu Của Lính - Hoàng Oanh

13. Tưởng Như Còn Người Yêu - Ý Lan

14. Mười Thương - Tâm Đoan

Disc 2

15. Hài Kịch: Chồng Chúa Vợ Tôi - Kiều Oanh, Kiều Linh, Ngọc Đan Thanh, & Lê Tín

16. Bốn Mắt Anh Yêu & Cô Bắc Kỳ Nho Nhỏ - Lương Tùng Quang, Dương Triệu Vũ

17. Gánh Hàng Rong - Minh Tuyết

18. Giọt Nước Mắt Ngà & Trả Lại Anh - Ngọc Liên, Hương Giang

19. Nhạc Kịch: Bà Mẹ Quê, Lòng Mẹ Việt Nam, Lời Dặn Dò Của Mẹ - Tâm Đoan, Hương Thủy, Thanh Trúc, Michelle Nguyễn, Quang Lê, Khánh Ly, Thế Sơn

20. Tiển Bước Sang Ngang - Nguyễn Hưng

21. Một Mình - Trần Thu Hà

22. Mẹ Yêu - Trịnh Lam, Lưu Bích

23. Ai Xuôi Vạn Lý - Họa Mi

24. Trăng Sáng Vườn Chè - Quỳnh Vi

Preceded by Paris By Night 89: In Korea	Paris By Night; Paris By Night 90: Chân Dung Người Phụ Nữ Việt Nam	Succeeded by Paris By Night 91: Huế, Sài Gòn, Hà Nội
