= Paris by Night 91 =

Huế, Sài Gòn, Hà Nội
- Paris by Night episode
- Poster for PBN 91
- Episode no.: Episode 91
- Directed by: Michael Watt
- Masters of ceremonies: Nguyễn Ngọc Ngạn; Nguyễn Cao Kỳ Duyên
- Filmed at: Long Beach, California
- Filmed on: January 12, 2008 & January 13, 2008
- Venue: Terrace Theater
- Executive producers: Marie Tô; Paul Huỳnh
- Format: 2-Disc DVD
- Release date: March 27, 2008

Paris By Night 91: Huế, Sài Gòn, Hà Nội (Huế - Saigon - Hanoi) is a Paris By Night program produced by Thúy Nga that was filmed at the Terrace Theater at the Long Beach Convention and Entertainment Center on January 12, 2008 and January 13, 2008.

== Concept ==
The program features songs, musicals and as well as a skit that characterize the three main cities of Vietnam, which are Huế, Sài Gòn and Hà Nội. Each city represents its respective region of the country. Hà Nội represents the North Vietnam. Huế represents the Central Vietnam. Sài Gòn represents the South Vietnam. Each city carries its own tradition as well as characteristics that set it apart from one another. As a whole, the cultures of Huế, Sài Gòn and Hà Nội complement each other to visualize a complete Việt Nam. The musical “Huế Mậu Thân” poignantly depicts the Massacre at Huế perpetrated by the communists in 1968 during the Tet Offensive.

Special guests included Hưng Huỳnh, who was the winner of Top Chef Season 3), Khải (a Dutch Pennsylvanian who spoke Vietnamese), Deputy Director Hồ Văn Kỳ Thoại (Phó Đề Đốc Hồ Văn Kỳ Thoại), and Former Deputy Nguyễn Lý Tưởng (Cựu Dân Biểu Nguyễn Lý Tưởng).

== Track list ==
=== Disc 1 ===
1. Opening Clip (Phần Mở Đầu): Từ Miền Bắc
2. Trích Đoạn: "Con Đường Cái Quan: Từ Miền Bắc" (Phạm Duy) – Thế Sơn, Bằng Kiều, Quang Lê, Trần Thái Hòa, Dương Triệu Vũ & Trịnh Lam, Quỳnh Vi
3. Giấc Mơ Hồi Hương (Vũ Thành) – Khánh Hà
4. Hà Nội Ngày Trở Về (Phú Quang, Lời: Doãn Thanh Tùng & Phú Quang) – Quang Dũng
5. Em Đi Chùa Hương (Trung Đức & Thơ: Nguyễn Nhược Pháp) – Tú Quyên & Thanh Trúc
6. Hà Nội Mùa Vắng Những Cơn Mưa (Trương Quý Hải, Thơ: Bùi Thanh Tuấn) – Thế Sơn
7. Video Clip: Nhạc Sĩ Hoàng Dương
8. Hướng Về Hà Nội (Hoàng Dương) – Thu Phương
9. Em Ơi Hà Nội Phố (Phú Quang, phỏng thơ: Phan Vũ) - Bằng Kiều
10. Phỏng Vấn: Mr. Khải
11. Video Clip: Qua Miền Trung
12. Trích Đoạn: "Con Đường Cái Quan: Qua Miền Trung" (Phạm Duy) – Trần Thái Hòa, Dương Triệu Vũ, Trịnh Lam, Nguyễn Hoàng Nam, Lưu Việt Hùng, & Mai Thiên Vân
13. Tâm Tình Gửi Huế (Tôn Nữ Trà Mi & Hoàng Thi Thơ) – Họa Mi & Trở Về Huế (Văn Phụng) – Ý Lan
14. Bao Giờ Em Quên (Duy Khánh) – Mai Quốc Huy
15. Thương Về Xứ Huế (Minh Kỳ) – Hoàng Oanh & Hà Thanh
16. Phỏng Vấn: Mai Thiên Vân
17. Tiếng Sông Hương (Phạm Đinh Chương) – Mai Thiên Vân
18. Video Clip: Nhạc Sĩ Châu Kỳ
19. Trở Về (Châu Kỳ) – Trần Thái Hòa
20. Video Clip: Nhạc Sĩ Thăng Long
21. Quen Nhau Trên Đường Về (Thăng Long) – Quỳnh Dung & Duy Trường
22. Phỏng Vấn: Cựu Dân Biểu Nguyễn Lý Tưởng

=== Disc 2 ===
1. Giới Thiệu Nhạc Kịch: "Huế Mậu Thân"
2. Nhạc Kịch: "Huế Mậu Thân"
  1. Những Con Đường Trắng (Trầm Tử Thiêng & Tô Kiều Ngân) – Quang Lê
  2. Bài Ca Dành Cho Những Xác Người (Trịnh Công Sơn) – Khánh Ly
3. Phỏng Vấn (interview): Phó Đề Đốc Hồ Văn Kỳ Thoại
4. Hài Kịch: Chung Một Mái Nhà – Chí Tài, Hương Thủy, Bé Ti & Uyên Chi
5. Video Clip: Top Chef Hưng Huỳnh
6. Phỏng Vấn: Top Chef Hưng Huỳnh
7. Video Clip: Vào Miền Nam
8. Trích Đoạn: "Con Đường Cái Quan: Vào Miền Nam" – Hương Thủy, Thế Sơn, Quang Lê, Nguyễn Hoàng Nam, & Lưu Việt Hùng
9. Video Clip: Soạn Giả Viễn Châu
10. Tân Cổ: Tiếng Hò Miền Nam (Tân Nhạc: Phạm Duy & Cổ Nhạc: Viễn Châu) – Hương Lan & Minh Vương
11. Đêm Đô Thị (Y Vân) & Sài Gòn (Y Vân) – Bảo Hân, Hồ Lệ Thu & Thùy Vân
12. Phỏng Vấn: Mr. Khải
13. Bước Chân Chiều Chủ Nhật (Đỗ Kim Bảng) – Ngọc Liên & Đêm Lang Thang (Vinh Sử) – Dương Trieu Vu
14. Sài Gòn Niềm Thương Nỗi Nhớ (Nhạc: Võ Tá Hân & Thơ: Trần Ngọc) – Trịnh Lam
15. Giòng An Giang (Anh Việt Thu) – Quỳnh Vi & Nguyệt Ánh
16. Phỏng Vấn: Bằng Kiều
17. Sài Gòn Chiều Bơ Vơ © (Thái Thịnh) – Minh Tuyết
18. Tự Tình Quê Hương © (Nhật Ngân & Trịnh Việt Cường) – Tâm Đoan
19. Tôi Yêu (Trịnh Hưng) – Hồ Lệ Thu, Thanh Trúc & Như Loan
20. Finale
- Bonus video: Huế Mậu Thân
- Hậu Trường Sân Khấu (Behind The Scenes)

Preceded by Paris By Night 90: Chân Dung Người Phụ Nữ Việt Nam	Paris By Night; Paris By Night 91: Huế, Sài Gòn, Hà Nội	Succeeded by Paris By Night 92: Nhạc Yêu Cầu
