= Paris by Night 89 =

In Korea
- Paris by Night episode
- Poster for PBN 89
- Episode no.: Episode 89
- Directed by: Seounghyun Oh
- Masters of ceremonies: Nguyễn Ngọc Ngạn; Nguyễn Cao Kỳ Duyên
- Filmed at: Seoul, South Korea
- Filmed on: July 1, 2007
- Venue: Olympic Fencing Gymnasium; Olympic Park, Bangi-dong, Songpa District, Seoul
- Executive producers: Marie To; Paul Huynh
- Format: 2-Disc DVD
- Release date: August 30, 2007

Paris By Night 89: In Korea is a Paris By Night program that was filmed at the Olympic Fencing Gymnasium (now SK Olympic Handball Gymnasium) at the Olympic Park in Seoul, South Korea on Sunday, July 1, 2007. It is Thúy Nga's first venture into Asia to tape a Paris By Night program. Thúy Nga chose to tape at South Korea, rather than any other country in Asia, simply because of the popularity of Korean actors and singers to the Vietnamese community. The program is directed by a Korean director, Seounghyun Oh. It is Thúy Nga's fourth "Live" show.

The venue, the Olympic Fencing Gymnasium (or the Olympic Fencing Stadium), is one of Thúy Nga's biggest stages to date. Seating about 6,350 people, the audience consists normally of native Vietnamese people who travelled directly from Thúy Nga's native country of Vietnam. The audience also includes those who participated in Thúy Nga's first-ever Summer Asia Tour, sponsored directly by Thúy Nga. The tour is about a week long and provides tickets to the taping of this show. The venue features two stages and is one of Thúy Nga's biggest shows of this year.

The program also features models from both Vietnamese and South Korean actresses and models. At the end of the program, the DVD features the hosts, Nguyễn Ngọc Ngạn and Nguyễn Cao Kỳ Duyên, documenting Vietnamese refugee life in South Korea after the Fall of Saigon.

== Track list ==
Disc 1

1. Đừng Hứa Với Em - Minh Tuyết
2. Bao Giờ Em Mới Hiểu? - Trịnh Lam
3. Nửa Hồn Thương Đau - Ý Lan
4. Đường Vào Yêu - Thủy Tiên
5. Xót Xa - Mai Quốc Huy
6. Phỏng Vấn Mai Quốc Huy (Interview)
7. Superstar - Vân Quỳnh, Hương Giang
8. Thiên Đàng Đánh Mất - Dương Triệu Vũ
9. Tân Cổ : Bạc Trắng Lửa Hồng - Hương Thủy, Mạnh Quỳnh
10. Hai Quê - Quang Lê
11. Phỏng Vấn Quang Lê
12. Thôi Nhớ Mong Mà Chi - Bảo Hân
13. Phỏng vấn Khánh Ly (Interview)
14. Hoa Vàng Mấy Độ - Khánh Ly
15. Hạ Trắng - Trần Thái Hòa
16. Clip : Nguồn Gốc Họ Lý Hoa Sơn - Korea
17. Phỏng Vấn Trưởng Hậu Duệ Nhà Họ Lý
18. Tan Biến (Gone) - Huỳnh Gia Tuấn, Roni Trọng
19. Hài Kịch : Giọt Lệ Ðài Trang - Hoài Linh, Chí Tài, Hữu Lộc

Phóng sự Ðặc Biệt Tại Ðại Hàn Với Nguyễn Ngọc Ngạn & Nguyễn Cao Kỳ Duyên:

- Tiến sĩ Yeon Kwan Park
- Những Mảnh Ðời Buồn Vui...
- Linh mục Phạm Thanh Bình

Disc 2

1. Liên Khúc : Gió Bắc & Lý Con Sáo Bạc Liêu - Tâm Ðoan, Hương Lan
2. Em Vẫn Tin - Hồ Lệ Thu
3. Mưa Trên Quê Hương - Như Quỳnh
4. Clip : Thuyền Trưởng Jeon Je Yong Cứu Thuyền Nhân Việt Nam
5. Vinh Danh Thuyền Trưởng Jeon Je Yong
6. Cơn Đau Cuối Cùng - Lương Tùng Quang
7. Phỏng vấn Lương Tùng Quang (Interview)
8. Yêu Để Rồi Biết Xót Xa - David Meng
9. Yêu Anh Thật Khó Nói - Như Loan, Loan Châu
10. Phỏng vấn Như Loan, Loan Châu
11. Mộng Sầu - Khánh Hà
12. Linh Hồn Đã Mất - Bằng Kiều
13. Phỏng vấn Bằng Kiều (Interview)
14. Trình Diễn Áo Dài Calvin Hiệp (8 Người Mẫu Việt Nam) & Thái Nguyễn (8 Người Mẫu Ðại Hàn) / Nhạc Nền : Ảo Ảnh - Trần Thu Hà
15. Hoa Nắng - Sunny Lương, Mai Tiến Dũng
16. Hoang Vu - Thế Sơn
17. Tình Chấp Nhận - Quỳnh Vi
18. Khi Anh Ra Đi - Lưu Bích
19. Finale

Bonus MTV :

1. Nếu Em Ðược Chọn Lựa - Ngọc Liên
2. Chuyện Ngày Thơ - Hà Phương
3. Em Vẫn Tin - Hồ Lệ Thu

Preceded by Paris By Night 88: Lam Phương - Đường Về Quê Hương	Paris By Night; Paris By Night 89: In Korea	Succeeded by Paris By Night 90: Chân Dung Người Phụ Nữ Việt Nam
