= Paris by Night 93 =

Celebrity Dancing - Khiêu Vũ Của Các Ngôi Sao
- Paris by Night episode
- Poster for PBN 93
- Episode no.: Episode 93
- Directed by: Alan Carter
- Masters of ceremonies: Nguyễn Cao Kỳ Duyên; Nguyen Van Thinh
- Filmed at: Buena Park, California
- Filmed on: May 14, 2008
- Venue: Charles M. Schulz Theatre, Knott's Berry Farm
- Executive producers: Marie To; Paul Huynh
- Format: 2-Disc DVD
- Release date: August 29, 2008

Paris by Night 93: Celebrity Dancing - Khiêu Vũ Của Các Ngôi Sao is a Paris by Night program produced by Thuy Nga that was filmed at the Charles M. Schulz Theatre in Knott's Berry Farm on May 14, 2008.

The show is an adaptation of the international reality TV show Dancing with the Stars where Thúy Nga contracted singers were paired up with professional ballroom dancers who have participated in Dancing with the Stars and So You Think You Can Dance. The singers compete to become the winner of the show. Besides dancing, there is a skit performed by Hoài Linh and Chí Tài as well as some guest performances from Thúy Nga singers such as Như Loan, Dương Triệu Vũ, Tuấn Hùng, Thùy Vân, Nguyệt Anh, Hồ Lệ Thu, and Bạch Yến. As the program is not a regular variety show, seven MTVs were added as a bonus at the end of the released DVD. Thúy Nga also does a Dancing Live Tour featuring the dances in Paris by Night 93 at the major cities around the U.S., where the Vietnamese community is concentrated.

After the success of the show, Paris by Night 97: Celebrity Dancing 2 - Khiêu Vũ Của Các Ngôi Sao 2 will be filmed at the same venue on April 22, 2009.

== The winners ==
Best Progress Award: Huơng Thủy

Judges' Choice:

1st Place/Gold Medal: Huơng Thủy

2nd Place/Silver Medal: Hương Lan

3rd Place/Bronze Medal: Khánh Hà

People's Choice: Mai Tiến Dũng

== Track list ==
Disc 1

1. Samba: Bên Nhau Đêm Nay (Dancing All Night) – Nguyễn Cao Kỳ Duyên, Brian, Christian, Anya, Christina, Riohot Dance Group
2. Giới Thiệu Ban Giám Khảo – Khánh Ly, Shanda Sawyer, Nguyễn Hưng, Ðức Huy
3. Pasodoble: Tan Tác – Quỳnh Vi/Tuấn Hùng
4. Cha Cha: Thôi – Trần Thái Hòa/Kaskia
5. Slow Waltz: Suối Tóc – Phi Khanh/Adam Jona
6. Swing: 60 Năm Cuộc Đời – Mai Tiến Dũng/Anya
7. Slow Fox Trot: Yêu Nhau Đi – Lynda Trang Đài/Pasha
8. Rumba: Biển Tình – Quang Lê/Thùy Vân
9. Waltz: Luân Vũ Ngày Mưa – Bảo Hân/Brian
10. Tango: Trizzie's Tango – Trizzie Phương Trinh/Christian
11. Cha Cha: Lời Tỏ Tình Dễ Thương 2 – Lương Tùng Quang/Kristina
12. Waltz: Mưa – Hương Lan/Tuấn Hùng
13. Salsa: Chờ Một Tiếng Yêu – Minh Tuyết/Pasha

Disc 2

1. Cha Cha: Nào Biết Nào Hay? (quizas?) - Hương Thủy/Christian
2. Rumba: Em Là Tất Cả - Bằng Kiều/Alien
3. Mambo: Mambo Italiano - Khánh Hà/Adam Jona
4. Skit: Mộng Khiêu Vũ - Hoài Linh, Chí Tài
5. Trái Tim Đã Được Yêu - Như Loan
6. Em Ở Đâu? - Dương Triệu Vũ
7. Hào Hoa - Tuấn Hùng, Thùy Vân
8. Ru Lòng Khờ Dại - Nguyệt Anh
9. Mambo Yêu Thương - Hồ Lệ Thu
10. Ghen - Bạch Yến
11. Giải Tiến Bộ (Best Progress Award)
12. Giải Ban Giám Khảo (Judges Choice Winner)
13. Giải Khán Giả ( Audience's Choice Winner)
14. Finale

Bonus MTV

1. Bonus MTV: Mong Chờ – Ngọc Liên
2. Thương Hoài Ngàn Năm – Mai Thiên Vân
3. Bởi Vì Anh Yêu Em – Minh Tuyết, Bằng Kiều
4. Dừng Bước – Mai Quốc Huy
5. Tôi Đi Giữa Trời Âu – Hà Phương
6. Thương Về Cố Đô – Nguyên Lê
7. Nội Tôi – Duy Trường
8. Hậu Trường Sân Khấu – Behind The Scenes

Preceded by Paris By Night 92: Paris By Night 92 - Nhạc Yêu Cầu	Paris By Night; Paris by Night 93: Celebrity Dancing - Khiêu Vũ Của Các Ngôi Sao	Succeeded by Paris By Night 94: 25th Anniversary (Part I)
