= Paris by Night 97 =

Paris By Night 97
- Paris by Night episode
- PBN 97 DVD Cover
- Episode no.: Episode 97
- Directed by: Alan Carter
- Masters of ceremonies: Nguyễn Văn Thinh; Nguyễn Cao Kỳ Duyên
- Filmed at: Knott's Berry Farm, California
- Filmed on: April 22, 2009
- Venue: Charles M. Schulz Theater
- Executive producers: Marie Tô; Paul Huỳnh
- Format: 2-Disc DVD
- Release date: September 7, 2009

Paris By Night 97 - Khiêu Vũ Của Các Ngôi Sao 2 (Celebrity Dancing 2) is a Paris By Night program produced by Thúy Nga that was filmed at Knott's Berry Farm on April 22, 2009 and released onto DVD September 7, 2009. The show was approximately 5 hours and was MC'ed by Nguyễn Văn Thinh and Nguyễn Cao Kỳ Duyên.

== Trivia ==
The program is the 2nd part of the Celebrity Dancing series.

Most Progress Award / Giải Tiến Bộ Nhất: Thanh Tuyền

The Judges' Choice:

- Gold Medalist / Giải Huy Chương Vàng: Ngọc Anh
- Silver Medalist / Giải Huy Chương Bạc: Tommy Ngô
- Bronze Medalist / Giải Huy Chương Đồng: Nguyệt Anh

The People's Choice Award / Giải Khán Giả Bầu Chọn: Chí Tài

== Track list ==
=== Disc 1 ===
01. Liên Khúc:

1. Có Nhớ Ðêm Nào (Khánh Băng) - Mai Tiến Dũng (Anya Fuchs)
2. Xuân Yêu Thương - Hương Thủy (Italo Elgueta)
3. Amor, Amor (Lời Việt: Kỳ Duyên) - Kỳ Duyên (Paul Barris)

02. Cha Cha: I Wanna Dance Chacha - Lưu Bích (Adam Jona)

03. Salsa: Màu Xanh Tình Yêu (Sỹ Đan) - Như Loan (Vadim Lyubushkin)

04. Pasodoble: Đoàn Lữ Nhạc (Đỗ Nhuận) - Hồ Lệ Thu (Rumen Atanasov)

05. Rumba: You're My Heart, You're My Soul (Lời Việt: Võ Hoài Phúc) - Dương Triệu Vũ (Alla Novikova)

06. Swing: Vết Son Trên Áo - Tú Quyên (Christopher Beroiz)

07. Cha Cha: Sầu Đông (Khánh Băng) - Trịnh Hội (Thùy Vân)

08. Slow Waltz: A Time For Us (Lời Việt: Phạm Duy) - Nguyệt Anh (Paul Barris)

09. Tango: Kiếp Nghèo (Lam Phương) - Thanh Tuyền (Tuấn Hùng)

10. Salsa: Tequila (Lời Việt: Trường Kỳ) - Trần Thu Hà (Italo Elgueta)

11. Rumba: Bài Ngợi Ca Tình Yêu (Lời Việt: Phạm Duy) - Thanh Hà (Christopher Beroiz)

12. Swing: Kim (Y Vũ) - Thế Sơn (Anya Fuchs)

13. Samba: Samba Cho Em (Ngọc Anh) - Ngọc Anh (Rumen Atanasov)

=== Disc 2 ===
01. Phỏng Vấn Greenroom

02. Argentina Tango: Tình (Văn Phụng) - Tommy Ngô (Liz Lira)

03. Cha Cha: Mandolay (Lời Việt: Võ Hoài Phúc) - Quỳnh Vi (Italo Elgueta)

04. Hustle Disco: Hương (Nhật Ngân) - Chí Tài (Thùy Vân)

05. Video Clip Tổng Hợp 15 Nghệ Sĩ Vừa Trình Diễn

06. Hài Kịch: Tìm Vợ - Việt Hương & Hoài Tâm

07. Mưa Và Em (Triệu Thiên Tuyến) - Bằng Kiều

08. Ướt Lem Chữ Đời © (Vũ Quốc Việt) - Phi Nhung

09. Hãy Cố Quên © (Minh Nhiên) - Minh Tuyết

10. Em Đã Cho Tôi Một Lần Đau (Lời Việt: Lương Tùng Quang) - Lương Tùng Quang

11. Buồn Không Em? (Lam Phương) - Mai Thiên Vân

12. Lambada - (Lời Việt: Trung Hành) Tuấn Hùng & Thùy Vân

13. Huế Mù Sương (Nguyễn Minh Khôi) - Quang Lê

14. Có Không Dài Lâu? © (Võ Hoài Phúc) - Tóc Tiên & Diễm Sương

15. Kết Quả Cuộc Thi

16. Finale

=== BONUS ===
01. Thank You (Roland Casiquin & Brian White) - Bảo Hân (Directed by Khanh Nguyễn)

02. Sài Gòn Em Nhớ Ai (Minh Vy) – Hương Thủy & Duy Trường (Directed by Khanh Nguyễn)

03. Lá Đỗ Muôn Chiều (Đòan Chuẩn & Từ Linh) – Trần Thái Hòa (Directed by Hoàng Tuấn Cương)

04. Vùi Sâu Trái Tim Buồn (Hòai An) – Qùynh Vi (Directed by Hoàng Tuấn Cương)

05. Chuyến Tàu Hòang Hôn (Minh Kỳ) – Mai Quốc Huy

06. Suối Nguồn (Phạm Hữu Tâm) – Thúy Hằng (Directed by Hoàng Tuấn Cương)

- Hậu Trường Sân Khấu – Behind The Scenes

Nhạc phẩm: "Ướt Lem Chữ Đời", "Hãy Cố Quên", " Có Không Dài Lâu?", “Vùi Sâu Trái Tim Buồn” đã được độc quyền cho trung tâm Thúy Nga với sự đồng ý của tác giả. Cấm trích dịch dưới mọi hình thức.

== End credits ==
- Production Designer: Bruce Ryans
- Lighting Designer: Simon Miles
- Choreographer: Shanda Sawyer
- Associate Producer: Kim Tô
- Musical Director: Tùng Châu
- Line Producer: Teresa Taylor
- Production Manager: Richard Võ
- Production Coordinator: Kiệt Cao - Lynn Givens - John Nguyễn
- Background Graphic: Khanh Nguyễn - Cung Đỗ - Adrian Dickey
- Music Arrangements:
  - Tùng Châu
  - Tim Heintz (Opening; Có Không Dài Lâu?)
  - Đòng Sơn (Màu Xanh Tình Yêu, Vết Son Trên Áo, A Time For Us, Tequila, Bài Ngợi Ca Tình Yêu, Mandolay, Hãy Cố Quên, Em Đã Cho Tôi Một Lần Đau, and Lambada)
  - Nguyễn Nhân (I Wanna Dance Chacha; Đoàn Lữ Nhạc)
  - Vũ Quang Trung (Mưa Và Em)
  - Hùng Bass (Samba Cho Em)
- Ballroom Dancers: Rumen Atanasov - Paul Barris - Christopher Beroiz - Italo Elgueta - Anya Fuchs - Adam Jona - Vadim Lyubushkin - Liz Lira - Alla Novikova - Thùy Vân - Tuấn Hùng
- PBN Dancers: Zack Brazenas - Yoori Kim - Taeko Carroll - Chris Liu - Dominic Chaiduang - Buddy Mynatt - Anh Dillon - Katee Shean - Krystal Ellsworth - Tracy Shibata - Eugenia Huang - Paula Van Oppen
- Assistants Choreographers: Eugenia Huang & Tracy Shibata

Buồn Không Em?

- Guitars: Ngọc Trác & Nguyễn Khoa
- Percussions: Nguyễn Huy

Huế Mù Sương

- Đàn Tranh: Giang Thanh
- Flute/Sáo: Nguyễn Bảo Ngọc
- Costume Dance Songs: Calvin Hiệp
  - Assisted by Jacky Tài
- Wardrobe: Jacky Tài & Tony Võ
- Make-Up Artists Gordon Banh - Nhật Bình - Travis Vũ - Mona Lisa Nguyễn - Helena Phạm - Quân Phạm
- Hair Stylists Travis Vũ - Quincy Nguyễn - Philip Trương - Châu Hông
- Photographer: Huy Khiêm
  - Assisted by Joe Hernandez
- Art Directors: Scott Heineman & Brian Livesay
- Props Stephanie Furr - Lưu Nguyễn - Markus Beniger
- Staging Supervisor: Thom Peachee
- Head Carpenter: Scott Broeske
- Lighting Director: Harry Sangmeister
- Media Server: Adrian Dickey
- PRG Lead Technician: Dave Seralles
- Gaffer: Maurice Dupleasis
- Best Boy: Rob Kemery
- Technical Director: Allan Wells
- Technical Supervisor: John Palacio
- Video Engineer: Stuart Wesolik
- Video Tape Operator: Bruce Solberg
- Cameras: Danny Bonilla - Tore Livia - Joe Coppola - Suzanne Ebner - Dave Hilmer - Katherine Lacafano - Allen Merriweather - Dennis Turner - Danny Webb
- Head Video Utility: Bill "Scratch" Griner
- Sound Designer: Bart Chiate
- Sound Mixer: Toby Foster
- Mixer: Eduardo Mackinlay
- BGI Engineer In Charge: Glenn Hazlett
- Director, Entertainment Knotts Berry Farms: Craig Harreld
- Knotts Berry Farms Theatre Production Manager: Lisa Heath
- Lighting: PRG
- LED: Background Images
- Camera Truck: Background Images
- Editors: Chris Osterhus & Khanh Nguyễn

Preceded by Paris By Night 96: Nhạc Yêu Cầu 2	Paris By Night; Paris By Night 97: Khiêu Vũ Của Các Ngôi Sao 2	Succeeded by Paris By Night 98: Fly With Us To Las Vegas
