= Như Loan =

Vietnamese singer (born 1981)

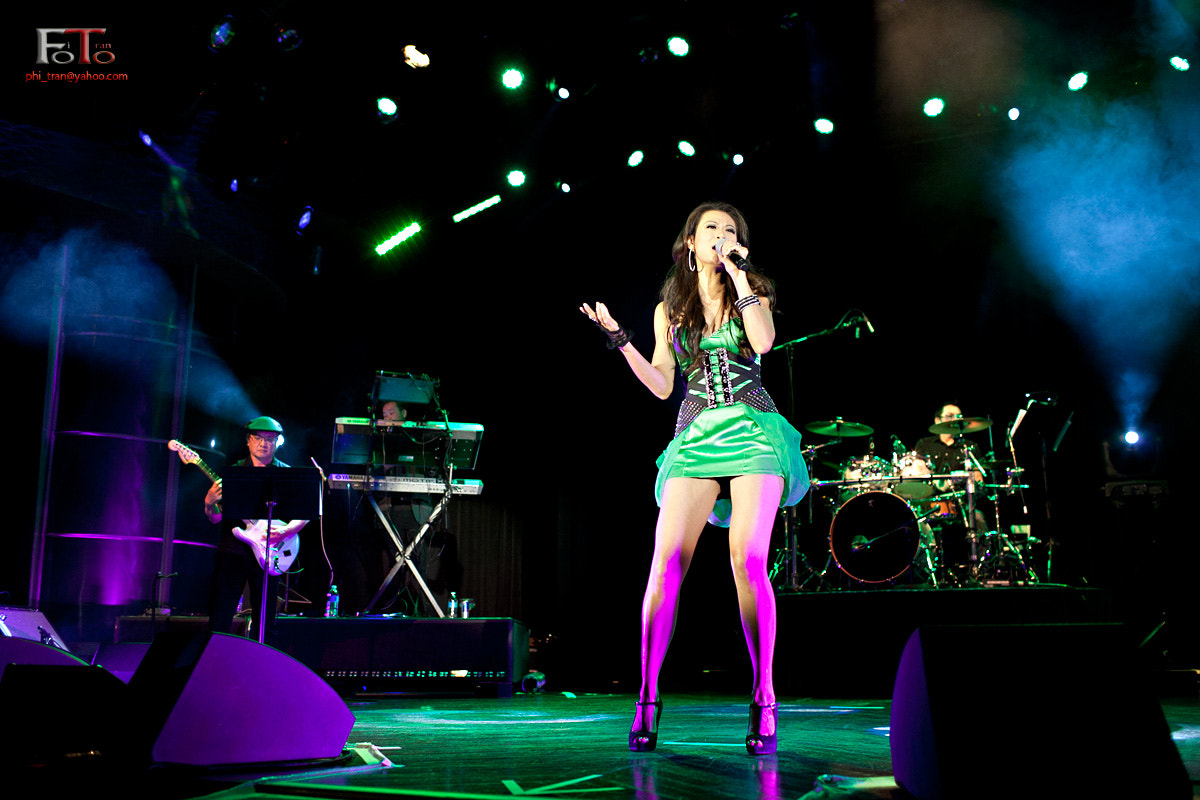

Background information
- Born: Lê Thị Như Loan (as confirmed on T Talk with Thai Nguyen) (anglicised as Olivia Loanne Le); April 20, 1981 (age 45); Bảo Lộc, Lâm Đồng, Vietnam
- Genre: Pop
- Occupations: Singer, model
- Label: Thúy Nga
- Website: www.nhuloan.net

Như Loan is a Vietnamese singer who is currently signed under the music label Thúy Nga; one of the largest overseas Vietnamese music productions that is responsible for Paris By Night, a hit musical variety show. Như Loan was introduced to Thúy Nga Paris By Night through designer Calvin Hiep, whom she has modeled for in the past. She started her singing career as a back-up singer in Paris By Night and was later given the opportunity to sing on stage as a professional singer in Paris By Night 62. Như Loan sang her debut solo in Paris By Night 63 with the song “Men Say Tình Ái ”.

Như Loan released her first solo CD in 2006 titled Tình Lặng Câm, as well as a duet CD titled Sunday Buồn with singer Bảo Hân, and a group CD titled Mong Anh Sẽ Đến with singers Bảo Hân, Loan Châu, and Tú Quyên. She has also been appearing in Thúy Nga's Paris by Night videos and DVDs since 2001. Như Loan has released her second solo CD in mid-2008, planning to release other products in the near future.

== Music ==
Như Loan has released several CDs that have become top-sellers throughout the years. Her first CD, released in 2002, was Mong Anh Sẽ Đến which featured herself and other singers of Thúy Nga: Bảo Hân, Loan Châu, and Tú Quyên. In 2003, she released a duet CD with singer Bảo Hân titled Sunday Buồn. After continuous requests and demands from fans, Như Loan released her debut solo CD titled Tình Lặng Câm in July 2006. She finished her second solo CD "Trai tim da duoc yeu" in 2008. Như Loan is also working on other projects, as well as picking out songs for her third solo CD, set to release in the near future

=== Best of Như Loan ===
Singer: Như Loan

Special guest: Tran Thai Hoa, Lam Nhat Tien, Nguyen Thang, & Nguyet Anh

#	Song List
1	Yeu Nhau Duoi Nang Mai - Nhu Loan
2	Men Say Tinh Ai - Nhu Loan
3	Khi Co Chang - Nhu Loan
4	Nguoi Dien Biet Yeu
5	Neu Khong Co Em Ben Doi - Nhu Loan & Tran Thai Hoa
6	Boulevard - Nhu Loan
7	Khi Giac Mo Ve - Nhu Loan & Lam Nhat Tien
8	Buon Trong Dem Mua - Nhu Loan
9	Em Muon Tin Anh - Nhu Loan
10	Tinh Da Lang Quen - Nhu Loan & Nguyen Thang
11	Hoi Nguoi Tinh - Nhu Loan
12	Mau Xanh Tinh Yeu
13	Ve Day Anh
14	Nhung Ngay Mua Gio/Noi Nho Diu Em - Nhu Loan & Nguyet Anh

==== Mong Anh Sẽ Đến ====
ft. Như Loan, Bảo Hân, Loan Châu, & Tú Quyên

#	Song List
1	Lang Du - Nhu Loan & Bao Han
2	Se Khong Nhu The - Bao Han
3	Ngay Do Ta Yeu Nhau - Tu Quyen
4	Bai Tango Xa Roi - Loan Chau
5	Mong Anh Se Den - Nhu Loan
6	Chi Minh Em Thoi - Tu Quyen
7	Mat Nai Chachacha - Loan Chau
8	Hay Cho Em Ngay Mai - Bao Han
9	Trai Tim Khong Loi - Tu Quyen
10	Didn't You Know - Nhu Loan
11	Tinh Oi - Nhu Loan, Bao Han, Loan Chau, & Tu Quyen

==== Sunday Buồn ====
ft. Như Loan & Bảo Hân

#	Song List
1	Sunday Buồn - Như Loan & Bảo Hân
2	Một Thời Đã Qua - Bảo Hân
3	Nguyện Cầu Tuyết Rơi Trên Sa Mạc - Như Loan
4	Về Với Em - Bảo Hân
5	Em Mơ Bên Chàng - Như Loan
6	Quên Đi Ngày Tháng - Bảo Hân
7	Yêu Như Ngày Mới Quen - Như Loan
8	Thổn Thức Một Tình Yêu - Bảo Hân
9	Cô Đơn - Như Loan
10	Xuân Tình Nồng - Như Loan & Bảo Hân

== Paris By Night ==
Như Loan's first appearance in Thúy Nga was in Paris By Night 57: Am Nhac Va Thoi Trang 1 as a model in Calvin Hiep's fashion show. She also appeared as a back-up singer in Paris By Night 58: Nhung Sac Mau Trong Ky Niem. Như Loan's first performance on stage as a professional and contracted singer of Thúy Nga was in Paris By Night 62: Âm Nhạc Không Biên Giới 1 in 2001.

The following table lists the Paris by Night shows that Như Loan took part in:

#	Appearances in Paris by Night
133	Paris by Night 133: Nguyễn Ngọc Ngạn - The Farewell
130	Paris by Night 130: In Singapore – Glamour
129	Paris by Night 129: Dynasty
128	Paris by Night 128: Hành Trình 35 Năm - Phần 3: Feel The Lights
VIP Party	Paris by Night 128 VIP Party
126	Paris by Night 126: Hành Trình 35 Năm
124	Paris by Night 124: Anh Cho Em Mùa Xuân
123	Paris by Night 123: Ảo Ảnh
120	Paris by Night 120: Còn chút gì để nhớ
118	Paris by Night 118: 50 Năm Âm Nhạc Đức Huy
117	Paris by Night 117: Vườn Hoa Âm Nhạc
116	Paris by Night 116: Nụ cười đầu năm
112	Paris by Night 112: Đông
111	Paris by Night 111: S
110	Paris by Night 110: Phát Lộc Đầu Năm
VIP Party	Paris by Night 109 VIP Party
109	Paris by Night 109: 30th Anniversary Celebration
108	Paris by Night 108: Thời Gian
107	Paris by Night 107: Nguyễn Ngọc Ngạn - 20 Năm Sân Khấu
VIP Party	Paris by Night 106 VIP Party
106	Paris by Night 106: Lụa – Silk
105	Paris by Night 105: Người Tình – The Lovers
VIP Party	Paris by Night 104 VIP Party
104	Paris by Night 104: Beginnings
103	Paris By Night 103: Tình Sử Trong Âm nhạc Việt Nam
102	Paris By Night 102: Nhac Yeu Cau Tinh Ca Lam Phuong
101	Paris By Night 101: Hanh Phuc Dau Nam
VIP Party	Paris By Night 100 VIP Party
100	Paris By Night 100: Ghi Nho Mot Chang Duong
Divas	Paris By Night Special Edition: Divas
99	Paris By Night 99: Toi La Nguoi Vietnam
98	Paris By Night 98: Flying With Us To Las Vegas
97	Paris By Night 97: Celebrity Dancing 2
96	Paris By Night 96: Nhac Yeu Cau 2
95	Paris By Night 95: 25th Anniversary - Cám Ơn Cuộc Ðời
94	Paris By Night 94: 25th Anniversary
93	Paris By Night 93: Celebrity Dancing
92	Paris By Night 92: Nhạc Yêu Cầu
91	Paris By Night 91: Huế, Sàigòn, Hà Nội
90	Paris By Night 90: Chân Dung Người Phụ Nữ Việt Nam
89	Paris By Night 89: In Korea
88	Paris By Night 88: Lam Phương - Đường Về Quê Hương
86	Paris By Night 86: PBN Talent Show - Semi-Finals
85	Paris By Night 85: Xuân Trong Kỷ Niệm
84	Paris By Night 84: In Atlanta - Passport to Music & Fashion
82	Paris By Night 82: Tiếu Vương Hội
81	Paris By Night 81: Âm Nhạc Không Biên Giới 2
80	Paris By Night 80: Tết Khắp Mọi Nhà
79	Paris By Night 79: Dreams
77	Paris By Night 77: 30 Năm Viễn Xứ
76	Paris By Night 76: Xuân Tha Hương
75	Paris By Night 75: Về Miền Viễn Đông - Journey to the Far East
74	Paris By Night 74: Hoa Bướm Ngày Xưa
73	Paris By Night 73: Song Ca Đặc Biệt - The Best of Duets
72	Paris By Night 72: Tiếng Hát Từ Nhịp Tim
71	Paris By Night 71: 20th Anniversary
69	Paris By Night 69: Nợ Tình
68	Paris By Night 68: Nửa Vầng Trăng
67	Paris By Night 67: In San Jose
65	Paris By Night 65: Yêu
63	Paris By Night 63: Dòng Thời Gian
62	Paris By Night 62: Âm Nhạc Không Biên Giới
58	Paris By Night 58: Những Sắc Màu Trong Kỷ Niệm
57	Paris By Night 57: Thời Trang Và Âm Nhạc
