= Paris by Night 66 =

Paris By Night 66
- Paris by Night episode
- Episode no.: Episode 66
- Directed by: Richard Valverde
- Masters of ceremonies: Nguyễn Ngọc Ngạn; Nguyễn Cao Kỳ Duyên
- Filmed at: Paris, France
- Venue: Studios de Paris, Euro Media France, Euro Media Group, Paris, France
- Executive producers: Marie Tô; Paul Huỳnh
- Format: 2 VHS tapes

Paris By Night 66 - Người Tình Và Quê Hương (lit Paris by Night 66 - Lovers and Homeland) is a music variety show performance produced by Thúy Nga Productions for its Paris By Night series. It was filmed in Paris, France, and was hosted by Nguyễn Ngọc Ngạn and Nguyễn Cao Kỳ Duyên. The items focused on the works of composers Trần Trịnh, Ngô Thụy Miên, and Nhật Ngân.

== Track list ==
=== Disc 1 ===
1. Hai Trái Tim Vàng (Trịnh Lâm Ngân) – Lynda Trang Đài, Tommy Ngô

2. Lính Xa Nhà (Trịnh Lâm Ngân) – Mạnh Quỳnh

3. Một Lần Dang Dở (Nhật Ngân) – Phương Diễm Hạnh

4. Tôi Đưa Em Sang Sông (Nhật Ngân & Y Vũ) – Nguyễn Hưng

5. Hương Tình Muộn (Nhật Ngân, thơ: Hương Thảo) – Như Quỳnh

6. Thư Xuân Trên Rừng Cao (Trịnh Lâm Ngân) – Quang Lê

7. Mùa Xuân Của Mẹ (Trịnh Lâm Ngân) – Ngọc Hạ

8. Chiều Qua Phà Hậu Giang (Trịnh Lâm Ngân) – Phi Nhung

9. Người Tình Và Quê Hương (Trịnh Lâm Ngân) – Mỹ Huyền

10. Lệ Đá (Trần Trịnh, lời: Hà Huyền Chi) – Khánh Ly

11. Tiếng Hát Nữa Vời (Trần Trịnh) – Thanh Hà

12. Nỗi Buồn Con Gái (Nhật Ngân) – Tú Quyên

13. Một Mai Giã Từ Vũ Khí (Nhật Ngân) – Thế Sơn

14. Hát Cho Mai Sau (Trịnh Lâm Ngân) – Trường Vũ

15. Lời Đắng Cho Một Cuộc Tình (Nhật Ngân) – Duy Quang

16. Ngày Đá Đơm Bông (Nhật Ngân) – Tâm Đoan

=== Disc 2 ===
17. Liên Khúc Cám Ơn & Xuân Này Con Không Về (Trịnh Lâm Ngân) – Thế Sơn, Như Quỳnh, Phi Nhung, Mạnh Quỳnh

=== Tình Khúc Ngô Thuỵ Miên ===
18. Dấu Tình Sầu – Lưu Bích

19. Mây Bốn Phương Trời – Loan Châu

20. Nỗi Đau Từ Đấy – Trần Thái Hòa

21. Biển Và Em – Khánh Hà

22. Tình Khúc Mùa Xuân – Nhật Trung

23. Nỗi Đau Muộn Màng – Tuấn Ngọc

24. Giọt Nắng Hồng – Thủy Tiên

25. LK Ngô Thụy Miên: Tình Khúc Buồn & Bản Tình Cuối & Riêng Một Góc Trời & Niệm Khúc Cuối & Giáng Ngọc & Chiều Nay Không Có Em & Tình Khúc Mùa Xuân & Áo Lụa Hà Đông – Khánh Hà, Khánh Ly, Tuấn Ngọc, Duy Quang

26. Behind The Scenes (Hậu Trường Sân Khấu)

27. Hài Kịch: Trần Trừng Trị Tái Xuất Giang Hồ (Nhóm Kịch Thúy Nga) – Chí Tài, Trang Thanh Lan, Kiều Linh

Preceded by Paris By Night 65; Yêu	Paris By Night; Paris By Night 66: Người Tình Và Quê Hương	Succeeded by Paris By Night 67: In San Jose
