= Duy Quang =

Vietnamese singer

Duy Quang (né Pham Duy Quang; 4 November 1950 in Hanoi – 19 December 2012 in San Jose, California) was a Vietnamese American singer, best remembered for singing pop music from Vietnam in genre of yellow music, most notably composed by his father Phạm Duy.
