= Don Hồ =

Vietnamese-American singer

- Born: Hồ Mạnh Dũng; 1962 (age 63–64); Saigon, South Vietnam
- Origin: United States
- Genre: Pop
- Years active: 1990–present
- Labels: Thúy Nga & Asia Music Corporation

Hồ Mạnh Dũng (born 1962), better known as Don Hồ is a Vietnamese American singer who is known for appearing in Paris by Night.

== Early life ==
Don Hồ, whose real name is Hồ Mạnh Dũng, was born on February 22, 1962, in Saigon, South Vietnam. His family originally came from northern Vietnam, but they left in 1954 through Operation Passage to Freedom, fleeing the encroachment of communist rule over North Vietnam. He came to the United States in 1980 and attended Santa Ana Valley High School. During his senior year, he participated in a choral group called Chamber Singers. As a young man, Don Hồ has proved to be skillful in painting. He received a scholarship from an art school in New York, but his love for singing turned him from his path to becoming a painter.

== Career ==
=== Thúy Nga (1990–2004, 2008–present) ===
In 1990, Don Hồ appeared in two medleys in Paris By Night 12. After the release of the VHS, fans praised the singer and requested more from him. He performed for Paris by Night 15 in 1992, singing Paul Anka's song, Diana and starting a decade-long career with Thúy Nga. They had many notable hits, such as "Tinh Nhat Phai (Caravan of Life)", "Vuc Sau Hanh Phuc", "I (Who Have Nothing)", & "Mot Thuo Yeu Nguoi". In 2000, to celebrate Hồ's 10th year with the production, Thuy Nga released "Nhip Buoc Hoang Vu," a video collection featuring new music videos, an interview with Don Hồ, and singers congratulating him on his success. But soon after, Don's career took a step back as younger singers came in to match a new generation. 2004 brought Paris By Night 73 with Don Hồ performing with Loan Châu in a Chinese-inspired performance. At this time, Don decided to not renew his contract with Thúy Nga, to pursue other ventures with other music companies.

In 2008, Thúy Nga celebrated Paris by Night's 25th Anniversary. Don Hồ decided to return to Thúy Nga at this point, a few years after his contract ended and after venturing with other productions. He performed Diem Xua by Trịnh Công Sơn in a sea-inspired production which was highly praised for his return. As of 2013, Don has performed in each Paris by Night production, except Paris By Night 97, as he wasn't a participant of the competition. In these performances, Don is well known to have created animations to go with the song, seen in "LK Tinh Em Ngon Nen", "Con Tim Mu Loa", and "Tai Sao La Khong?". He is also well known for performing duets with the likes of Thanh Ha, Chau Ngoc, and Nhu Loan.

=== Other ventures ===
As Don left Thúy Nga after his contract expires, he would sign with Asia Productions, which he had relations with in the 1990s. He first appear with the production in their first video, taking place in Las Vegas. The song that Don Hồ would be best known for, is "Trai Tim Mua Dong" which appeared in Asia's Christmas Special in 1995. During this time, Don would not appear on Asia's stage as his Thúy Nga contract and other obligations prevented him from appearing, so he would appear in music videos made for the program. In 2005, Don's contract with Thúy Nga had ended, so Don went on to appear in numerous Asia videos. Asia's fans had lauded the return of Don Hồ as he brought creativity to his appearances and in these performances, Don would perform by himself and in duets with Lam Thuy Van, Lam Nhat Tien, and Dieu Huong, who writes many of the songs Don has performed. During this time, he appeared in many other videos including Tinh Music and Van Son Entertainment. Many of them included Don Hồ's graphics and artwork, which has amazed fans everywhere. Don has ended pursuing other ventures, as he returned to Thúy Nga, where he is more globally recognized.

== Personal life ==
He attended Chu Van An School in Saigon, Katella High School, Los Amigos High School and later Orange Coast College, Golden West College, and Cal State Fullerton. Don Hồ currently lives in Santa Monica, California.

== See also ==
- List of Vietnamese Americans
