= Thế Sơn =

Vietnamese singer

- Born: October 10, 1965 (age 60); Saigon, South Vietnam
- Occupation: Singer

Thế Sơn (born 10 October 1965) is a Vietnamese language pop singer from southern Vietnam, and is a long-time member of the long running Vietnamese diaspora variety show Paris by Night. He performed in Paris By Night from July 1994 until July 2014 and Asia Music Corporation from 2014 until 2018.

Thế Sơn's father was an officer in the Army of the Republic of Vietnam, and was imprisoned by the communists after the fall of Saigon. Thế Sơn took up singing to support his family and formed a duet with Thủy Tiên. He attended Marie Curie High School and La San Taberd High School (Trường Trung học La San Taberd), now renamed as Trần Đại Nghĩa High School. Thế Sơn completed a university degree in music (singing) at the Saigon Conservatory of Music and moved to the United States, now residing in Southern California. He is known for singing songs from the 1940s to the 1970s.
