= Khánh Hà =

Vietnamese singer

Lã Thị Khánh Hà
- Born: February 28, 1952 (age 73)
- Origin: Đà Lạt, Lâm Đồng, Indochina
- Genres: Nhạc tiền chiến, Tình khúc 1954-1975, Nhạc hải ngoại

Khánh Hà (born 28 March 1952 in Đà Lạt) is a Vietnamese singer. Her older brother is Tuấn Ngọc.

Two of her songs appear in the film Gleaming the Cube.

== Early life ==
Her full name is Lã Thị Khánh Hà, also known as Lữ Khánh Hà. She was born on February 28, 1952, in Da Lat. Her father, Lữ Liên is a musician. Due to the influence of her father, she and her 6 siblings later followed a career in singing and became famous singers abroad, including Bích Chiêu, Tuấn Ngọc, Anh Tú, Thúy Anh, Lan Anh and Lưu Bích.

== Career ==
At the age of 16, Khánh Hà performed for the first time for the National Lottery event at Thong Nhat theater.

In 1969, she appeared in the "Hippies À GoGo" program organized weekly at Queen Bee discotheque on Nguyen Hue Boulevard, Saigon. Later that year, she joined The Blue Jets band with Anh Tú and Thúy Anh.

After the events of April 30 in 1975, she migrated to the United States.

During the first few years abroad, she often performed music in French, English. In 1980 she returned to performing Vietnamese music.

In the years 1986-1987, she organized her own music program known as "Khanh Ha Center", which was performed at Sea Palace, Tung cafe in Monterey Park. She was also one of the first singers to collaborate with Thúy Nga Center when she was performing in Paris.

== Personal life ==
Khánh Hà got married at the age of 18. However, despite having a son together, the couple soon broke up.

In 1990, she performed in the "Hè 1990" (Summer of 1990) event held by Tô Chấn Phong and Lưu Huỳnh. It was on this occasion that she and Tô Chấn Phong got to know each other. Since then, they have lived together until today. The two had a child.
