= Hồ Lệ Thu =

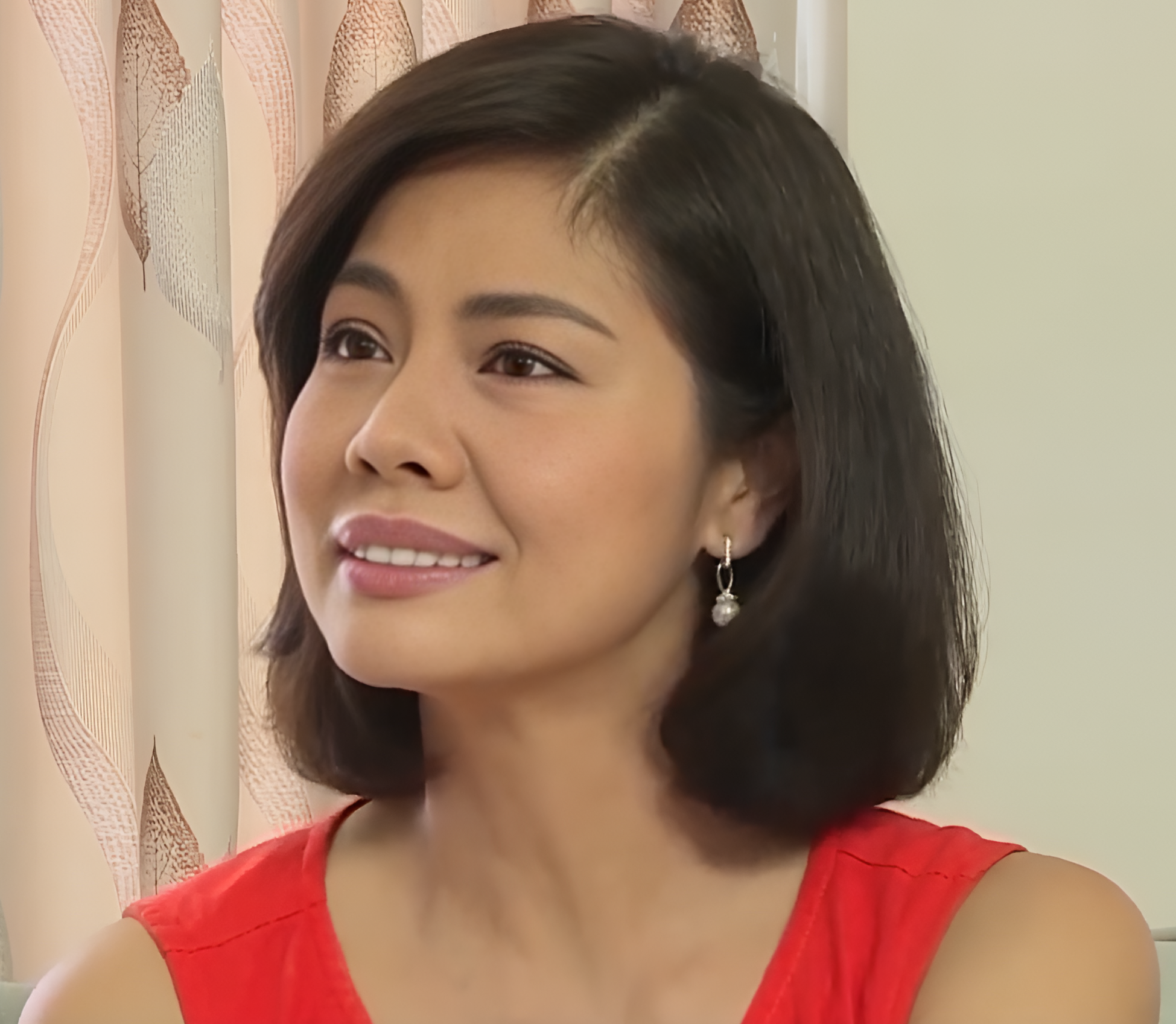
- Hồ Lệ Thu in 2020

Background information
- Born: Tào Thế Lệ Thu; October 19, 1973 (age 53); Hanoi, North Vietnam
- Occupations: Singer, Actress, Philanthropist
- Instruments: Singing, Acting, Dancing
- Label: Thúy Nga
- Website: www.holethu.com/home.htm

Tào Thế Lệ Thu, stage name Hồ Lệ Thu (Hanoi, October 19, 1973) is a pop singer from northern Vietnam.

HOA THIEN TAM Charity Foundation was founded by Ho Le Thu in the United States. The foundation was established to fund Vocational Rehabilitation for Poor Disabled Youth in Vietnam to get a new start in life.
