= Hương Thủy (singer) =

Vietnamese singer

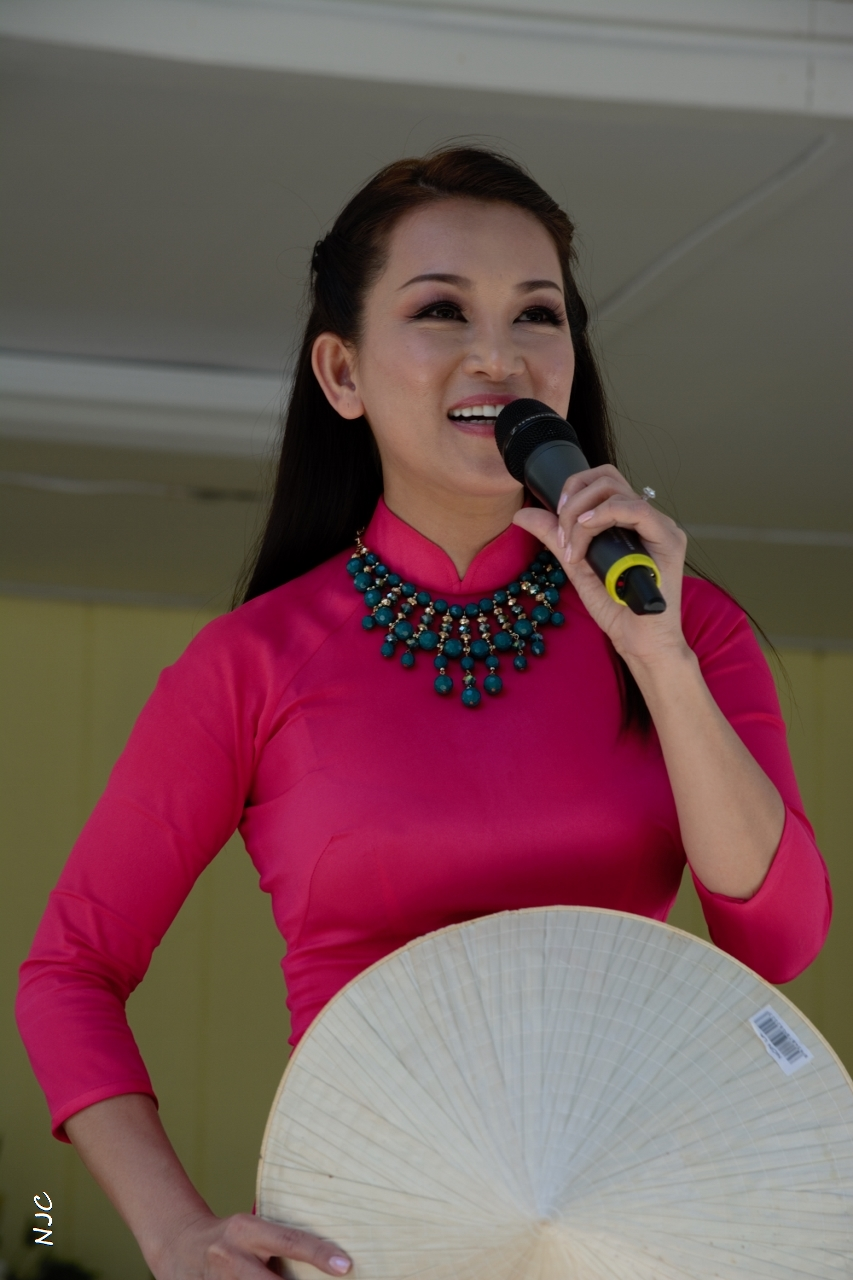
- Ca Sĩ Hương Thủy - North Carolina 2014 May
- Born: Nguyễn Thị Hương Thủy; August 20, 1974 (age 52); Cần Thơ, South Vietnam

Nguyễn Thị Hương Thủy is a Vietnamese-language singer from southern Vietnam known for ca dao and cải lương singing. She appears on the Vietnamese diaspora variety show Paris by Night, making her debut in Paris By Night 72: Tiếng Hát Từ Nhịp Tim. She also acts in their plays and musicals.

Hương Thủy was born in Cần Thơ, southern Vietnam and spent her childhood living in a pagoda in Vĩnh Long. Growing up, her dream was to become a singer. She was accepted to learn in Đại Học Sân Khấu Cải Lương và Hài Kịch in Saigon.

After graduating, she became a member of the "Tam Ca Phù Sa" band, then migrated to southern California, where she was introduced to Thúy Nga. Thúy Nga has successfully introduced her to the audience. She became known as a Thúy Nga singer.

== Trivia ==
- Height: 1 '65 m (5' 5 ')
- Family: Parents and 3 brothers
- Favorite food: Rau mồng tơi nấu canh tép
- Favorite song: Chuyện tình Lan và Điệp 1-2-3, Hạ buồn, Kiếp cầm ca, Ca dao, Ngẫu hứng ru con
