= List of Hidden Voices (game show) episodes =

Television game show episode list

About the series
- Hidden Voices is a Vietnamese television mystery music game show broadcast by HTV7, featuring its "battle format" modified from the South Korean programme I Can See Your Voice that was technically included as part of the franchise.
- More about the series

Episodes overview
- Total episode(s): 92
- Aired episode(s): 90
- Special episode(s): 2

The Vietnamese television mystery music game show Hidden Voices (also known by its main title Giọng ải giọng ai, lit. 'Who is that voice?'; abbreviated as GAGA) has played a total of five seasons and 92 episodes; (Note: This also includes a recently aired 5th season, which originally planned to suspend auditions and subsequently halt its production due to the COVID-19 pandemic.) broadcasting on HTV7 from 5 November 2016 to 4 October 2020.

== Series overview ==
Series	Episodes	Originally released		Good singers	Bad singers
Series	Episodes	First released	Last released	Good singers	Bad singers
1	18	5 November 2016	4 March 2017	20	16
2	18	7 October 2017	3 February 2018	19	17
3	15	28 July 2018	11 November 2018	17	13
4	25 (Note: The 4th season has originally scheduled to air for 15 episodes, with Phan Mạnh Quỳnh defeating Thùy Chi on its tentative [15th episode] finale on 2 November 2019; this was later added by 11 unaired episodes until the formal conclusion on 18 January 2020.)	27 July 2019	18 January 2020	27	23
5	14	28 June 2020	4 October 2020	14	14
Sp	2	4 January 2020	26 July 2020	2	2

== Episodes ==
=== Season 1 (2016–17) ===
List of season 1 episodes
No. overall	No. in season	Guest artist(s)	Player order (Note: It refers to the guest artist(s) that have played in according to their first game; returning guest artists (which also include foreigners or former good singers, with their names displaying in italics) are not counted.)	Original release date
2016
1	1	Quang Vinh vs. Tóc Tiên	1–2	5 November 2016
2	2	Trịnh Thăng Bình vs. Yến Trang	3–4	12 November 2016
3	3	Quốc Thiên vs. Bích Phương	5–6	19 November 2016
4	4	Chi Pu vs. Gil Lê	7–8	26 November 2016
5	5	Suni Hạ Linh vs. Ngô Kiến Huy	9–10	3 December 2016
6	6	Chi Dân vs. Võ Hạ Trâm	11–12	10 December 2016
7	7	Bảo Thy vs. Sơn Thạch (365daband) (Note: Highlights: 365daband designated as a group, in which different members playing on subsequent games are actually returned; Isaac Phạm, Jun Phạm, Sơn Thạch, Tronie Ngô, and Will Nguyễn have been played.; Good singer Jang Mi (s3 ep. 13) also returned, playing as a guest artist.)	13–14	17 December 2016
8	8	Hương Tràm vs. Cao Thái Sơn	15–16	24 December 2016
9	9	Hari Won vs. Trúc Nhân	17–18	31 December 2016
2017
10	10	Dương Triệu Vũ vs. Bảo Anh	19–20	7 January 2017
11	11	Lương Bích Hữu vs. Hồ Quang Hiếu	21–22	14 January 2017
12	12	Đại Nhân vs. Hương Giang	23–24	21 January 2017
13	13	Lê Giang vs. Hữu Quốc	25–26	28 January 2017
14	14	Thái Trinh vs. Bùi Anh Tuấn	27–28	4 February 2017
15	15	Chí Thiện vs. Hoàng Yến Chibi	29–30	11 February 2017
16	16	Phạm Hồng Phước vs. Ái Phương	31–32	18 February 2017
17	17	Nguyễn Hải Phong vs. Thu Minh	33–34	25 February 2017
18	18	Bạch Công Khanh vs. Hòa Minzy	35–36	4 March 2017

=== Season 2 (2017–18) ===
List of season 2 episodes
No. overall	No. in season	Guest artist(s)	Player order	Original release date
2017
19	1	Văn Mai Hương vs. Trung Quân	37–38	7 October 2017
20	2	Jun Phạm (365daband) vs. Miu Lê	39	14 October 2017
21	3	Thanh Duy vs. Tronie Ngô (365daband)	40	21 October 2017
22	4	Gin Tuấn Kiệt vs. Anh Tú	41–42	28 October 2017
23	5	Lam Trường vs. Phương Thanh	43–44	4 November 2017
24	6	Bích Phương vs. Đức Phúc	45	11 November 2017
25	7	Thu Thủy vs. Ưng Hoàng Phúc	46–47	18 November 2017
26	8	Trịnh Thăng Bình vs. Yến Nhi	48	25 November 2017
27	9	Min vs. Will Nguyễn (365daband)	49	2 December 2017
28	10	Only C vs. Phương Trinh Jolie	50–51	9 December 2017
29	11	Khổng Tú Quỳnh vs. Ngô Kiến Huy	52	16 December 2017
30	12	Giang Hồng Ngọc vs. Ưng Đại Vệ	53–54	23 December 2017
31	13	Hoài Lâm vs. Vũ Cát Tường	55–56	30 December 2017
2018
32	14	Tiêu Châu Như Quỳnh vs. Châu Đăng Khoa	57–58	6 January 2018
33	15	Vicky Nhung vs. Hoàng Tôn	59–60	13 January 2018
34	16	Đoan Trang vs. Đăng Khôi	61–62	20 January 2018
35	17	Khắc Việt vs. Trà My	63–64	27 January 2018
36	18	Thanh Ngọc vs. Nhật Tinh Anh	65–66	3 February 2018

=== Season 3 (2018) ===
List of season 3 episodes
No. overall	No. in season	Guest artist(s)	Player order	Original release date
37	1	Hòa Minzy vs. Erik Thành	67	28 July 2018
38	2	Hoàng Yến Chibi vs. Gin Tuấn Kiệt	–	4 August 2018
39	3	Anh Tú vs. Hari Won	–	11 August 2018
40	4	Bùi Anh Tuấn vs. Hương Tràm	–	18 August 2018
41	5	Trang Pháp vs. Mai Tiến Dũng	68–69	25 August 2018
42	6	Hồng Ngọc vs. Đan Trường	70–71	1 September 2018
43	7	Han Sara vs. Karik	72–73	8 September 2018
44	8	Hương Giang vs. Kay Trần	74	15 September 2018
45	9	Gil Lê vs. Isaac Phạm (365daband)	—	22 September 2018
46	10	Kim Tử Long vs. Thoại Mỹ	75–76	29 September 2018
47	11	Hiền Hồ vs. Phan Mạnh Quỳnh	77–78	6 October 2018
48	12	Chi Dân vs. Phạm Quỳnh Anh	79	13 October 2018
49	13	Sơn Thạch (365daband) vs. Jang Mi	—	20 October 2018
50	14	Nam Cường vs. Phương Trinh Jolie	80	27 October 2018
51	15	Thanh Duy vs. Đại Nhân	—	3 November 2018

=== Season 4 (2019–20) ===
List of season 4 episodes
No. overall	No. in season	Guest artist(s)	Player order	Original release date
2019
52	1	Chi Dân vs. Thu Thủy	—	27 July 2019
53	2	Ngô Kiến Huy vs. Phương Thanh	—	3 August 2019
54	3	Trịnh Thăng Bình vs. Hari Won	—	10 August 2019
55	4	Kim Tử Long vs. Ngọc Huyền	—	17 August 2019
56	5	Võ Hạ Trâm vs. Kay Trần	—	24 August 2019
57	6	Đức Phúc vs. Erik Thành	—	31 August 2019
58	7	Dương Triệu Vũ vs. Minh Hằng	81	7 September 2019
59	8	Lam Trường vs. Thu Minh	—	14 September 2019
60	9	Văn Mai Hương vs. Vũ Cát Tường	—	21 September 2019
61	10	Trung Quân vs. Giang Hồng Ngọc	—	28 September 2019
62	11	Gin Tuấn Kiệt vs. Quân AP	82	5 October 2019
63	12	Osad vs. Orange	83–84	12 October 2019
64	13	Khắc Hưng vs. Khắc Việt	85	19 October 2019
65	14	Will Nguyễn (365daband) vs. Ái Phương	—	26 October 2019
66	15	Thùy Chi vs. Phan Mạnh Quỳnh	86	2 November 2019
67	16	Phạm Quỳnh Anh vs. Ưng Hoàng Phúc	—	9 November 2019
68	17	Jaykii vs. Ali Hoàng Dương	87–88	16 November 2019
69	18	Trúc Nhân vs. Trọng Hiếu	89	23 November 2019
70	19	Suni Hạ Linh vs. Tố My	90	30 November 2019
71	20	Hoàng Yến Chibi vs. Sơn Thạch (365daband)	—	7 December 2019
72	21	Hiền Hồ vs. Mai Tiến Dũng	—	14 December 2019
73	22	Nguyễn Trần Trung Quân vs. Thủy Tiên	91–92	21 December 2019
74	23	Quang Vinh vs. Ngô Kiến Huy	—	28 December 2019
2020
75	24	Quốc Thiên vs. Lê Bảo Bình	94	11 January 2020
76	25	Uyên Linh vs. Mỹ Linh	95–96	18 January 2020

=== Season 5 (2020) ===
List of season 5 episodes
No. overall	No. in season	Guest artist(s)	Player order	Original release date
77	1	Hòa Minzy vs. Erik Thành	—	28 June 2020
78	2	Miu Lê vs. Lou Hoàng	97	5 July 2020
79	3	Siu Black vs. Quang Hà	98–99	12 July 2020
80	4	Thủy Tiên vs. Dương Triệu Vũ	—	19 July 2020
81	5	Amee vs. Kay Trần	100	2 August 2020
82	6	Nhật Kim Anh vs. Dương Ngọc Thái	101	9 August 2020
83	7	Quân AP vs. Thiều Bảo Trâm	102	16 August 2020
84	8	Trúc Nhân vs. Ali Hoàng Dương	—	23 August 2020
85	9	Đoan Trang vs. Bảo Thy	—	30 August 2020
86	10	Chi Dân vs. Bùi Lan Hương	103	6 September 2020
87	11	Trung Quân vs. Bảo Anh	—	13 September 2020
88	12	Đạt G vs. Văn Mai Hương	104	20 September 2020
89	13	Trịnh Thăng Bình vs. Cao Thái Sơn	—	27 September 2020
90	14	Khắc Việt vs. Dương Hoàng Yến	105	4 October 2020

== Specials ==
List of special episodes
No.	Title	Guest artist(s)	Player order	Original release date
1	"Kids special"	Hồ Việt Trung vs. Trang Pháp	93	4 January 2020
2	"Celebrity special"	Vũ Cát Tường vs. Tóc Tiên	—	26 July 2020
