= Hidden Voices (game show) season 4 =

Television game show season

Hidden Voices
- Season 4
- Starring: Trấn Thành; Trường Giang
- Hosted by: Đại Nghĩa
- Winners: Good singers: 28; Bad singers: 24
- No. of episodes: Regular: 25; Special: 1; Overall: 26

Release
- Original network: HTV7
- Original release: 27 July 2019 – 18 January 2020

Season chronology
- ← Previous; Season 3 Next → Season 5

The fourth season of the Vietnamese television mystery music game show Hidden Voices premiered on HTV7 on 27 July 2019. Despite the linear television broadcasts ended on 2 November 2019, this season would continue through streaming until its formal conclusion on 18 January 2020. (Note: The 4th season has originally scheduled to air for 15 episodes, with Phan Mạnh Quỳnh defeating Thùy Chi on its tentative [15th episode] finale on 2 November 2019; this was later added by 11 unaired episodes until the formal conclusion on 18 January 2020.)

== Gameplay ==
=== Format ===
Under the "battle format", two opposing guest artists eliminate one singer each during the proper game phase, and then keep one singer each to join the final performance. The winner is determined by the remaining mystery singers, who are chosen by opposing guest artists, as per specific winning condition depends on the outcome of their final performance, if:

1. One opposing guest artist kept a good singer and the other had a bad singer, or
2. Both opposing guest artists kept good or bad singers.

If the last remaining mystery singer is good, the guest artist wins D50,000,000; in case of a tie, the same prize money is split, receiving D25,000,000 each. Both winning mystery singers, regardless of being good or bad, get D10,000,000 each.

=== Rounds ===
1. Visual round
  The guest artist is given some time to observe and examine each mystery singer based on their appearance. Afterward, a muted video of each mystery singer that reveals only 0.3 seconds of their singing voice is played as an additional hint.
2. Lip sync round
  Each mystery singer performs a lip sync to a song; good singers mime to a recording of their own, while bad singers mime to a backing track by another vocalist.
3. Interrogation round
  The guest artist may ask questions to the remaining mystery singers. Good singers are required to give truthful responses, while the bad singers must lie.

== Episodes ==
=== Guest artists ===
Legend:
Good singer
Bad singer

2019 games
Episode		Guest artist (Note: Players' notes: For the returning guest artists (who also include foreigners and former good singers), names are displayed in italics.; For the mixed groups, names who identified as bad singers are displayed in italics.)	Mystery singers (In their respective numbers and aliases)					
#	Date	Guest artist	Elimination order					Winner
#	Date	Guest artist	Visual round		Lip sync round		Interrogation round	Winner
1	27 July 2019	Chi Dân	7. Thành Vinh	1. Phương Ngọc	3. Như Quỳnh	6. Tấn Lộc	2. Nhật Phương	4. Cẩm Ngân
1	27 July 2019	Thu Thủy	7. Thành Vinh	1. Phương Ngọc	3. Như Quỳnh	6. Tấn Lộc	2. Nhật Phương	5. Đình Tú
2	3 August 2019	Ngô Kiến Huy	6. Bảo Vi	4. Minh Anh	2. Ngọc Thúy	1. Tiểu Mi	5. Minh Chiến	7. Vĩnh Phúc
2	3 August 2019	Phương Thanh	6. Bảo Vi	4. Minh Anh	2. Ngọc Thúy	1. Tiểu Mi	5. Minh Chiến	3. Chí Hải
3	10 August 2019	Hari Won	3. Duy Văn	5. Minh Thật	4. Hồng Vy	2. Khánh Đăng	7. Hoàng Phong	6. Trùng Dương
3	10 August 2019	Trịnh Thăng Bình	3. Duy Văn	5. Minh Thật	4. Hồng Vy	2. Khánh Đăng	7. Hoàng Phong	1. Gia Nhi
4	17 August 2019	Kim Tử Long	7. Nhã Đàn	1. Giang Trầm Tích	5. Truyền Giang	2. Cao Thanh Hà	4. Mạc Kim Thắng	3. Phạm Nhàn
4	17 August 2019	Ngọc Huyền	7. Nhã Đàn	1. Giang Trầm Tích	5. Truyền Giang	2. Cao Thanh Hà	4. Mạc Kim Thắng	6. Duy Long
5	24 August 2019	Võ Hạ Trâm	2. Nguyên Anh	7. Đặng Hải Dương	1. Ngọc Trúc	6. Thanh Thảo	4. Quốc Nghĩa	3. Hoàng Oanh
5	24 August 2019	Kay Trần	2. Nguyên Anh	7. Đặng Hải Dương	1. Ngọc Trúc	6. Thanh Thảo	4. Quốc Nghĩa	5. Đức Anh
6	31 August 2019	Đức Phúc	5. Hoàng Yến	3. Tố Như	1. Văn Minh	6. Nguyễn Tường Vy	2. Đức Minh	7. Bùi Linh
6	31 August 2019	Erik Thành	5. Hoàng Yến	3. Tố Như	1. Văn Minh	6. Nguyễn Tường Vy	2. Đức Minh	4. An Duy
7	7 September 2019	Dương Triệu Vũ	6. Đình Hiếu	2. Ngọc Như	1. Tú Trinh	3. Bryan Huỳnh Anh	7. Lê Khải	5. Khánh Linh
7	7 September 2019	Minh Hằng	6. Đình Hiếu	2. Ngọc Như	1. Tú Trinh	3. Bryan Huỳnh Anh	7. Lê Khải	4. Trà My
8	14 September 2019	Lam Trường	6. Trần Hoải Phương	4. Võ Hoằng Phương	3. Phạm Thị Diệp	7. Thủ Hả	1. Lê Thu Hiển	2. Sin Khoa
8	14 September 2019	Thu Minh	6. Trần Hoải Phương	4. Võ Hoằng Phương	3. Phạm Thị Diệp	7. Thủ Hả	1. Lê Thu Hiển	5. Mình Trần
9	21 September 2019	Văn Mai Hương	4. Dương Bảo	5. Bích Trâm	2. Ngô Thể Hiển	3. Lương Hoảng Phúc (Note: Season highlights: In 9th episode, a mystery singer "disguising as a teddy bear" performed on the stage of truth that "obviously using a pre-recorded piece sung by a unknown bad singer". It was performed again in 10th episode, revealing as good singer Lương Hoảng Phúc.; 365daband designated as a group, in which different members playing on subsequent games are actually returned; Isaac Phạm, Jun Phạm, Sơn Thạch, Tronie Ngô, and Will Nguyễn have been played.)	1. Hải Tiên	6. Phước Lĩnh
9	21 September 2019	Vũ Cát Tường	4. Dương Bảo	5. Bích Trâm	2. Ngô Thể Hiển	3. Lương Hoảng Phúc	1. Hải Tiên	7. Trâm Anh
10	28 September 2019	Trung Quân	6. Trọng Nguyễn	7. Huyền Trang	5. Lương Hoảng Phúc	2. Trường An	4. Quốc Lĩnh	1. Dư Uyên
10	28 September 2019	Giang Hồng Ngọc	6. Trọng Nguyễn	7. Huyền Trang	5. Lương Hoảng Phúc	2. Trường An	4. Quốc Lĩnh	3. Phương Thảo
11	5 October 2019	Gin Tuấn Kiệt	1. Trương Thị Nhi	5. Trần Thiện Ăn	7. Nguyễn Đăng Huyên Nga	4. Trương Quốc Khang	6. Trần Ngọc Brothers	3. Thảo Ngọc
11	5 October 2019	Quân AP	1. Trương Thị Nhi	5. Trần Thiện Ăn	7. Nguyễn Đăng Huyên Nga	4. Trương Quốc Khang	6. Trần Ngọc Brothers	2. Trần Ngọc Thải
12	12 October 2019	Osad	1. (South Korea) Choi Sung-rak	6. Thiện Hưng	3. Pang Ting Phira	4. Thanh Nhàn	5. Thanh Vinh	7. Hồng Thanh Triệu
12	12 October 2019	Orange	1. (South Korea) Choi Sung-rak	6. Thiện Hưng	3. Pang Ting Phira	4. Thanh Nhàn	5. Thanh Vinh	2. Phạm Thị Trang
13	19 October 2019	Khắc Hưng	5. Kim Hoàng	2. Lê Thị Dẫn	1. Mình Luân	4. Lê Tấn Lợi	7. Tổng Hoằng Duy	3. Thanh Chương
13	19 October 2019	Khắc Việt	5. Kim Hoàng	2. Lê Thị Dẫn	1. Mình Luân	4. Lê Tấn Lợi	7. Tổng Hoằng Duy	6. Lương Trung Kiến
14	26 October 2019	Will Nguyễn (365daband)	6. Anh Thơ	7. Hoàng Lâm	3. Trương Tổ Huê	2. Võ Hạnh Hiển	1. Nguyễn Lộc Vinh Phúc	4. Võ Minh Hiểu
14	26 October 2019	Ái Phương	6. Anh Thơ	7. Hoàng Lâm	3. Trương Tổ Huê	2. Võ Hạnh Hiển	1. Nguyễn Lộc Vinh Phúc	5. Thủy Nga
15	2 November 2019	Thùy Chi	3. Mỹ Hạnh	1. Bảo Khánh	5. Chi Bảo	4. Quán Nguyễn	7. Nguyễn Hạnh	2. Hứa Ngọc Ngân
15	2 November 2019	Phan Mạnh Quỳnh	3. Mỹ Hạnh	1. Bảo Khánh	5. Chi Bảo	4. Quán Nguyễn	7. Nguyễn Hạnh	6. Đức Anh
16	9 November 2019	Phạm Quỳnh Anh	3. Trần Thị Ngọc Châu	2. Trần Huỳnh Đức	4. Trần Quốc Sơn	6. Nguyễn Ngọc Khánh	5.. Hỗ Thanh Toán	7. Nguyễn Thị Kiểu Loan
16	9 November 2019	Ưng Hoàng Phúc	3. Trần Thị Ngọc Châu	2. Trần Huỳnh Đức	4. Trần Quốc Sơn	6. Nguyễn Ngọc Khánh	5.. Hỗ Thanh Toán	1. Bùi Thanh Lộc
17	16 November 2019	Jaykii	1. Tú Uyên	7. Là Hoang Quang Huy	6. Lê Đinh Chiến	2. Đặng Hữu Duy	3. Lan Anh	4. Kim Huê
17	16 November 2019	Ali Hoàng Dương	1. Tú Uyên	7. Là Hoang Quang Huy	6. Lê Đinh Chiến	2. Đặng Hữu Duy	3. Lan Anh	4. Cát Tưởng
18	23 November 2019	Trúc Nhân	1. Nguyễn Trả Như Nghĩa	2. Nguyễn Nhật Tân	5. Võ Ngọc Xuan Ca	3. Trần Hoàng Lâm Ngữ	4. Vaio Triều Hồ	6. Nguyễn Đăng Nguyên
18	23 November 2019	Trọng Hiếu	1. Nguyễn Trả Như Nghĩa	2. Nguyễn Nhật Tân	5. Võ Ngọc Xuan Ca	3. Trần Hoàng Lâm Ngữ	4. Vaio Triều Hồ	7. Phạm Thùy Lĩnh
19	30 November 2019	Suni Hạ Linh	1. Hoải Nam	3. Thái Bảo	6. Lê Hoàng Thẳng	2. Nguyễn Thục Bảo Trấn	5. Ngọc Tu	7. Minh Trí
19	30 November 2019	Tố My	1. Hoải Nam	3. Thái Bảo	6. Lê Hoàng Thẳng	2. Nguyễn Thục Bảo Trấn	5. Ngọc Tu	4. Thanh Tuyển
20	7 December 2019	Hoàng Yến Chibi	4. Lê Công Ty	1. Bảo Ngọc	3. Trần Tăng Thành	6. Bích Kiểu	2. Mạnh Duy	7. Duy Lĩnh
20	7 December 2019	Sơn Thạch (365daband)	4. Lê Công Ty	1. Bảo Ngọc	3. Trần Tăng Thành	6. Bích Kiểu	2. Mạnh Duy	5. Nguyễn Lê Thủy Ngọc
21	14 December 2019	Hiền Hồ	6. Diu Ái	4. Lê Thành Tuẫn	3. Kiều Tiên	7. Trung Tín	1. Lê Văn Khải	2. Đặng Lê Hồng Nhi
21	14 December 2019	Mai Tiến Dũng	6. Diu Ái	4. Lê Thành Tuẫn	3. Kiều Tiên	7. Trung Tín	1. Lê Văn Khải	5. Trần Lê Đức
22	21 December 2019	Nguyễn Trần Trung Quân	1. Nguyễn Tiễn Đạt	6. Ái Liên	4. Trương Mẫn Thanh	2. Vương Thiên Phúc	3. Phương Thảo	5. Trần Bảo Hẳn
22	21 December 2019	Thủy Tiên	1. Nguyễn Tiễn Đạt	6. Ái Liên	4. Trương Mẫn Thanh	2. Vương Thiên Phúc	3. Phương Thảo	7. Lâm Minh Tha
23	28 December 2019	Quang Vinh	4. Lê Trương Giang	1. Thu Tra and Minh Trâm	5. Vi Nguyễn Thiên Thương	2. Nguyễn Thị Mông Tuyển	3. (Laos) Keonakhon Vongsaynha	7. Nguyễn Dức Nhân
23	28 December 2019	Ngô Kiến Huy	4. Lê Trương Giang	1. Thu Tra and Minh Trâm	5. Vi Nguyễn Thiên Thương	2. Nguyễn Thị Mông Tuyển	3. (Laos) Keonakhon Vongsaynha	6. Dương Duy

2020 games
Episode		Guest artist	Mystery singers (In their respective numbers and aliases)					
#	Date	Guest artist	Elimination order					Winner
#	Date	Guest artist	Visual round		Lip sync round		Interrogation round	Winner
Special	4 January 2020	Hồ Việt Trung	6. Đăng Khả Hân	3. Châu Giang	4. Dương Ngọc Hả	2. Phạm Nhật Hy	5. Trinity Jinjin	1. Nguyễn Hải Đăng
Special	4 January 2020	Trang Pháp	6. Đăng Khả Hân	3. Châu Giang	4. Dương Ngọc Hả	2. Phạm Nhật Hy	5. Trinity Jinjin	7. Minh Vỹ
24	11 January 2020	Quốc Thiên	1. Nguyễn Ngọc Hưng	5. Huỳnh Công Ấn	2. Hiểu Toàn	3. Lê Khắc Giang	7. Na Yuu	4. Huỳnh Nguyên Phong
24	11 January 2020	Lê Bảo Bình	1. Nguyễn Ngọc Hưng	5. Huỳnh Công Ấn	2. Hiểu Toàn	3. Lê Khắc Giang	7. Na Yuu	6. Nguyễn Trung Đức
25	18 January 2020	Uyên Linh	4. Viễn Trinh	1. Quỳnh Trang	6. Alan Huỳnh	5. Lê Thị Quỳnh Châu	7. Yến Linh	3. Phạm Minh
25	18 January 2020	Mỹ Linh	4. Viễn Trinh	1. Quỳnh Trang	6. Alan Huỳnh	5. Lê Thị Quỳnh Châu	7. Yến Linh	2. Trần Quang Hủy

=== Panelists ===
Legend:
Regular panelist
Guest panelist

Apps		Panelists in attendance (Sorted by first appearance, with episode designations)
g#	p#	Panelists in attendance (Sorted by first appearance, with episode designations)
26	2	Trấn Thành and Trường Giang (1–25; sp. 1)
2	8	Nam Thư (1, 18); Puka (4, 11); BB Trần (4, 19); Mạc Văn Khoa and Quang Trung(5, 8); Midu (10, 17); Huyền Sâm (10, 23); Minh Tú (12, 15)
1	28	Anh Đức (1); Lê Dương Bảo Lâm and Minh Dự (2); Cát Phượng and Kiều Minh Tuấn (3); Lê Thúy and Harry Lu (6); Hải Triều and Thuận Nguyễn (7); Hứa Minh Đạt and Trương Quỳnh Anh (9); Chế Nguyễn Quỳnh Châu (11); Quách Ngọc Tuyên (12); Chí Tài and Lê Giang (13); Quỳnh Anh Shyn and Jun Vũ (14); Võ Hoàng Yến (15); Anh Thư and Khả Như (16); Tường Vi (17); POM (18); Liên Bỉnh Phát (19); Lê Lộc and Tuấn Trần (20); Cris Phan and ViruSs (21); Dennis Đặng and Vương Anh Tú (22); Hoàng Oanh (23); Thúy Nga and Phát La (sp. 1); Cao Thái Hà and Nhật Kim Anh (24); MLee and Nguyễn Hồng Thuận (25)
