= Hidden Voices (game show) season 5 =

Television game show season

Hidden Voices
- Season 5
- Starring: Trấn Thành; Trường Giang
- Hosted by: Đại Nghĩa
- Winners: Good singers: 15; Bad singers: 15
- No. of episodes: Regular: 14; Special: 1; Overall: 15

Release
- Original network: HTV7
- Original release: 28 June – 4 October 2020

Season chronology
- ← Previous; Season 4

The fifth season of the Vietnamese television mystery music game show Hidden Voices premiered on HTV7 on 28 June 2020. According to a vlog by director Khương Dừa in March 2020, this season was initially planned to suspend auditions and subsequently halt its production due to the COVID-19 pandemic.

== Gameplay ==
=== Format ===
Under the "battle format", two opposing guest artists eliminate one singer each during the proper game phase, and then keep one singer each to join the final performance. The winner is determined by the remaining mystery singers, who are chosen by opposing guest artists, as per specific winning condition depends on the outcome of their final performance, if:

1. One opposing guest artist kept a good singer and the other had a bad singer, or
2. Both opposing guest artists kept good or bad singers.

During the proper game phase, an eliminated good singer gets a consolation prize of D2,000,000. At the end of the game, if the last remaining mystery singer is good, the guest artist wins D50,000,000; in case of a tie, the same prize money is split, receiving D25,000,000 each. Both winning mystery singers, regardless of being good or bad, get D10,000,000 each.

=== Rounds ===
1. Visual round
  The guest artist is given some time to observe and examine each mystery singer based on their appearance. Afterward, a muted video of each mystery singer that reveals only 0.3 seconds of their singing voice is played as an additional hint.
2. Lip sync round
  Each mystery singer performs a lip sync to a song; good singers mime to a recording of their own, while bad singers mime to a backing track by another vocalist.
3. Interrogation round
  The guest artist may ask questions to the remaining mystery singers. Good singers are required to give truthful responses, while the bad singers must lie.

== Episodes ==
=== Guest artists ===
Legend:
Good singer
Bad singer

Episode		Guest artist (Note: Players' notes: For the returning guest artists (who also include foreigners and former good singers), names are displayed in italics.; For the mixed groups, names who identified as bad singers are displayed in italics.)	Mystery singers (In their respective numbers)					
#	Date	Guest artist	Elimination order					Winner
#	Date	Guest artist	Visual round		Lip sync round		Interrogation round	Winner
1	28 June 2020	Hòa Minzy	4. Phàng Dương Minh	5. Mina Young	6. Trần Minh Hoàng	3. Huỳnh Đông Nhi	1. Vô Thang Sang	7. Huỳnh Minh Anh
1	28 June 2020	Erik Thành	4. Phàng Dương Minh	5. Mina Young	6. Trần Minh Hoàng	3. Huỳnh Đông Nhi	1. Vô Thang Sang	2. Bùi Tuấn Anh
2	5 July 2020	Miu Lê	1. Phạm Lựa	3. Bảo Ngọc	5. Ngô Ngọc Thảo	7. Nguyễn Hoàng Nam	2. Bùi Công Duy	6. Nguyễn Lê Hoảng Long
2	5 July 2020	Lou Hoàng	1. Phạm Lựa	3. Bảo Ngọc	5. Ngô Ngọc Thảo	7. Nguyễn Hoàng Nam	2. Bùi Công Duy	4. Lê Công Đúng
3	12 July 2020	Siu Black	4. Phan Thị Hồng Cẩm	5. Lê Quỳnh Thy	3. Nguyễn Hải Long	2. Thạch Thanh Niên	6. Nguyễn Mình Trường	1. Lựu Chẩn Long
3	12 July 2020	Quang Hà	4. Phan Thị Hồng Cẩm	5. Lê Quỳnh Thy	3. Nguyễn Hải Long	2. Thạch Thanh Niên	6. Nguyễn Mình Trường	7. Nguyễn Thị Kim Trắng
4	19 July 2020	Thủy Tiên	2. Thiện Như	1. Nguyễn Lê Tuẫn Anh	7. Bùi Thanh Hiểu	4. Đinh Nhật Hào	3. Nguyễn Hạnh Trang	5. Lê Kim Quý
4	19 July 2020	Dương Triệu Vũ	2. Thiện Như	1. Nguyễn Lê Tuẫn Anh	7. Bùi Thanh Hiểu	4. Đinh Nhật Hào	3. Nguyễn Hạnh Trang	6. Nguyễn Hồng Sơn
Special	26 July 2020	Vũ Cát Tường	7. Quỳnh Lam	1. BB Trần	6. Phạm Đình Thái Ngân	2. Hồ Bích Trâm	4. Chung Thanh Phong	5. Nguyễn Đình Vũ
Special	26 July 2020	Tóc Tiên	7. Quỳnh Lam	1. BB Trần	6. Phạm Đình Thái Ngân	2. Hồ Bích Trâm	4. Chung Thanh Phong	3. Quang Đăng
5	2 August 2020	Amee	5. Trần Hổng Lĩnh	3. Phạm Quang Huy	6. Mình Mình Trung	7. Phan Lê Mi	2. Lê Quốc Hùng	4. Trần Phương Anh
5	2 August 2020	Kay Trần	5. Trần Hổng Lĩnh	3. Phạm Quang Huy	6. Mình Mình Trung	7. Phan Lê Mi	2. Lê Quốc Hùng	1. Lê Hoàng Tuyết Mình
6	9 August 2020	Nhật Kim Anh	4. Bích Ngọc	7. Hổng Lĩnh	1. Trần Trí Trung	2. Đức Anh	5. Yến Khoa	3. Huyễn Lĩnh
6	9 August 2020	Dương Ngọc Thái	4. Bích Ngọc	7. Hổng Lĩnh	1. Trần Trí Trung	2. Đức Anh	5. Yến Khoa	6. Thánh Điện
7	16 August 2020	Quân AP	5. Trương Nguyễn Huyền Anh	4. Bùi Thị Thảo Hiển	6. Lê Mình Hung	1. Nguyễn Trần Bảo Lâm	7. Giang Mỹ Dung	3. Trần Nguyễn Trí
7	16 August 2020	Thiều Bảo Trâm	5. Trương Nguyễn Huyền Anh	4. Bùi Thị Thảo Hiển	6. Lê Mình Hung	1. Nguyễn Trần Bảo Lâm	7. Giang Mỹ Dung	2. Lê Văn Trung Nguyên
8	23 August 2020	Trúc Nhân	3. Thanh Xuân	2. Phạm Đình Ân	5. Cao Thị Ngọc Lĩnh	7. Hoang Lan	6. Trần Đức Nguyên	4. Huỳnh Tỉnh Luân
8	23 August 2020	Ali Hoàng Dương	3. Thanh Xuân	2. Phạm Đình Ân	5. Cao Thị Ngọc Lĩnh	7. Hoang Lan	6. Trần Đức Nguyên	1. Sunny Đàn Ngọc
9	30 August 2020	Đoan Trang	4. Nguyễn Trần Thảo Vy	2. Nguyễn Hùng Phủ	5. Nguyễn Kim Thạch	1. Trần Thành Tâm	7. Nguyễn Ngọc Lan Lĩnh	3. Nguyễn Châu Nhỉ
9	30 August 2020	Bảo Thy	4. Nguyễn Trần Thảo Vy	2. Nguyễn Hùng Phủ	5. Nguyễn Kim Thạch	1. Trần Thành Tâm	7. Nguyễn Ngọc Lan Lĩnh	6. Đức Trưởng
10	6 September 2020	Chi Dân	4. Mình Trường	1. Nguyễn Khắc Triệu	2. Minh Diệu	6. Phạm Quyên Quyên	3. Hồ Tuấn Phúc	5. Ngọc Kara
10	6 September 2020	Bùi Lan Hương	4. Mình Trường	1. Nguyễn Khắc Triệu	2. Minh Diệu	6. Phạm Quyên Quyên	3. Hồ Tuấn Phúc	7. Huỳnh Phúc Khẳng
11	13 September 2020	Trung Quân	6. Huỳnh Thanh Phong	1. Nguyễn An An	5. Trần Mình Trang	2. Nguyễn Văn Thịnh	3. Nabee Nguyễn	4. Vương Bảo
11	13 September 2020	Bảo Anh	6. Huỳnh Thanh Phong	1. Nguyễn An An	5. Trần Mình Trang	2. Nguyễn Văn Thịnh	3. Nabee Nguyễn	7. Nguyễn Thị Bích Thu
12	20 September 2020	Đạt G	1. Trần Huỳnh Phúc	5. Nhật Đồng	6. Nguyễn Hoàng Khang	3. Việt Ngân	7. Ngọc Thảo	4. Nguyễn Ngọc Sơn
12	20 September 2020	Văn Mai Hương	1. Trần Huỳnh Phúc	5. Nhật Đồng	6. Nguyễn Hoàng Khang	3. Việt Ngân	7. Ngọc Thảo	2. Thu Trang
13	27 September 2020	Trịnh Thăng Bình	5. Dũng Cường	4. Trung Hiểu	1. Diệp Hoàng Phương Quyên	2. Nguyễn Vi	7. Lê Thu Hà	6. Nguyễn Thị Trúc Lĩnh
13	27 September 2020	Cao Thái Sơn	5. Dũng Cường	4. Trung Hiểu	1. Diệp Hoàng Phương Quyên	2. Nguyễn Vi	7. Lê Thu Hà	3. Nguyễn Phước Sang
14	4 October 2020	Khắc Việt	1. Võ Gia Hân	2. Quang Duy	6. Minh Kim	4. Vy Vy	3. Đặng Thị Kiều Uyển	5. Võ Hữu Nhân
14	4 October 2020	Dương Hoàng Yến	1. Võ Gia Hân	2. Quang Duy	6. Minh Kim	4. Vy Vy	3. Đặng Thị Kiều Uyển	7. Quỳnh Hoa

=== Panelists ===
Legend:
Regular panelist
Guest panelist

Apps		Panelists in attendance (Sorted by first appearance, with episode designations)
g#	p#	Panelists in attendance (Sorted by first appearance, with episode designations)
15	2	Trấn Thành and Trường Giang (1–14; sp. 1)
1	30	Mia Hoàng and Nguyễn Hồng Thuận (1); Huyền Sâm and La Thành (2); Nam Trung and Xuân Lan (3); Khánh Vân and Lê Công Vinh (4); Cris Phan and Puka (sp. 1); Song Luân and ViruSs (5); Lâm Khánh Chi and Vũ Hà (6); Hoàng Sơn and Tấn Beo (7); Otis Đỗ and Quang Trung (8); Mâu Thủy and Võ Hoàng Yến (9); Phương Trinh Jolie and Yoon Trần (10); Diệp Lâm Anh and Minh Triệu (11); Liêu Hà Trinh and Tiết Cương (12); Lệ Hằng and Lê Thị Hà Thu (13); Hải Triều and Mạc Văn Khoa (14)
