= Hidden Voices (game show) season 1 =

Television game show season

Hidden Voices
- Season 1
- Starring: Ốc Thanh Vân; Thu Trang; Trấn Thành; Trường Giang
- Hosted by: Đại Nghĩa
- Winners: Good singers: 20; Bad singers: 16
- No. of episodes: 18

Release
- Original network: HTV7
- Original release: 5 November 2016 – 4 March 2017

Season chronology
- Next → Season 2

The first season of the Vietnamese television mystery music game show Hidden Voices premiered on HTV7 on 5 November 2016.

== Gameplay ==
=== Format ===
Under the "battle format", two opposing guest artists eliminate one singer each during the proper game phase, and then keep one singer each to join the final performance. The winner is determined by the remaining mystery singers, who are chosen by opposing guest artists, as per specific winning condition depends on the outcome of their final performance, if:

1. One opposing guest artist kept a good singer and the other had a bad singer, or
2. Both opposing guest artists kept good or bad singers.

If the last remaining mystery singer is good, the guest artist wins D50,000,000; in case of a tie, the same prize money is split, receiving D25,000,000 each. Both winning mystery singers, regardless of being good or bad, get D10,000,000 each.

=== Rounds ===
1. Visual round
  The guest artist is given some time to observe and examine each mystery singer based on their appearance. Afterward, a muted video of each mystery singer that reveals only 0.3 seconds of their singing voice is played as an additional hint.
2. Lip sync round
  Each mystery singer performs a lip sync to a song; good singers mime to a recording of their own, while bad singers mime to a backing track by another vocalist.
3. Interrogation round
  The guest artist may ask questions to the remaining mystery singers. Good singers are required to give truthful responses, while the bad singers must lie.

== Episodes ==
Legend:
Good singer
Bad singer

2016 games
Episode		Guest artist (Note: Players' notes: For the returning guest artists (who also include foreigners and former good singers), names are displayed in italics.; For the mixed groups, names who identified as bad singers are displayed in italics.)	Mystery singers (In their respective numbers and aliases)					
#	Date	Guest artist	Elimination order					Winner
#	Date	Guest artist	Visual round		Lip sync round		Interrogation round	Winner
1	5 November 2016	Quang Vinh	5. Nguyễn Lê Minh Dương	1. Nguyễn Đại Anh Phúc	3. Nguyễn Minh Trí	7. Trần Phương Mai	2. Quỳnh Vy	6. Nguyễn Tường Thiên An
1	5 November 2016	Tóc Tiên	5. Nguyễn Lê Minh Dương	1. Nguyễn Đại Anh Phúc	3. Nguyễn Minh Trí	7. Trần Phương Mai	2. Quỳnh Vy	4. Hoàng Yên My
2	12 November 2016	Trịnh Thăng Bình	5. Nguyễn Quang Vũ	3. Nguyễn Văn Tâm	6. Lý Quyên Thành	2. Nguyễn Văn Đức	7. (South Korea) Hong Suk-ho	1. Châu Minh Chí
2	12 November 2016	Yến Trang	5. Nguyễn Quang Vũ	3. Nguyễn Văn Tâm	6. Lý Quyên Thành	2. Nguyễn Văn Đức	7. (South Korea) Hong Suk-ho	4. Huỳnh Thị Ngọc Huyền
3	19 November 2016	Quốc Thiên	1. Nguyễn Duy Thuận	6. Lê Minh Hùng	3. Vũ Văn Vĩnh	5. Trương Tấn Cường	4. Nguyễn Hoàng Khâu	7. Nguyễn Kha Thi
3	19 November 2016	Bích Phương	1. Nguyễn Duy Thuận	6. Lê Minh Hùng	3. Vũ Văn Vĩnh	5. Trương Tấn Cường	4. Nguyễn Hoàng Khâu	2. Trần Vi Thiện
4	26 November 2016	Chi Pu	4. Hồ Thanh Nhân	2. Nguyễn Thị Thu Trang	3. Phạm Phương Toàn	6. Jang Mi	5. Huỳnh Ngọc Khánh	1. Phan Thiên Phú
4	26 November 2016	Gil Lê	4. Hồ Thanh Nhân	2. Nguyễn Thị Thu Trang	3. Phạm Phương Toàn	6. Jang Mi	5. Huỳnh Ngọc Khánh	7. Nguyễn Dương Em
5	3 December 2016	Suni Hạ Linh	5. Nguyễn Hoàng Chương	6. Nam Phương	4. Đậu Thị Kim Hoàn	3. Trương Xuân Đạt	7. Nguyễn Thành Tuấn	2. Nguyễn Lê Mỹ Anh
5	3 December 2016	Ngô Kiến Huy	5. Nguyễn Hoàng Chương	6. Nam Phương	4. Đậu Thị Kim Hoàn	3. Trương Xuân Đạt	7. Nguyễn Thành Tuấn	1. An Nguyên
6	10 December 2016	Chi Dân	5. Sơn Phước Thuận	2. Nguyễn Trần Minh Tân	1. Thái Hoàng	3. Phạm Thị Thu Thảo	7. Phạm Bùi Trung Hậu	4. Đỗ Thành Nghiệp
6	10 December 2016	Võ Hạ Trâm	5. Sơn Phước Thuận	2. Nguyễn Trần Minh Tân	1. Thái Hoàng	3. Phạm Thị Thu Thảo	7. Phạm Bùi Trung Hậu	6. Phương Minh
7	17 December 2016	Bảo Thy	7. Lương Gia Tường	2. Trần Ngọc Chí Tâm	1. Phan Phạm Hoàng Minh	6. Bùi Quang Tấn	3. Lưu Gia Tài	5. Vân Phi Yến
7	17 December 2016	Sơn Thạch (365daband) (Note: Season highlight: 365daband designated as a group, in which different members playing on subsequent games are actually returned; Isaac Phạm, Jun Phạm, Sơn Thạch, Tronie Ngô, and Will Nguyễn have been played.)	7. Lương Gia Tường	2. Trần Ngọc Chí Tâm	1. Phan Phạm Hoàng Minh	6. Bùi Quang Tấn	3. Lưu Gia Tài	4. Đỗ Anh Khoa
8	24 December 2016	Hương Tràm	3. Nguyễn Lê Việt Hùng	7. Nguyễn Minh Hoàng	5. Nguyễn Đoàn Thành	4. Trương Xuân Phương	1. Phạm Trường Giang	2. Lương Thị Tuyết Minh
8	24 December 2016	Cao Thái Sơn	3. Nguyễn Lê Việt Hùng	7. Nguyễn Minh Hoàng	5. Nguyễn Đoàn Thành	4. Trương Xuân Phương	1. Phạm Trường Giang	6. Lê Thị Hảo
9	31 December 2016	Hari Won	6. Nguyễn Trường Tín	1. Sakyrin	5. Lương Nguyễn Hải Vinh	2. Lê Hồ Minh Dương	4. Hà Phan Minh Nguyệt	7. Bùi Thị Thúy Vi
9	31 December 2016	Trúc Nhân	6. Nguyễn Trường Tín	1. Sakyrin	5. Lương Nguyễn Hải Vinh	2. Lê Hồ Minh Dương	4. Hà Phan Minh Nguyệt	3. Vũ Thị Châu

2017 games
Episode		Guest artist	Mystery singers (In their respective numbers and aliases)					
#	Date	Guest artist	Elimination order					Winner
#	Date	Guest artist	Visual round		Lip sync round		Interrogation round	Winner
10	7 January 2017	Dương Triệu Vũ	2. Trần Bảo Châu	5. Lê Thanh Hải	1. Nguyễn Tấn Đạt	4. Nguyễn Ngọc Sơn	3. Đỗ Quyên	7. Nguyễn Việt Tùng
10	7 January 2017	Bảo Anh	2. Trần Bảo Châu	5. Lê Thanh Hải	1. Nguyễn Tấn Đạt	4. Nguyễn Ngọc Sơn	3. Đỗ Quyên	6. Nguyễn Thị Tuyết Trinh
11	14 January 2017	Lương Bích Hữu	3. Trần Gia Bắc	2. Mai Phúc Duy	7. Trịnh Thị Thu Hương	1. Nguyễn Thị Thúy Hằng	6. Đinh Vĩnh Khang	5. Tùng Anh
11	14 January 2017	Hồ Quang Hiếu	3. Trần Gia Bắc	2. Mai Phúc Duy	7. Trịnh Thị Thu Hương	1. Nguyễn Thị Thúy Hằng	6. Đinh Vĩnh Khang	4. Thanh Nguyễn
12	21 January 2017	Đại Nhân	4. Nguyễn Thị Khánh Ly	3. Trần Trung Thuận	1. Nguyễn Hoàng Tuấn	5. Trương Trí Trung	7. Lê Nguyễn Quốc Vũ	6. Nguyễn Phúc Lợi
12	21 January 2017	Hương Giang	4. Nguyễn Thị Khánh Ly	3. Trần Trung Thuận	1. Nguyễn Hoàng Tuấn	5. Trương Trí Trung	7. Lê Nguyễn Quốc Vũ	2. Ngọc Trầm
13	28 January 2017	Lê Giang	5. Hứa Thông	6. Lê Phương Uyên	1. Hoàng Khởi	2. Lê Hồng Trang	7. Tống Thị Yên Nhi	4. Lê Văn Hậu
13	28 January 2017	Hữu Quốc	5. Hứa Thông	6. Lê Phương Uyên	1. Hoàng Khởi	2. Lê Hồng Trang	7. Tống Thị Yên Nhi	3. Trịnh Thị Hoài Lang
14	4 February 2017	Thái Trinh	5. Lưu Đăng Khoa	3. Tăng Phúc	4. Nguyễn Trung Tín	6. Nguyễn Hải Ninh	7. Võ Trọng Bổn	2. Lương Thị Ngọc Nguyên
14	4 February 2017	Bùi Anh Tuấn	5. Lưu Đăng Khoa	3. Tăng Phúc	4. Nguyễn Trung Tín	6. Nguyễn Hải Ninh	7. Võ Trọng Bổn	1. Mai Hồng Phát
15	11 February 2017	Chí Thiện	2. Lâm Tân Phát	5. Trần Thị Minh Giang	6. Phạm Huỳnh Hiếu Thiện	3. Nguyễn Kim Khánh	7. Lê Thị Ly Na	4. Võ Đức Trí
15	11 February 2017	Hoàng Yến Chibi	2. Lâm Tân Phát	5. Trần Thị Minh Giang	6. Phạm Huỳnh Hiếu Thiện	3. Nguyễn Kim Khánh	7. Lê Thị Ly Na	1. Nguyễn Thùy Diệu Tuyết
16	18 February 2017	Phạm Hồng Phước	1. Đoàn Tuấn	7. Vũ Thắng	4. Vũ Thị Thùy Nhung	3. Trần Hoài Phong	5. Phạm Hoàn Thành	6. Phan Thị Hồng Diễm
16	18 February 2017	Ái Phương	1. Đoàn Tuấn	7. Vũ Thắng	4. Vũ Thị Thùy Nhung	3. Trần Hoài Phong	5. Phạm Hoàn Thành	2. Vũ Thị Vân Mơ
17	25 February 2017	Nguyễn Hải Phong	3. Ngô Anh Dũng	4. Võ Hạ Trinh	2. Nguyễn Phước Khánh	1. Nguyễn Thị Thùy Linh	6. Lê Thành Vũ	7. Huỳnh Thị Chúc Mai
17	25 February 2017	Thu Minh	3. Ngô Anh Dũng	4. Võ Hạ Trinh	2. Nguyễn Phước Khánh	1. Nguyễn Thị Thùy Linh	6. Lê Thành Vũ	5. Trần Thị Thúy Tiên
18	4 March 2017	Bạch Công Khanh	1. Dương Minh Thái	3. Trần Hoàng Gia An	5. Lý Yến Phương	4. Nguyễn Hoàng Sang	2. Lê Thị Kim Na	6. Nguyễn Phạm Tuấn Anh
18	4 March 2017	Hòa Minzy	1. Dương Minh Thái	3. Trần Hoàng Gia An	5. Lý Yến Phương	4. Nguyễn Hoàng Sang	2. Lê Thị Kim Na	7. Jessica Lê
