= Hidden Voices (game show) season 2 =

Television game show season

Hidden Voices
- Season 2
- Starring: Ốc Thanh Vân; Thu Trang; Trấn Thành; Trường Giang
- Hosted by: Đại Nghĩa
- Winners: Good singers: 19; Bad singers: 17
- No. of episodes: 18

Release
- Original network: HTV7
- Original release: 7 October 2017 – 4 February 2018

Season chronology
- ← Previous; Season 1 Next → Season 3

The second season of the Vietnamese television mystery music game show Hidden Voices premiered on HTV7 on 7 October 2017.

== Gameplay ==
=== Format ===
Under the "battle format", two opposing guest artists eliminate one singer each during the proper game phase, and then keep one singer each to join the final performance. The winner is determined by the remaining mystery singers, who are chosen by opposing guest artists, as per specific winning condition depends on the outcome of their final performance, if:

1. One opposing guest artist kept a good singer and the other had a bad singer, or
2. Both opposing guest artists kept good or bad singers.

If the last remaining mystery singer is good, the guest artist wins D50,000,000; in case of a tie, the same prize money is split, receiving D25,000,000 each. Both winning mystery singers, regardless of being good or bad, get D10,000,000 each.

=== Rounds ===
1. Visual round
  The guest artist is given some time to observe and examine each mystery singer based on their appearance. Afterward, a muted video of each mystery singer that reveals only 0.3 seconds of their singing voice is played as an additional hint.
2. Lip sync round
  Each mystery singer performs a lip sync to a song; good singers mime to a recording of their own, while bad singers mime to a backing track by another vocalist.
3. Talent round
  The guest artist must describe one of the mystery singer's other talents, except "singing" itself. This may not be related to the "stage of truth", but depends on their identity.

== Episodes ==
| Legend: |
Good singer
Bad singer

2017 games
| Episode | | Guest artist (Note: Players' notes: For the returning guest artists (who also include foreigners and former good singers), names are displayed in italics.; For the mixed groups, names who identified as bad singers are displayed in italics.) | Mystery singers (In their respective numbers and aliases) | | | | | |
| # | Date | Guest artist | Elimination order | | | | | Winner |
| # | Date | Guest artist | Visual round | | Lip sync round | | Talent round | Winner |
|---|---|---|---|---|---|---|---|---|
| 1 | 7 October 2017 | Văn Mai Hương | 4. Phạm Thị Ngọc Điệp | 3. Trương Trấn Anh Duy | 7. Thiên Hương | 1. Lương Trấn Đài Nguyên | 5. Basker Ngọc Tân | 6. Phan Hoàng Uyên Thy |
| 1 | 7 October 2017 | Trung Quân | 4. Phạm Thị Ngọc Điệp | 3. Trương Trấn Anh Duy | 7. Thiên Hương | 1. Lương Trấn Đài Nguyên | 5. Basker Ngọc Tân | 2. Vũ Quốc Dăng |
| 2 | 14 October 2017 | Jun Phạm (365daband) (Note: Season highlight: 365daband designated as a group, in which different members playing on subsequent games are actually returned; Isaac Phạm, Jun Phạm, Sơn Thạch, Tronie Ngô, and Will Nguyễn have been played.) | 2. Trấn Mai Thảo Hiến | 1. Nguyễn Ny | 4. Nguyễn Viết Tán | 5. Lê Thị Thu Trang | 7. Nguyễn Phi Long | 3. Trấn Duy Khang |
| 2 | 14 October 2017 | Miu Lê | 2. Trấn Mai Thảo Hiến | 1. Nguyễn Ny | 4. Nguyễn Viết Tán | 5. Lê Thị Thu Trang | 7. Nguyễn Phi Long | 6. Nguyễn Gia Hẳn |
| 3 | 21 October 2017 | Thanh Duy | 4. Hoàng Bả Đô | 2. Trọng Nghi | 1. Huề Phát | 7. Trấn Phong | 3. Huỳnh Phương Duy | 6. Hoải Minh |
| 3 | 21 October 2017 | Tronie Ngô (365daband) | 4. Hoàng Bả Đô | 2. Trọng Nghi | 1. Huề Phát | 7. Trấn Phong | 3. Huỳnh Phương Duy | 5. Nguyễn Đinh Quốc Khánh |
| 4 | 28 October 2017 | Gin Tuấn Kiệt | 3. Kiểu Phan Quốc Lăn | 1. Lê Thánh Vỹ | 4. Đặng Nam Anh | 6. Huỳnh Thị Tú Trinh | 2. Lê Nhật Hòa | 5. Võ Đăng Khoa |
| 4 | 28 October 2017 | Anh Tú | 3. Kiểu Phan Quốc Lăn | 1. Lê Thánh Vỹ | 4. Đặng Nam Anh | 6. Huỳnh Thị Tú Trinh | 2. Lê Nhật Hòa | 7. Nguyễn Đức Huy Hoàng |
| 5 | 4 November 2017 | Lam Trường | 7. Trấn Minh Nhật | 4. Hoàng Hà | 6. Hà Quốc Dạt | 1. Phi Đẳng | 5. Nguyễn Lê Nhung | 3. Ngọc Long |
| 5 | 4 November 2017 | Phương Thanh | 7. Trấn Minh Nhật | 4. Hoàng Hà | 6. Hà Quốc Dạt | 1. Phi Đẳng | 5. Nguyễn Lê Nhung | 2. Như Khánh |
| 6 | 11 November 2017 | Bích Phương | 1. Xuẩn Mai | 3. Võ Thảnh Tài | 4. Trát Thành Hiệp | 6. Tú Trinh | 7. Anh Đức | 5. Sandra Amira |
| 6 | 11 November 2017 | Đức Phúc | 1. Xuẩn Mai | 3. Võ Thảnh Tài | 4. Trát Thành Hiệp | 6. Tú Trinh | 7. Anh Đức | 2. Lê Đức Tri |
| 7 | 18 November 2017 | Thu Thủy | 1. Bùi Ngọc Hưng | 3. Cao Văn Phương | 4. Đỗ Hoài Bào | 7. Nguyễn Phú Thịnh | 2. Đặng Thị Thương | 5. Gia Hân |
| 7 | 18 November 2017 | Ưng Hoàng Phúc | 1. Bùi Ngọc Hưng | 3. Cao Văn Phương | 4. Đỗ Hoài Bào | 7. Nguyễn Phú Thịnh | 2. Đặng Thị Thương | 6. Phạm Dung |
| 8 | 25 November 2017 | Trịnh Thăng Bình | 5. Dương Ảnh Nga | 1. Hoài Phương | 4. Trấn Thị Kim Phúc | 2. Huỳnh Thị Thu Lương | 6. Nguyễn Thị Như Quỳnh | 3. Nguyễn Hoàng Ngọc Bích |
| 8 | 25 November 2017 | Yến Nhi | 5. Dương Ảnh Nga | 1. Hoài Phương | 4. Trấn Thị Kim Phúc | 2. Huỳnh Thị Thu Lương | 6. Nguyễn Thị Như Quỳnh | 7. Tuyết Nga |
| 9 | 2 December 2017 | Min | 3. Quỳnh Như | 2. Kim Dung | 6. Nguyễn Ngọc Cẩm Nhung | 4. Hà Toàn | 1. Nhật Minh | 5. Lê Hải Yến |
| 9 | 2 December 2017 | Will Nguyễn (365daband) | 3. Quỳnh Như | 2. Kim Dung | 6. Nguyễn Ngọc Cẩm Nhung | 4. Hà Toàn | 1. Nhật Minh | 7. Thanh Ngân |
| 10 | 9 December 2017 | Only C | 3. Yến Nhi | 4. Tấn Tải | 6. Ấu Phong | 1. Trăn Trọng Nam | 5. Thanh Sang | 7. Võ Nghi Binh |
| 10 | 9 December 2017 | Phương Trinh Jolie | 3. Yến Nhi | 4. Tấn Tải | 6. Ấu Phong | 1. Trăn Trọng Nam | 5. Thanh Sang | 2. Phương Thảo |
| 11 | 16 December 2017 | Khổng Tú Quỳnh | 4. Tô Luyt | 7. Trấn Thị Ngọc Châu | 3. Thanh Trúc | 1. Bùi Ánh Quỳnh | 5. Huy Bào | 2. Nhật Tân |
| 11 | 16 December 2017 | Ngô Kiến Huy | 4. Tô Luyt | 7. Trấn Thị Ngọc Châu | 3. Thanh Trúc | 1. Bùi Ánh Quỳnh | 5. Huy Bào | 6. Đinh Quân |
| 12 | 23 December 2017 | Giang Hồng Ngọc | 4. Phạm Ngọc Nhân | 2. Phạm Ngọc Cưỡng | 6. Trân Mỹ Ngọc | 5. Thu Hằng | 3. Nguyễn Mỹ Duyên | 7. Đinh Chí Cảnh |
| 12 | 23 December 2017 | Ưng Đại Vệ | 4. Phạm Ngọc Nhân | 2. Phạm Ngọc Cưỡng | 6. Trân Mỹ Ngọc | 5. Thu Hằng | 3. Nguyễn Mỹ Duyên | 1. Ngọc Huỳnh |
| 13 | 30 December 2017 | Hoài Lâm | 2. Khánh Ngọc | 5. Trần Kim Khánh | 1. Phan Bảo Khánh | 3. Quang Nhật | 6. Giang Thúy Viên | 7. Nguyễn Hoài Vũ |
| 13 | 30 December 2017 | Vũ Cát Tường | 2. Khánh Ngọc | 5. Trần Kim Khánh | 1. Phan Bảo Khánh | 3. Quang Nhật | 6. Giang Thúy Viên | 4. An Nhiên |

2018 games
| Episode | | Guest artist | Mystery singers (In their respective numbers and aliases) | | | | | |
| # | Date | Guest artist | Elimination order | | | | | Winner |
| # | Date | Guest artist | Visual round | | Lip sync round | | Talent round | Winner |
|---|---|---|---|---|---|---|---|---|
| 14 | 6 January 2018 | Tiêu Châu Như Quỳnh | 5. Việt Thắng | 1. Quỳnh Hương | 7. Vĩnh Nghi | 3. Thành Nhân | 6. Trương Thị Thùy Trang | 2. Minh Quân |
| 14 | 6 January 2018 | Châu Đăng Khoa | 5. Việt Thắng | 1. Quỳnh Hương | 7. Vĩnh Nghi | 3. Thành Nhân | 6. Trương Thị Thùy Trang | 4. Phương Hạnh |
| 15 | 13 January 2018 | Vicky Nhung | 5. Triệu Ánh Xuân | 1. Lê Thúy Chi | 7. Thế Nhân | 3. Phương Thảo | 2. Nguyễn Bảo Lộc | 4. Lê Huấn |
| 15 | 13 January 2018 | Hoàng Tôn | 5. Triệu Ánh Xuân | 1. Lê Thúy Chi | 7. Thế Nhân | 3. Phương Thảo | 2. Nguyễn Bảo Lộc | 6. Hồ Thu |
| 16 | 20 January 2017 | Đoan Trang | 3. Kim Anh | 5. Dương Viết Lâm | 1. Nguyễn Kim Phú | 4. Minh Quang | 2. Ngọc Ý | 6. Thục Văn |
| 16 | 20 January 2017 | Đăng Khôi | 3. Kim Anh | 5. Dương Viết Lâm | 1. Nguyễn Kim Phú | 4. Minh Quang | 2. Ngọc Ý | 7. Nguyễn Văn Toản |
| 17 | 27 January 2018 | Khắc Việt | 5. Ka Ư | 6. Hà Cảnh | 1. Bảo Nguyên | 7. Điệp Phương | 2. Kim Ngân | 4. Chu Thúy Quỳnh |
| 17 | 27 January 2018 | Trà My | 5. Ka Ư | 6. Hà Cảnh | 1. Bảo Nguyên | 7. Điệp Phương | 2. Kim Ngân | 3. Nguyễn Tân Phat |
| 18 | 3 February 2018 | Thanh Ngọc | 3. Ngọc Diệp | 5. Diễm Hương | 1. Võ Huỳnh Tấn Sang | 7. Hoài Nam | 4. Âu Thi | 2. Hải Yến |
| 18 | 3 February 2018 | Nhật Tinh Anh | 3. Ngọc Diệp | 5. Diễm Hương | 1. Võ Huỳnh Tấn Sang | 7. Hoài Nam | 4. Âu Thi | 6. Ba Duy |
