= Hidden Voices (game show) season 3 =

Television game show season

Hidden Voices
- Season 3
- Starring: Trấn Thành; Trường Giang
- Hosted by: Đại Nghĩa
- Winners: Good singers: 17; Bad singers: 13
- No. of episodes: 15

Release
- Original network: HTV7
- Original release: 28 July – 3 November 2018

Season chronology
- ← Previous; Season 2 Next → Season 4

The third season of the Vietnamese television mystery music game show Hidden Voices premiered on HTV7 on 28 July 2018.

== Gameplay ==
=== Format ===
Under the "battle format", two opposing guest artists eliminate one singer each during the proper game phase, and then keep one singer each to join the final performance. The winner is determined by the remaining mystery singers, who are chosen by opposing guest artists, as per specific winning condition depends on the outcome of their final performance, if:

1. One opposing guest artist kept a good singer and the other had a bad singer, or
2. Both opposing guest artists kept good or bad singers.

If the last remaining mystery singer is good, the guest artist wins D50,000,000; in case of a tie, the same prize money is split, receiving D25,000,000 each. Both winning mystery singers, regardless of being good or bad, get D10,000,000 each.

=== Rounds ===
1. Visual round
  The guest artist is given some time to observe and examine each mystery singer based on their appearance. Afterward, a muted video of each mystery singer that reveals only 0.3 seconds of their singing voice is played as an additional hint.
2. Lip sync round
  Each mystery singer performs a lip sync to a song; good singers mime to a recording of their own, while bad singers mime to a backing track by another vocalist.
3. Interrogation round
  The guest artist may ask questions to the remaining mystery singers. Good singers are required to give truthful responses, while the bad singers must lie.

== Episodes ==
=== Guest artists ===
Legend:
Good singer
Bad singer

Episode		Guest artist (Note: Players' notes: For the returning guest artists (who also include foreigners and former good singers), names are displayed in italics.; For the mixed groups, names who identified as bad singers are displayed in italics.)	Mystery singers (In their respective numbers and aliases)					
#	Date	Guest artist	Elimination order					Winner
#	Date	Guest artist	Visual round		Lip sync round		Interrogation round	Winner
1	28 July 2018	Hòa Minzy	1. Văn Tài	6. Ái Vy	5. Kim Phúc	4. Minh Tưởng	7. Tiền Đóng	2. Lê Hương
1	28 July 2018	Erik Thành	1. Văn Tài	6. Ái Vy	5. Kim Phúc	4. Minh Tưởng	7. Tiền Đóng	3. Tùng Hiểu
2	4 August 2018	Hoàng Yến Chibi	1. Thanh Thức	7. Minh Tròn	6. Cherry Quỳnh	5. Văn Thuận	4. Mẫn Nghi	2. Tú Uyên
2	4 August 2018	Gin Tuấn Kiệt	1. Thanh Thức	7. Minh Tròn	6. Cherry Quỳnh	5. Văn Thuận	4. Mẫn Nghi	3. Duy Minh
3	11 August 2018	Anh Tú	5. Văn Khoa	2. Quang Hùng	3. Tú Trâm	4. Tuyết Nhung	1. Xuân Cương	6. Văn Quân
3	11 August 2018	Hari Won	5. Văn Khoa	2. Quang Hùng	3. Tú Trâm	4. Tuyết Nhung	1. Xuân Cương	7. Thủy Tiên
4	18 August 2018	Bùi Anh Tuấn	3. Duy Tuấn	6. Hoàng Nhi	2. Lan Thanh	4. Đức Tuấn	1. Tấn Giàu	6. Thành An
4	18 August 2018	Hương Tràm	3. Duy Tuấn	6. Hoàng Nhi	2. Lan Thanh	4. Đức Tuấn	1. Tấn Giàu	7. Cấm Tú
5	25 August 2018	Trang Pháp	4. Tuyết Trinh	2. Minh Quyền	5. Duy Ân	6. Minh Tuyển	7. Hồng Hạnh	1. Bảo Quyên
5	25 August 2018	Mai Tiến Dũng	4. Tuyết Trinh	2. Minh Quyền	5. Duy Ân	6. Minh Tuyển	7. Hồng Hạnh	3. Minh Quân
6	1 September 2018	Hồng Ngọc	3. Thanh Trọng	6. Thảo Ngạn	5. Thanh Quân	4. Huỳnh Thi	2. Phúc Thịnh	7. Minh Quý
6	1 September 2018	Đan Trường	3. Thanh Trọng	6. Thảo Ngạn	5. Thanh Quân	4. Huỳnh Thi	2. Phúc Thịnh	1. Chí Thiện
7	8 September 2018	Han Sara	3. Phương Uyên	1. Hổng Phước	4. Nhật Trường	5. Thùy Trang	2. Lê Quốc Anh	6. Như Thùy
7	8 September 2018	Karik	3. Phương Uyên	1. Hổng Phước	4. Nhật Trường	5. Thùy Trang	2. Lê Quốc Anh	7. Phú Quốc
8	15 September 2018	Hương Giang	7. Chí Cưỡng	2. Đăng Khoa	4. Võ Phụng	6. Hồ Bảo Thi	1. Lê Diễm	3. Thanh Yu
8	15 September 2018	Kay Trần	7. Chí Cưỡng	2. Đăng Khoa	4. Võ Phụng	6. Hồ Bảo Thi	1. Lê Diễm	5. Huỳnh Tú
9	22 September 2018	Gil Lê	4. Dương Bình	2. Ngô Thị Thùy	1. Thành Công	3. Huỳnh Luận	7. Thùy Dương	5. Kim Linh
9	22 September 2018	Isaac Phạm (365daband) (Note: Season highlights: 365daband designated as a group, in which different members playing on subsequent games are actually returned; Isaac Phạm, Jun Phạm, Sơn Thạch, Tronie Ngô, and Will Nguyễn have been played.; Good singer Jang Mi (ep. 13) also returned, playing as a guest artist.)	4. Dương Bình	2. Ngô Thị Thùy	1. Thành Công	3. Huỳnh Luận	7. Thùy Dương	6. Thế Hà
10	29 September 2018	Kim Tử Long	5. Văn Đông	3. Minh Đạt	6. Đinh Trường	7. Kiều Ngân	4. Duy Luân	1. Tuyết Nhung
10	29 September 2018	Thoại Mỹ	5. Văn Đông	3. Minh Đạt	6. Đinh Trường	7. Kiều Ngân	4. Duy Luân	2. Hoàng Thức
11	6 October 2018	Hiền Hồ	1. Thanh Thảo	5. Văn Quang	3. Diệu Ly	4. Thùy Trang	6. Ngọc Thông	2. Yến Mỹ
11	6 October 2018	Phan Mạnh Quỳnh	1. Thanh Thảo	5. Văn Quang	3. Diệu Ly	4. Thùy Trang	6. Ngọc Thông	7. Minh Trí
12	13 October 2018	Chi Dân	3. Thanh Liêm	4. Tuyết Mai	1. Minh Tuân	7. Hải Phú	6. Nguyệt Anh	5. Huy Phúc
12	13 October 2018	Phạm Quỳnh Anh	3. Thanh Liêm	4. Tuyết Mai	1. Minh Tuân	7. Hải Phú	6. Nguyệt Anh	2. Mỹ Linh
13	20 October 2018	Sơn Thạch (365daband)	5. Elsa Nguyễn	4. Lưu Quốc Tuấn	3. Bảo Hân	2. Nguyễn Mạch Xuân Duyên	1. Đào Bá Lộc	6. Trần Hoàng Anh Tuấn
13	20 October 2018	Jang Mi	5. Elsa Nguyễn	4. Lưu Quốc Tuấn	3. Bảo Hân	2. Nguyễn Mạch Xuân Duyên	1. Đào Bá Lộc	7. Young Ju
14	27 October 2018	Nam Cường	2. Duy Hải	7. Quang Khiêm	5. Bảo Đăng	1. Bích Trâm	6. Thiên Lý	3. Tiên Linh
14	27 October 2018	Phương Trinh Jolie	2. Duy Hải	7. Quang Khiêm	5. Bảo Đăng	1. Bích Trâm	6. Thiên Lý	4. Thụy Ngân
15	3 November 2018	Thanh Duy	1. Khánh Minh	7. Tấn Kha	4. Kỳ Anh	3. Duy Thoại	5. Thanh Tảo	6. Vương Thanh
15	3 November 2018	Đại Nhân	1. Khánh Minh	7. Tấn Kha	4. Kỳ Anh	3. Duy Thoại	5. Thanh Tảo	2. Minh Huy

=== Panelists ===
Legend:
Regular panelist
Guest panelist

Apps		Panelists in attendance (Sorted by first appearance, with episode designations)
g#	p#	Panelists in attendance (Sorted by first appearance, with episode designations)
15	2	Trấn Thành and Trường Giang (1–15)
2	8	Anh Đức (1, 11); Nam Thư (1, 12); Diệu Nhi (2, 14); Huỳnh Lập (3, 12); Puka (5, 11); Huyền Sâm (Note: Panelists' note: During the 7th episode, both Huyền Sâm and Mia Hoàng switched assignments on their opposing teams.) (7, 14); Cát Phượng and Kiều Minh Tuấn (10, 15)
1	14	Thuận Nguyễn (2); Khả Như (3); Lâm Vỹ Dạ and Mai Tài Phến (4); Lê Dương Bảo Lâm (5); Lê Giang and Việt Trinh (6); Mia Hoàng (7); Misthy and PewPew (8); BB Trần and Hải Triều (9); Ninh Dương Lan Ngọc and Xuân Nghị (13)
