= HTV3 =

Vietnamese television channel

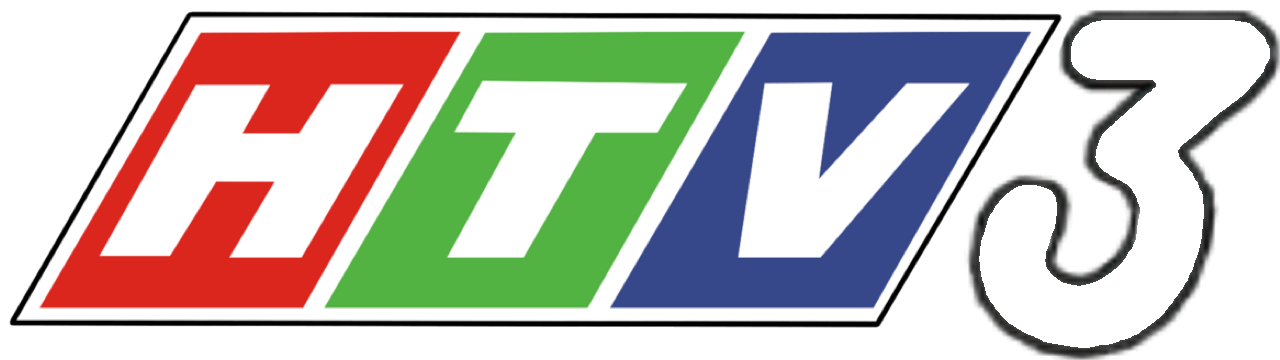
- Country: Vietnam
- Broadcast area: Asia-Pacific (via Satellite); Worldwide (via IPTV and Internet since 2016)
- Headquarters: Ho Chi Minh City

Programming
- Language: Vietnamese
- Picture format: 1080i HDTV

Ownership
- Owner: Ho Chi Minh City Television
- Sister channels: HTV Channel: HTV1; HTV2 - Vie Channel; HTV3; HTV4; HTV5 - Bchannel; HTV7; HTV9; HTV Thể Thao; HTV Co.op; HTVC channels: HTVC Thuần Việt; HTVC Gia đình HTVC Phụ Nữ; HTVC Ca nhạc HTVC Phim; HTVC Du lịch và Cuộc sống HTVC+

History
- Launched: October 1, 2003; 23 years ago
- Former names: HTV3 Digital (2003-2007); HTV3 DreamsTV (2017-2022)

Links
- Website: https://www.htv.com.vn

Availability

Terrestrial
- AVG: Channel 15

HTV3 (previously known as HTV3 DreamsTV until 2022) is a Vietnamese free-to-air channel of Ho Chi Minh City Television in Vietnam and used to be administered by Tri Viet Media Corporation (TVM Corp.), TTN Media and Purpose Media. Originally, HTV3 aired shows for youth and later children's audiences. HTV3 always has the copyright from the creator and production of all the shows broadcast. It is broadcast 24 hours a day on VTC, K+, AVG television services in Vietnam.

== History ==
HTV3 channel was set up in 2004 by Ho Chi Minh City Television (HTV) with blocks for children. In 2008, HTV was collaborated with Tri Viet Media Corporation (TVM Corp.) to develop the channel. Between 2015 and 2016, HTV3 was transferred to TTN Media. From 2017 to 2022, Purpose Media took over the channel. Since 1 July 2017, DreamsTV was created for the broadcasts.

From 1 November 2022, HTV3 officially stopped broadcasting the DreamsTV brand and was returned to Ho Chi Minh City Television for management. After this point, the channel mainly replays programs from other HTV channels such as HTV7 or HTV9.
