= Phương Thanh =

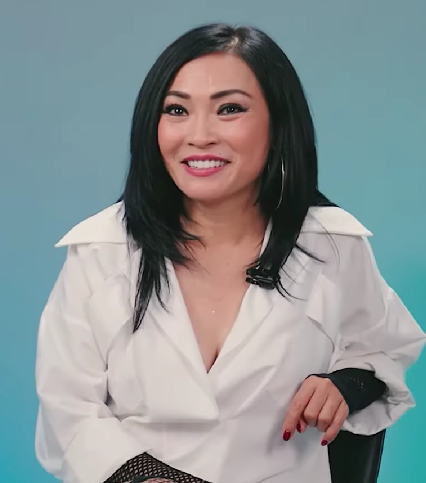
- Phương Thanh in 2024

Background information
- Born: Bùi Thị Phương Thanh; 27 April 1973 (age 53)
- Origin: Nông Cống, Thanh Hóa, North Vietnam
- Genre: Pop
- Instrument: Vocals

Bùi Thị Phương Thanh (born 27 April 1973) is a Vietnamese contemporary singer.

== Background ==
Thanh was born in a rural part of the Thanh Hóa Province, Vietnam.

Until the end of 1991, Thanh lived in obscurity. Her luck changed when a friend invited her to work for the youth movement and join the Labor Theatre House, a Vietnamese club for young singers.

== Discography ==
Studio albums

- Trái tim không ngủ yên (1997)
- Một thời đã xa (1999)
- Lang thang - Tình 2000 (1999)
- Tiếng rao (2000)
- Kẻ hát rong (2000)
- Nếu như - Trót yêu (2001)
- Khi giấc mơ về (2002)
- Hãy để em ra đi - Vì em yêu anh (2003)
- Quay về ngày xưa (2004)
- Thương một người (2005)
- Tìm lại lời thề (2006)
- Sang mùa (2007)
- Chanh bolero (2007)
- Nào có ai biết (2010)
- Con ốc bươu (2011)
- Mùa xuân đầu tiên (2015)
- Tâm sự ngày đông (2016)
- Về quê (2016)

Compilation albums

- The best tình 2010 (2010)

EPs

- Giã từ dĩ vãng (1998)
- Quay về đây - Mèo hoang (2011)

Single

- Thành phố gì kỳ (17/12/2021)
- Xuân hạ thu đông 39 (14/2/2022)

Video albums

- Live Show 2002 (2002)
- Chanh's Show (2007)
- Mưa Show (2008)

== TV shows ==
Year	Program	Role	Notes
2017	Giọng ải giọng ai	Herself	Guest artist, season 2
2019	Giọng ải giọng ai	Herself	Guest artist, season 4

== In popular culture ==
- Her song Chia tay trong mưa (literally Farewell in the rain), which was the Vietnamese remake of 1986 song The Rain, was later featured in the 2026 Rockstar's video game Grand Theft Auto VI as the song in the fictional Kaleidoscope FM radio station. This remake was very famous when YouTuber IShowSpeed found it while playing the game.
