= Hidden Voices (game show) =

Vietnamese television game show

- Vietnamese: Giọng ải giọng ai
- Literally: Who is that voice?
- Genre: Game show
- Directed by: Khương Dừa
- Presented by: Đại Nghĩa
- Starring: The celebrity panelists (see cast)
- Country of origin: Vietnam
- Original language: Vietnamese
- No. of seasons: 5
- No. of episodes: Regular: 90; Special: 2; Overall: 92

Production
- Producer: Trần Thế Khương
- Camera setup: Multi-camera
- Production companies: Điền Quân Media; Color Entertainment; Pixel Factory

Original release
- Network: HTV7
- Release: 5 November 2016 – 4 October 2020

Related
- I Can See Your Voice franchise

Hidden Voices (also known by its main title Giọng ải giọng ai, lit. 'Who is that voice?'; abbreviated as GAGA) is a Vietnamese television mystery music game show, featuring its "battle format" where two opposing guest artists attempt to eliminate bad singers from the group, until the last mystery singers remain for separate duet performances. It first aired on HTV7 on 5 November 2016.

Designating as the Vietnamese adaptation that technically included to the I Can See Your Voice franchise, the series made an introduction to the "battle format", which would be later implemented to existing ICSYV counterparts. (Note: Countries that used the "battle format" are: Fully in Indonesia and Thailand; Partially in Mexico; Modified as "invasion format" (in Russia with Catch Me If You Can; and Georgia with Imghere))

== Gameplay ==
=== Format ===
Over the course of three rounds, two opposing guest artists must attempt to eliminate bad singers from a group of seven "mystery singers", identified only by their occupation or alias, without ever hearing them perform live. They are assisted by clues regarding the singers' backgrounds, style of performance, and observations from a celebrity panel. At the end of a game, the last remaining mystery singers are revealed as either good or bad by means of a duet between them and one of the guest artists.

Under the "battle format", two opposing guest artists eliminate one singer each during the proper game phase, and then keep one singer each to join the final performance. The winner is determined by the remaining mystery singers, who are chosen by opposing guest artists, as per specific winning condition depends on the outcome of their final performance, if:

1. One opposing guest artist kept a good singer and the other had a bad singer, or
2. Both opposing guest artists kept good or bad singers.

The guest artists and winning mystery singers are rewarded on following conditions:

- If the last remaining mystery singer is good, the guest artist wins D50,000,000; in case of a tie, the same prize money is split, receiving D25,000,000 each. Both winning mystery singers, regardless of being good or bad, get D10,000,000 each.
- For the fifth season, the eliminated good singer gets a consolation prize of D2,000,000.

=== Rounds ===
==== Visual round ====
- s1–5: The guest artist is given some time to observe and examine each mystery singer based on their appearance. Afterward, a muted video of each mystery singer that reveals only 0.3 seconds of their singing voice is played as an additional hint.

==== Lip sync round ====
- s1–5: Each mystery singer performs a lip sync to a song; good singers mime to a recording of their own, while bad singers mime to a backing track by another vocalist.

==== Interrogation round ====
- s1, 3–5: The guest artist may ask questions to the remaining mystery singers. Good singers are required to give truthful responses, while the bad singers must lie.

==== Talent round ====
- s2: The guest artist must describe one of the mystery singer's other talents, except "singing" itself. This may not be related to the "stage of truth", but depends on their identity.

== Production ==
BNT News provisionally announced an Vietnamese adaptation of I Can See Your Voice at the time when (South Korean) second season of the same title premiered on 22 October 2015; this was initially confirmed by VTV in March 2016, with Cát Tiên Sa assigning on production duties. HTV would later reacquire the rights in July 2016, this time with Điền Quân Media, Color Entertainment and Pixel Factory co-producing the show.

== Broadcast history ==
Hidden Voices debuted on 5 November 2016, with filming taking place at the Pixel Factory Studios in Gò Vấp, Ho Chi Minh City.

In September 2017, HTV renewed the series for a second season, which premiered on 7 October 2017. In March 2018, a post from GAGA's official Facebook page announced the auditions for a then-upcoming third season, which was subsequently confirmed by HTV and began airing on 28 July 2018.

A trailer from Điền Quân Entertainment's YouTube channel in April 2019 also announced the auditions for a then-upcoming fourth season, which was subsequently confirmed by HTV and began airing on 27 July 2019; despite the linear television broadcasts ended on 2 November 2019, it would continue through streaming until the formal conclusion on 18 January 2020. (Note: The 4th season has originally scheduled to air for 15 episodes, with Phan Mạnh Quỳnh defeating Thùy Chi on its tentative [15th episode] finale on 2 November 2019; this was later added by 11 unaired episodes until the formal conclusion on 18 January 2020.) Trang Pháp defeated Hồ Việt Trung in a kids special on 4 January 2020.

According to a vlog by director Khương Dừa in March 2020, the fifth season was originally planned to suspend auditions and subsequently halt its production due to the COVID-19 pandemic, resulting in immediate cancellation; HTV formally decided to continue anyway and then premiered on 28 June 2020. Vũ Cát Tường defeated Tóc Tiên in a celebrity special on 26 July 2020.

== Cast ==
The series employs a panel of celebrity "detectives" who assist the guest artists in identifying good and bad mystery singers throughout the game. Along with regular members, guest panelists also appear since the third season. Overall, four celebrities have served as panelists, with their original lineup consisting of Ốc Thanh Vân, Thu Trang, Trấn Thành, and Trường Giang.

Designations:
H Hosting duties
g# Total games attended, by panelists

Cast member	Seasons				
Cast member	1	2	3	4	5
Đại Nghĩa	H	H	H	H	H
Ốc Thanh Vân	18	18			
Thu Trang	18	18			
Trấn Thành	18	18	15	26	15
Trường Giang	18	18	15	26	15

== Series overview ==
Series	Episodes	Originally released		Good singers	Bad singers
Series	Episodes	First released	Last released	Good singers	Bad singers
1	18	5 November 2016	4 March 2017	20	16
2	18	7 October 2017	3 February 2018	19	17
3	15	28 July 2018	11 November 2018	17	13
4	25	27 July 2019	18 January 2020	27	23
5	14	28 June 2020	4 October 2020	14	14
Sp	2	4 January 2020	26 July 2020	2	2
