= Lam Trường =

Vietnamese singer

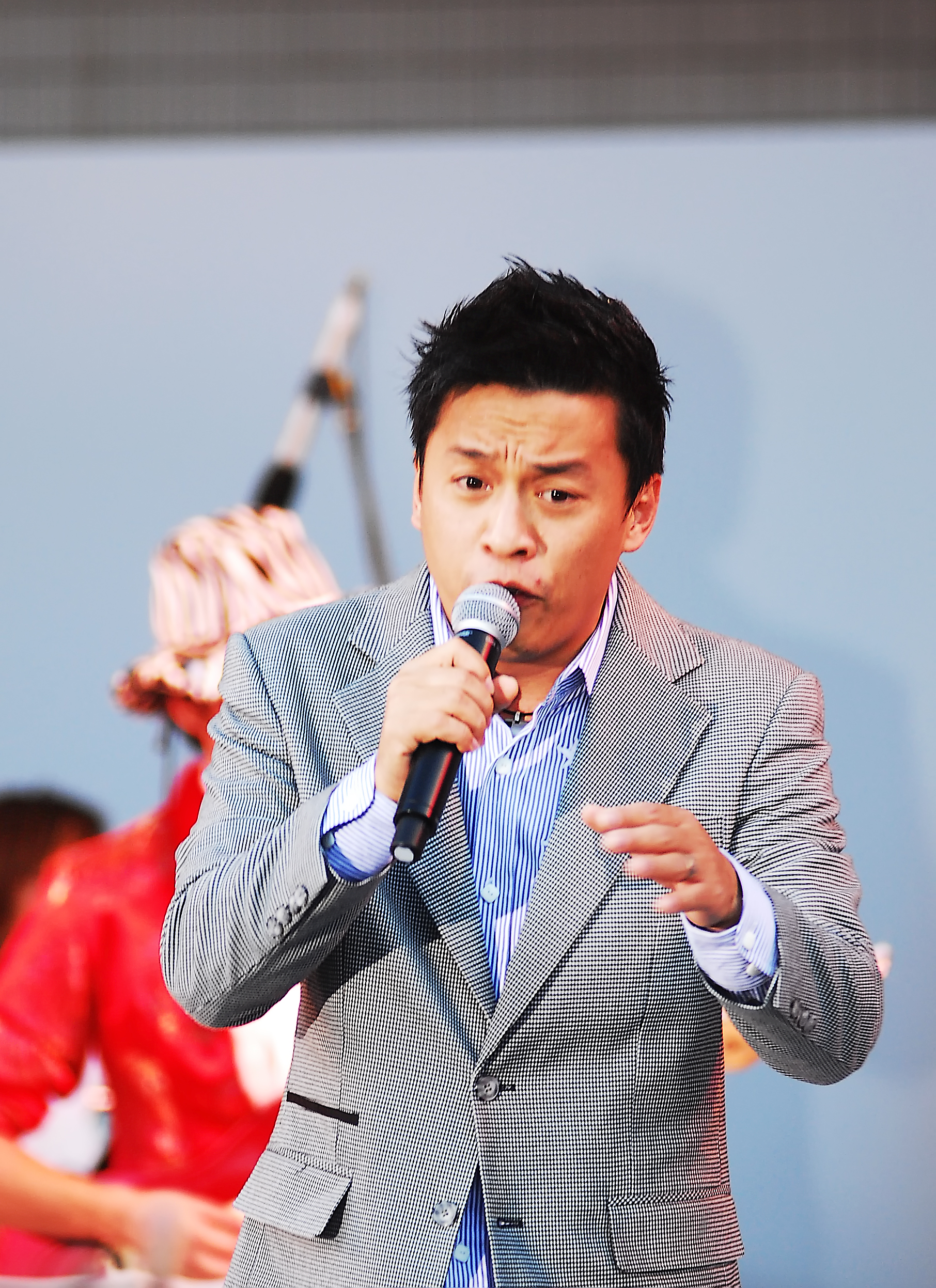
- Lam Trường performing at the Vietnam Festival 2008 at Japan

Background information
- Born: Tiêu Lam Trường; 14 October 1974 (age 51); Saigon, Vietnam
- Genres: Pop
- Occupation: Singer
- Years active: 1994–present

Tiêu Lam Trường (born 14 October 1974), is a Vietnamese singer, considered one of the top singers of Vietnam in the late 1990s. He burst onto the scene in 1998 with a song titled "Tình Thôi Xót Xa" (trans. Love Stops Hurting) and has been a regular on the Top Ten Làn Sóng Xanh (a Vietnamese hit song program). He has also been in several movies and TV series. He is also an actor in a series called "Ngôi Nhà Hạnh Phúc" (Vietnamese version of Korean drama "Full House").

== Career ==
His song "Tình Thôi Xót Xa" (written by Bảo Chấn) become one of his signature song which received most request at the radio and his live show performances at the time. Besides that, he also have other significant songs: Cho Bạn Cho Tôi, Katy, Đôi Chân Thiên Thần...

In 2007, Lam Trường represented for Vietnam to embark the 2007 Asia Song Festival held in South Korea, which also features F4, Super Junior, and Zhao Wei in that year.

He also serves as coach in The Voice Kids (Vietnamese version).

=== Music ===
October 1995, he was a runner-up of Thập Đại Tinh Tú singing contest for Vietnamese-Chinese community in Ho Chi Minh City.

In 1997, his debut album Baby I Love You was released, besides he also released many impressive cover songs from foreign songs. In 1998, he became a sensation with hit song Tình Thôi Xót Xa (composed by Bao Chan). Following Tôi Ngàn Năm Đợi, Mưa Phi Trường,...For such a long time, he kept being featured in Top 10 Green Wave Music Chart of Ho Chi Minh City's Television. In 2000, his first liveshow Lời Trái Tim Muốn Nói and album Chút Tình Ngây Thơ were successful. In 2002, he held second liveshow Cho Bạn Cho Tôi and released the single Cho Bạn Cho Tôi which was composed by himself after the first song Có Một Ngày back in 2001.

In September 2002, Japan's NHK channel invited him to perform in Japan after he'd won Green Wave Award. `In 2003, he continued to release albums Đêm Lạnh and Dù Ta Không Còn Yêu.

On 24 March 2007, Truong made another liveshow Chuyện Hôm Qua at Military Base 7 Stadium, Ho Chi Minh City. In 2007, Truong is Vietnam's representative for Asia Song Festival in Korea.

=== Film ===
In addition to singing, Lam Trường has also appeared in several films, such as Nữ tướng cướp (Gangster Lady, 2004), Ngôi nhà hạnh phúc (Full House, 2008) — the Vietnamese adaptation of the popular South Korean TV series of the same name — and Bếp Hát (The Kitchen Musical, 2014), based on the hit 2011 Asian television series The Kitchen Musical.

== Personal life ==
In 2004, he married Ngo Y An, a Vietnamese-American lived in Houston, Texas who is a computer engineer. They have one son named Tieu Kien Van. However, they divorced in 2009 and his son is currently living with his ex wife.

In 2013, he remarried Yen Phuong – a student of Green River College, Auburn, Washington, USA who is 17-year younger than he is. In 2014, they officially became husband and wife, apparently he is back and forth between USA and Vietnam. Their daughter was born in 2017 and named Tieu Yen Lam.

== Discography ==
=== Albums ===
- Baby, I Love You (1997)
- Tình Thôi Xót Xa (1998)
- Có Một Ngày (2001)
- Dù Ta Không Còn Yêu (2003)
- Đôi Giày Vải (2006)
- Chuyện Hôm Qua (2007)

=== Songs ===
- Tình Thôi Xót Xa
- Mưa Phi Trường
- Nơi Ấy Bình Yên
- Gót Hồng
- Dù Ta Không Còn Yêu
- Cho Bạn Cho Tôi
- Đôi Chân Thiên Thần
- Katy

== Filmography ==
- Nữ Tướng Cướp (Movie) (2004)
- Ngôi Nhà Hạnh Phúc (TV Mini-Series) (2009)
- Bếp Hát (TV Series) (2013)
- Hidden Voices (TV series) (2017)
