= Khổng Tú Quỳnh =

Vietnamese singer (born 1991)

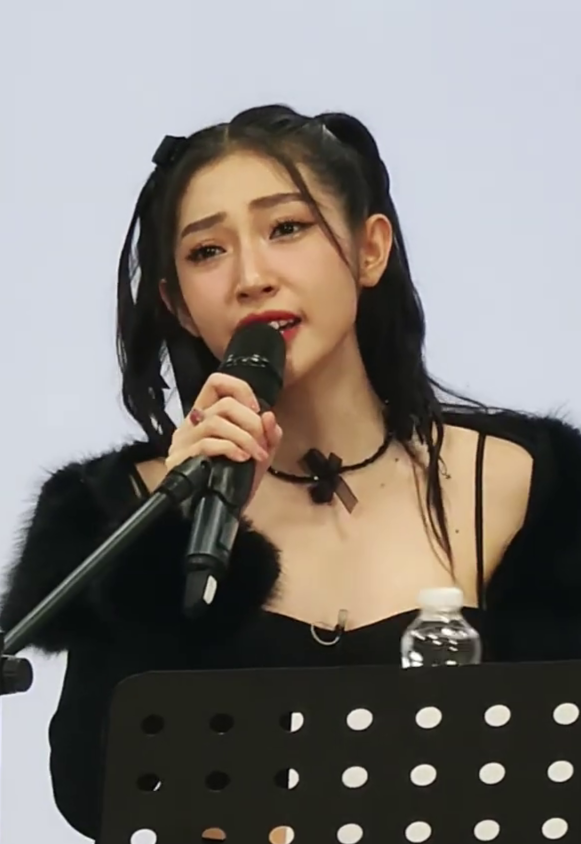
- Quỳnh in 2023

Background information
- Born: November 22, 1991 (age 34); Ho Chi Minh City, Vietnam
- Genres: Pop, dance
- Occupations: Singer, dancer, actress
- Instruments: Singing

Khổng Tú Quỳnh (born November 22, 1991) is a Vietnamese singer known for pop genre songs like "Tiệm Bánh Dâu Tây" (Strawberry Cake Shop) and "Lạnh" (Cold).
