= Nguyễn Trần Trung Quân =

Vietnamese singer and music producer

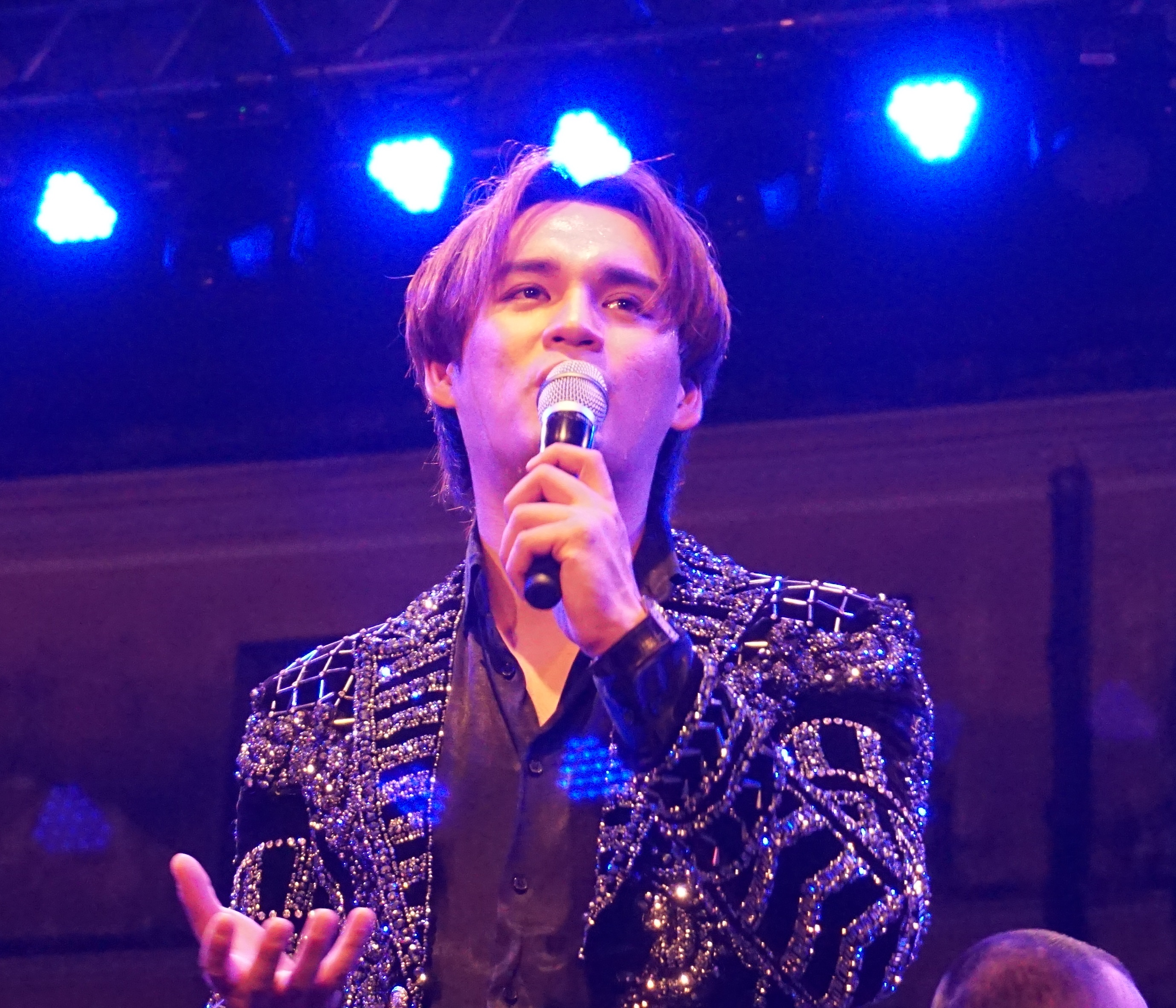
- Nguyễn Trần Trung Quân at Festival Huế in 2018

Background information
- Born: Nguyễn Trần Trung Quân; November 16, 1992 (age 33); Hanoi, Vietnam
- Genres: Pop; ballad; electropop; contemporary folk
- Occupations: Singer, composer, music producer, voice teacher
- Instrument: Piano
- Years active: 2007–now
- Website: Nguyễn Trần Trung Quân on Facebook

Nguyễn Trần Trung Quân (born November 16, 1992) is a Vietnamese singer, vocal teacher, and music producer. After studying at the Vietnam National Academy of Music, Trung Quân appeared twice on Sao Mai điểm hẹn (2011 and 2012). He released his first album, Khoi Hanh, in 2014 and subsequently won Album of the Year and New Artist of the Year at the 2015 Dedication Music Awards.

== Career ==
As a child, Trung Quân won awards in several singing competitions, including Most Impressive Face at the 2002 National Nightingale Solo; second place at the Northern Folk Song Festival in 2005; and first place in the Hanoi Youth Singing Festival in 2007. He finished in the Top 30 in the Hot Vteen Northern Vietnam contest in 2009 and with the title of Young Promising Singer at the Hanoi Band and Singing Festival in 2010. Also in 2010, he competed in a Facebook contest held by Vietnam Student Newspaper and FPT Arena Multimedia and won the Most Talented Student award.

In 2011, at age 17, Trung Quân appeared on Sao Mai điểm hẹn, a televised singing competition in Vietnam, where he won the Promising Young Singer award. He competed again in 2012, finishing in the top 4. In 2013, he was the only Vietnamese singer to be invited to appear onstage at an event with motivational speaker Nick Vujicic. In December, he represented Vietnam at the World Youth Festival in Ecuador with fellow singers Mai Trang and Thanh Huyen. He has been a vocal teacher since 2013. Min is one of his former students.

Trung Quân released his first album, Khoi Hanh (English: Departure) in 2014. It was produced by Khac Hung. He was selected as New Artist of the Year and Khoi Hanh was chosen as Album of the Year at the 2014 Dedication Music Awards. In 2015, Vietnam Japanese Goodwill Ambassador, Sugi Ryotaro, invited Trung Quân to participate in a music exchange program between the countries. There, he performed with singer Atsushi. Back in Vietnam, Trung Quân continued to collaborate with artist Khac Hung, including starting their own music production company, AD Production. The pair won the television competition Dream High: Start of the Dream in 2016. He released his third album, Nước Chảy Hoa Trôi (Reborn), in 2021.

While performing in Hai Phong in February 2024, Trung Quân was hospitalised due to stress-induced facial paralysis.

== Discography ==
=== Album ===
- Khoi Hanh (2014)
- Canh ba (2020)
- Nước Chảy Hoa Trôi (Reborn) (2021)

=== Single ===
- "Một người tôi luôn kiếm tìm" (2012)
- "Nơi ta bắt đầu" – with Huyen Sambi (2012)
- "Giáng sinh yên bình" (2013)
- "Gió mùa về" (2013)
- "Chạm" (2013)
- "Trôi" (2013)
- "Diva's cover" (2013)
- "Gọi anh" – with Bao Tram Idol (2013)
- "Nghiêng" (2014)
- "Ngày khát" (2015)
- "Mẹ yêu" – with Erik (2016)
- "Trong trí nhớ của anh" (2018)
- "Màu nước mắt" (2018)
- "Tự tâm" (2019)
- "Canh ba" (2020)
- "Nước chảy hoa trôi (Reborn)" (2021)
