= Han Sara =

South Korean singer and actress (born 2000)

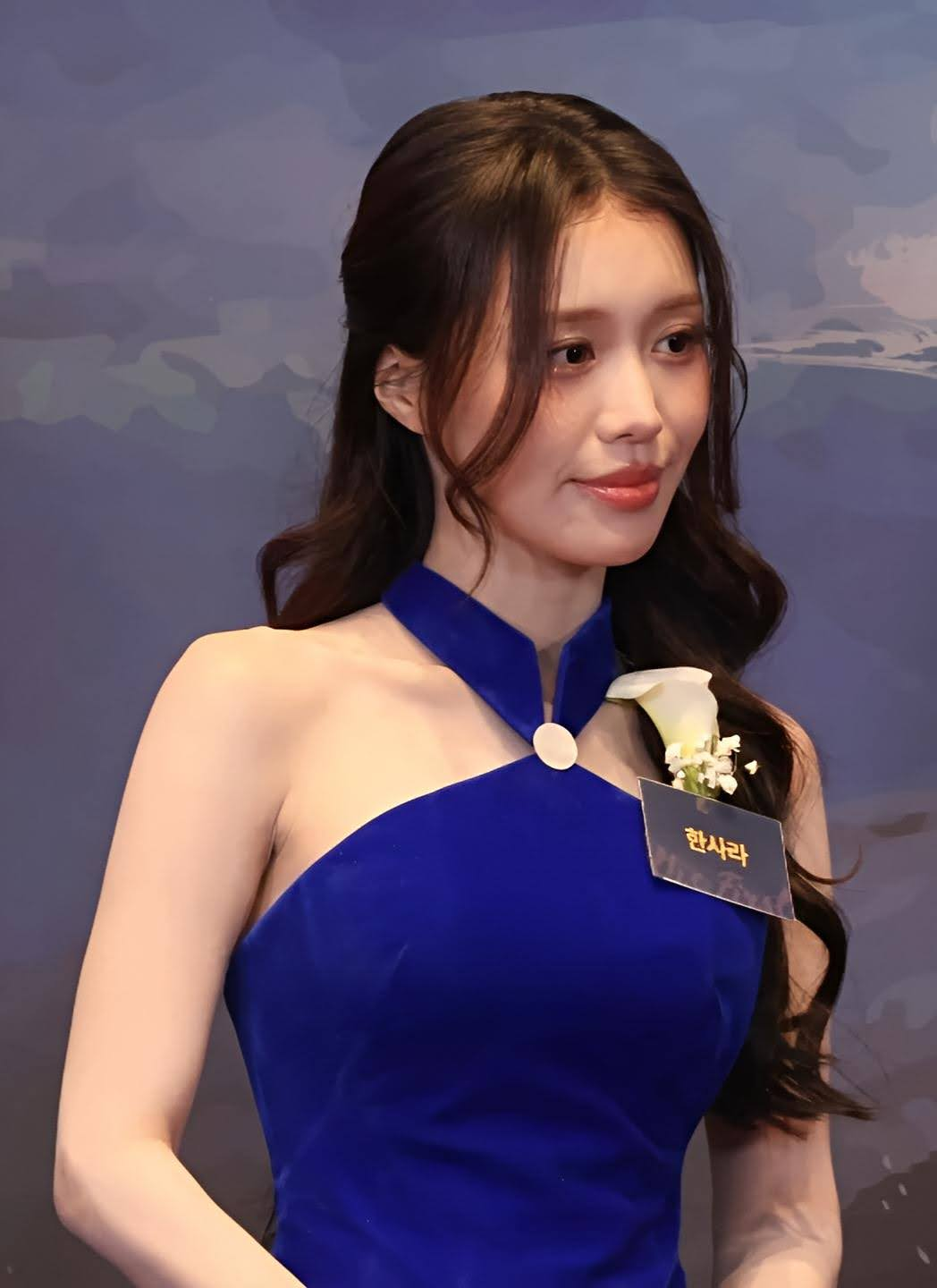
- Han Sara in 2026

Background information
- Born: November 17, 2000 (age 25); Seoul, South Korea
- Genres: V-pop; K-pop; Dance-pop; R&B
- Occupations: Singer; actress
- Instrument: Vocals
- Years active: 2017–present
- Label: 6th Sense Entertainment (2017–2022)

Korean name
- Hangul: 한사라
- RR: Han Sara
- MR: Han Sara

Han Sara (Korean: 한사라; born 17 November 2000) is a South Korean singer and actress active primarily in Vietnam. She first gained public attention after competing in the fourth season of the reality television singing competition The Voice of Vietnam (2017).

== Early life ==
Han Sara was born in Seoul, South Korea. At the age of 10, she moved to Ho Chi Minh City, Vietnam, with her father to live and study. Having lived in Vietnam from a young age, she is fluent in both Vietnamese and Korean.

== Career ==
=== 2017–2021: Debut and 6th Sense Entertainment ===
In 2017, Han Sara auditioned for the fourth season of The Voice of Vietnam and joined the team of coach Đông Nhi. As a Korean contestant singing fluent Vietnamese, she gained significant public interest.

Following the show, she signed an exclusive contract with 6th Sense Entertainment, an entertainment agency founded by Đông Nhi and Ông Cao Thắng. During her time with the agency, she released several successful singles, including "Tớ thích ấy", "Đếm cừu" (featuring Kay Trần), and "Vì yêu là nhớ" (original soundtrack for the film Scandal Maker). In addition to her music career, she also pursued acting in film and television productions.

In 2021, she participated in the music competition show The Heroes, where she finished as the runner-up.

In 2021, during her appearance on The Heroes, Han Sara performed a rearranged EDM version of "Cô gái mở đường", a revolutionary song originally composed by Xuân Giao. The performance sparked public controversy and criticism from experts, who argued that the modern arrangement and performance attire were disrespectful to the solemnity of the original work. Following the backlash, Han Sara and the production team issued a public apology, removed the performance video from media platforms, and committed to taking greater care when adapting traditional musical works.

=== 2022–present: Independent career and international activities ===
In May 2022, Han Sara announced her departure from 6th Sense Entertainment after five years to pursue an independent career. She subsequently took a hiatus of over two years to redefine her musical direction.

Between 2025 and 2026, she returned to active promotions, participating in high-level diplomatic and cultural exchange events connecting Vietnam and South Korea. In early 2026, she received an award at the Korea First Brand Awards held in South Korea.

== Awards and nominations ==
Year	Award	Category	Nominated work / Recipient	Result	Ref.
2021	The Heroes	Music Competition	Han Sara & Producer T-Master	Runner-up	
2025	Green Wave Awards	Favorite Female Singer/Rapper	Herself	Nominated	
2026	Korea First Brand Awards	Outstanding Artist (Vietnamese Culture/Entertainment)	Herself	Won	

== Discography ==
=== Selected singles ===
Year	Title	Featured artist	Notes
2017	"Tớ thích ấy"	—	Debut single
2018	"Vì yêu là nhớ"	—	Soundtrack for Ông ngoại tuổi 30
2018	"Mình cần nhau"	—	
2019	"Đếm cừu"	Kay Trần	
2020	"Yêu rồi đi"	—	
2021	"Xin đừng buông tay"	—	

== Filmography ==
- Siêu quậy có bầu (Feature film, 2019)
- Mùa hè 1999 (Feature film)

== See also ==
- The Voice of Vietnam
- V-pop
