= Thủy Tiên =

Vietnamese singer, model, actress (born 1985)

Trần Thị Thủy Tiên
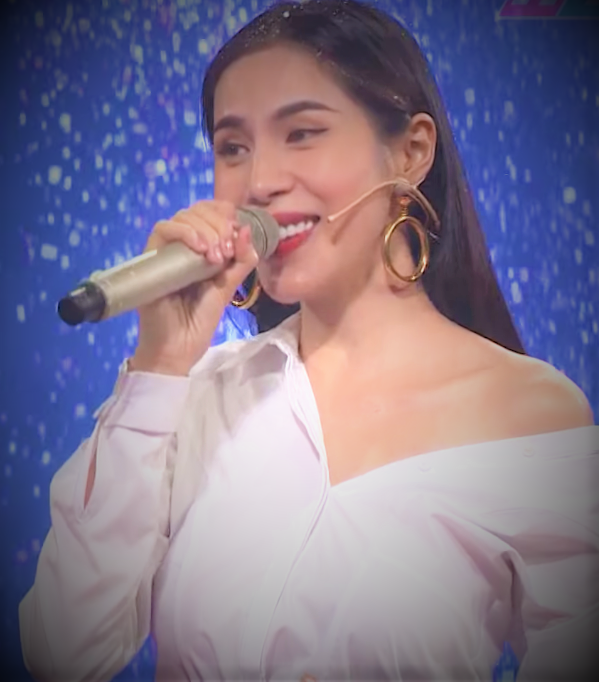
- Born: Trần Thị Thủy Tiên; 25 November 1985 (age 40); Kiên Giang, Vietnam
- Years active: 2005–
- Spouse: Lê Công Vinh (m. 2014)
- Children: 1
- Musical career
- Genres: Gothic rock; pop; dance-pop
- Occupations: Singer; actress; model

Trần Thị Thủy Tiên (born 25 November 1985) is a Vietnamese singer-songwriter, model, actress and philanthropist. Referred to as the “Queen of the Vietnamese Movie Soundtrack”, she is known for her soundtrack albums Giấc Mơ Tuyết Trắng, Đẹp Từng Centiment, and Ngôi Nhà Hạnh Phúc.

== Discography ==
- Ngọt và đắng (2005)
- Thủy Tiên (2006)
- Giấc mơ tuyết trắng (2007)
- Ngôi nhà hạnh phúc (2009)
- Em đã quên (2010)
- Vẫn mãi yêu anh (2012)
- Dẫu chỉ là mơ (2014)
- Đôi mắt người xưa - Bolero (2017)

== Filmography ==
=== Film ===
| Year | Title | Role | Notes |
|---|---|---|---|
| 2008 | Nụ hôn thần chết | Juliet | |
| 2009 | Đẹp từng centimet | | Guest |
| 2010 | Burning Kisses (Những nụ hôn rực rỡ) | | Guest |
| 2016 | Vợ ơi... Em ở đâu thế? | Nguyệt Nga | |

=== Television ===
| Year | Title | Role | Notes |
|---|---|---|---|
| 2008 | Bỗng dưng muốn khóc | Hoàng Yến | |
| 2009 | Ngôi nhà hạnh phúc | Bảo Yến | remake from Korean TV series Full House |
| 2018 | Sóng tình | Hồng Ngọc | |
