= Bảo Thy =

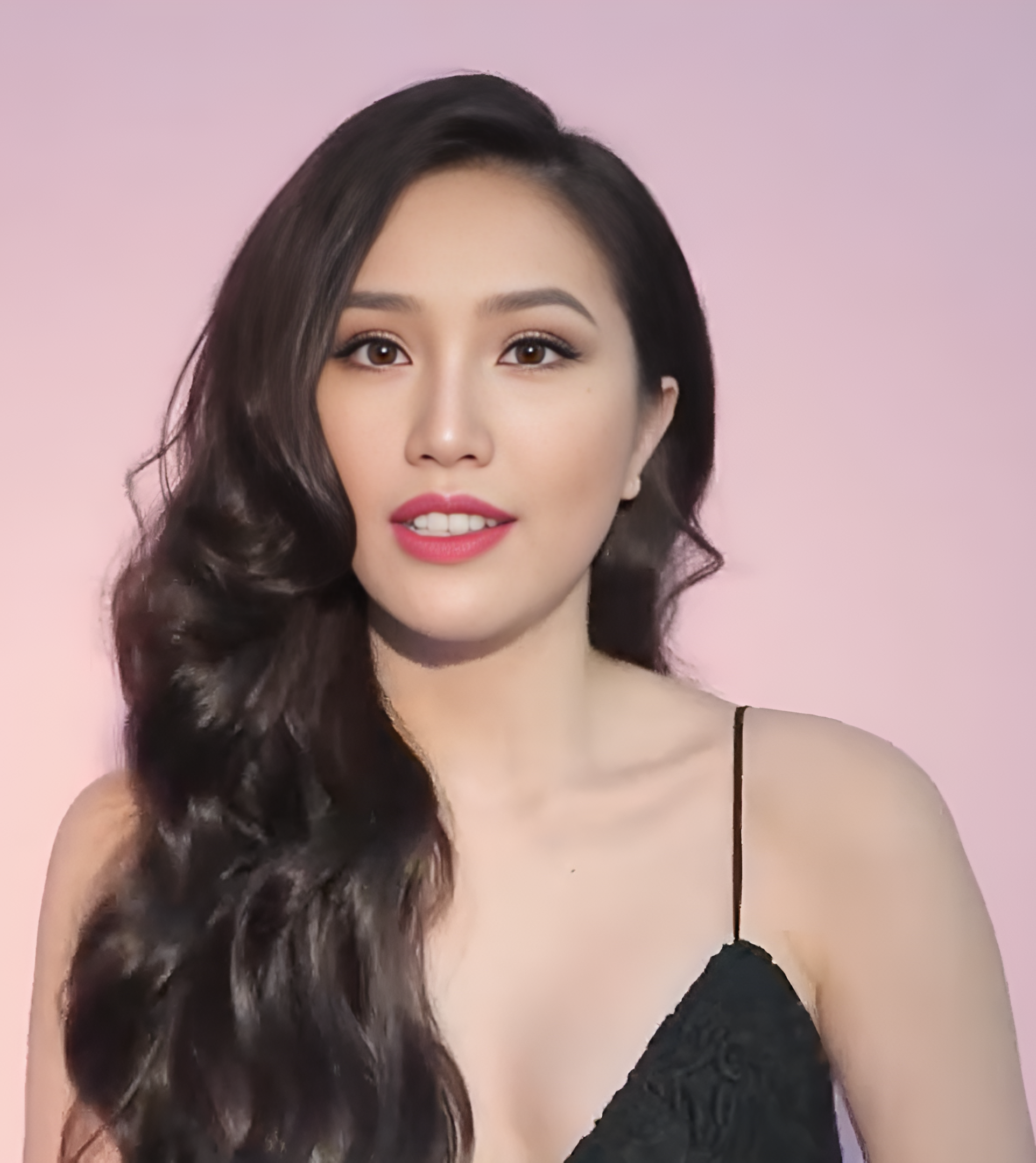
- Bảo Thy in 2017

Background information
- Born: Trần Thị Thúy Loan; 2 June 1988 (age 38); Ho Chi Minh City, Vietnam
- Origin: Ho Chi Minh City, Vietnam
- Genre: Pop
- Occupations: Singer; actress
- Instruments: Vocals

Trần Thị Thúy Loan, stage name Bảo Thy (2 June 1988) is a Vietnamese singer and actress.

She reached to fame for making to Top 10 Most Beautiful Contestants according to the vote of game online Võ Lâm Truyền Kỳ in 2006 and also the most impressive contestant in gala night Miss Audition 2007.

In 2010, she took the lead role in the comedy film vi:Công Chúa Teen Và Ngũ Hổ Tướng ("The Teen Princess and the 5 Brave Generals"). In June 2012, she was the subject of controversy in the South Korean press when the Chosun Ilbo (Korea Daily) accused her video director of plagiarizing a dance scene in front of an SUV from a video by Kim Hyun-a. Her debut hit song "Bubble Princess" (In Vietnamese: "Công Chúa Bong Bóng") was made popular in 2007 by its association with the game Audition Online.

== Biography ==
=== 2006–2007: Online fame ===
In 2006, she participated in a contest of voting the face of online game Võ Lâm Truyền Kỳ on the website of Vinagame; eventually, she made to the top 10 of contestants that owned the highest votes and won the title "Thập Đại Mỹ Nhân Võ Lâm Truyền Kỳ" afterward. After this contest, she and Hai Yen (two of those that had the highest votes) were invited by the director Quang Dung to be starred in the movie Võ Lâm Truyền Kỳ by Phước Sang Films. However, she didn't make it to the movie.

Middle of 2006, she competed in Miss Audition contest which was a beauty pageant for the players of online game Audition. Afterward, she made it to the top 10 of most beautiful contestant. In the final night in Ha Noi, she and singer Vương Khang together performed 2 theme songs of the game which was written into Vietnamese lyric by herself: "10 minutes" and "Please tell me why", this duet constantly topped on many music charts in Vietnam. Thank to the success of this contest, she quit her oversea studying plan in the US to pursue profession singing.

At the end of 2007, she was invited to join Hành Trình Âm Nhạc (Journey of Music) as a host. This was a reality show remade from Korea. Shortly after, she took over the host position for many game shows like Nào Ta Cùng Hát (Let's Sing Together), Hành Trình Kết Nối Những Trái Tim, (Journey of Connecting Hearts), Album Vàng (Golden Album)...However, many opinions was raised later that she was not suitable to be a TV host due to her thin voice and lack of emotion face during the hosting.

Later, she released a series of new songs like Sorry, Vẫn Ngỡ Như Là, Xin Đừng Xát Muối Trái Tim Em, Công Chúa Bong Bóng,...alongside the attendance of many big music shows like Âm Nhạc Của Tôi (My Music), Giai Điệu Tình Yêu Coolshow, Sfone Event, Cyworld Event and many different TV shows helped her gain more recognition, especially the young audience.

=== 2008: Ngôi Nhà Hoa Hồng and Có Bao Giờ ... Em Sai ===
Beside, her first collaboration with singer Quang Vinh received positive reviews, as the popular of the duet song "Ngoi Nha Hoa Hong". On 14 February 2008, both released a duet CD Ngoi Nha Hoa Hong included 7 songs which consisted of 3 duet songs and 4 single songs by each of them. The album has been re-released for 4 times and all of the songs of the album were charted on local music charts.

She has also collaborated with brands such as Asus, Samsung and Rexona.

On 2 June 2008, as a celebration for 20th birthday, she had a show title Balloon Party, with the attendance of more than 400 audiences which the majority of it was young audience, as well as some guest artists: Quang Vinh, Vuong Khang, 2B boygroup.

On 8 August 2008, she released her first album Co Bao Gio ... Em Sai, that including 8 songs (5 Vietnamese songs and 3 foreign songs with Vietnamese lyrics written by Bao Thy herself and songwriter Thien An). The album was nationally released by Saigon Media. During the making process of the album, she was invited to star in the movie Nu Sinh Quy Toc by director Le Hoang and Thien Ngan Films. However, the movie was cancelled.

=== 2009–2011: Công Chúa Teen và Ngũ Hổ Tướng, Ký Ức Của Mưa and Special Album ===
In April 2009, she released new song Thien Than Trong Truyen Tranh (Lenka's The Show) as theme song for charity campaign for students of special school Gia Dinh, Ho Chi Minh City. Also, handmade products by handicapped students of Gia Dinh School was auctioned by Bao Thy herself during her shows. During this time, she planned to release a mini-CD The Collection of Bao Thy included foreign songs (Chinese, North Korean and English) and Vietnamese lyrics were written by herself, Vuong Khang and Tu Trung. However, until the end of June, the plan was cancelled as she decided focus on more Vietnamese songs instead.

In 2009, she starred as Britney Bich in the movie Cong Chua Teen va Ngu Ho Tuong by Phuoc Sang Film with 6 billion Vietnam Dong budget. This role helped her win Potential Actress at Golden Kite Award 2009.

In July 2010, she released album Vol. 2 Ky Uc Cua Mua including nine tracks and three bonus tracks written by Si Luan, Bao Thach, she composed two of them. The album contained many hits, fuelling her further success, one of them was Golden Album award for Favorite Album of The Month voted by the audience (August 2010), and 3 Zing Music Awards. In December, she released the first single titled First Single, consisting three tracks of two different genres: Da Nghi with upbeat music alongside Gat Di Nuoc Mat and Tro Lai (ft. Quang Vinh) which was a ballad love song composed by herself.

In November 2011, she officially released the album Special Album as this was a complete album with seven new songs and three others previously released online. Three were covers: Vi Mot Nguoi (singer Ung Dai Ve), Khong Nhu Loi Anh Noi (singer Nguyen Quang Hung – LK) and Noi Do (singer Kien Tran) alongside a foreign song Everytime I Look Into Your Eyes. However, the music video of the head single Ngay Vang Anh was allegedly assumed that she copied the idea of another music video of Korean singer Hyuna. Although the music video of Ngay Vang Anh was told to be a copy of HyunA's Bubble Pop, she claimed that the song was completely her creation regardless. When the news was aired, many were curious so they watched the music video which made the view up to 400,000 until middle of October. However, at the same time, HyunA's Bubble Pop had already reached more than 36 million of views, which was 90 times. Allkpop said: "Bubble Pop has proven its international popularity when a Vietnamese singer copied it".

=== 2012-: Gia Su Nu Quai, loat dia don thanh cong and The Remix New Generation ===
In 2012, 2 years after Cong Chua Teen va Ngu Ho Tuong, she continued to experience acting in the movie Gia Su Nu Quai as character Huynh Mai, a daughter of a gangster of Saigon. Regarding music, from 2012 to 2013, she only released a few singles as she later shared that she had face some unfortunate incidents, to sing is just a pay back for her fans.

In 2014, she marked her comeback with the liveshow Toi Toa Sang So 2, collaborated with Cao Thai Son and the music video Single Lady was released at the end of that year.

In January 2015, the song Cang Kho Cang Yeu – a foreign song as a soundtrack of TVB drama "Su Do Hanh Gia" was performed by her and later received much attention from the Chinese press when TVB male actor Tham Chan Hien and the singer Ngo Nhuoc Hy (the original singer of the song) complimented her version. At the end of 2015, she released music video Im Sorry Babe as a chill-pop song for her comeback which also received positive review from the audience. Beside, she also won Impressive Comeback award of YAN VPOP 20. Early 2016, she continued to release a single Con Tim Anh Nam O Dau which topped many top music charts in Vietnam. In middle of that year, she also released two successful ballads she herself had written: Lonely and Quay Lung Di.

Early 2017, she participated in The Remix (season 3). After competing for four months, she was the third season's champion.

== Personal life ==
On Nov 12, 2019, she married Nguyen Phan Linh.

== Controversy ==
=== Plastic surgery allegation ===
The scandal started when a photo of hers was posted by a blogger on Yahoo! 360 blog. Many were concerned that she had gone under the knife. However she claimed that she had never gone under the knife as she was being too young to do that. Regarding the photo, it was a sticker as she was having a brace and she made a joke of it. Awhile later, this blogger's identity was discovered and he was required to clarify the previous information.

=== Copyright of songs ===
In 2008, there were rumors that foreign songs with Vietnamese lyrics she performed, such as 10 Minutes, Please tell me why, Sorry, and Van Ngo Nhu La, violated copyrights. There was even a song with lyrics telling her to stop plagiarising. However, concerning this, she said that she wasn't the one who contacted the songwriters of any song but Vuong Khang, and confirmed that all of those songs were legally purchased already and she was willing to display the contract. However, some said that she used too many foreign songs which could affect her career. Later, she postponed the release of a mini-CD as a collection of foreign songs – Vietnamese lyrics and stated she would focus on Vietnamese songs.

On 4 October 2009 in Hanoi, during a press before the official show of Hennessy. Singer Lenka who owned the song The Show mentioned that Bao Thy had used her song without permission. In another interview, she said: "I like the idea of new lyrics for any song, but I had no idea what she'd done to my song. If she used it as a mean of profit then it's not ok".

Facing these allegations, Bao Thy shared that Ben Thanh Audio which was responsible for the release of the song had already registered allowance from Bureau of Culture, Sport and Tourism of Ho Chi Minh City, as well as paid the legal copyright fee through Vietnam's Copyright Protection Center, However, following the statement of the direction, according to these procedures, she was only allowed to use the tracks of the album The Collection of Bao Thy and she needed to ask for permission to live perform. However, she used all of the tracks to perform in the liveshow Night of 9 May Trang girlgroup, iMusic Top Hits show of iTV and the final night of Ngoi Sao Tuoi Teen Viet 2009.

== Albums ==
- vi:Có bao giờ... em sai (2008)
- vi:Kí ức của mưa (2010)
- Special Album (2011)
- The First Single
