= Dương Triệu Vũ =

Vietnamese singer (born 1984)

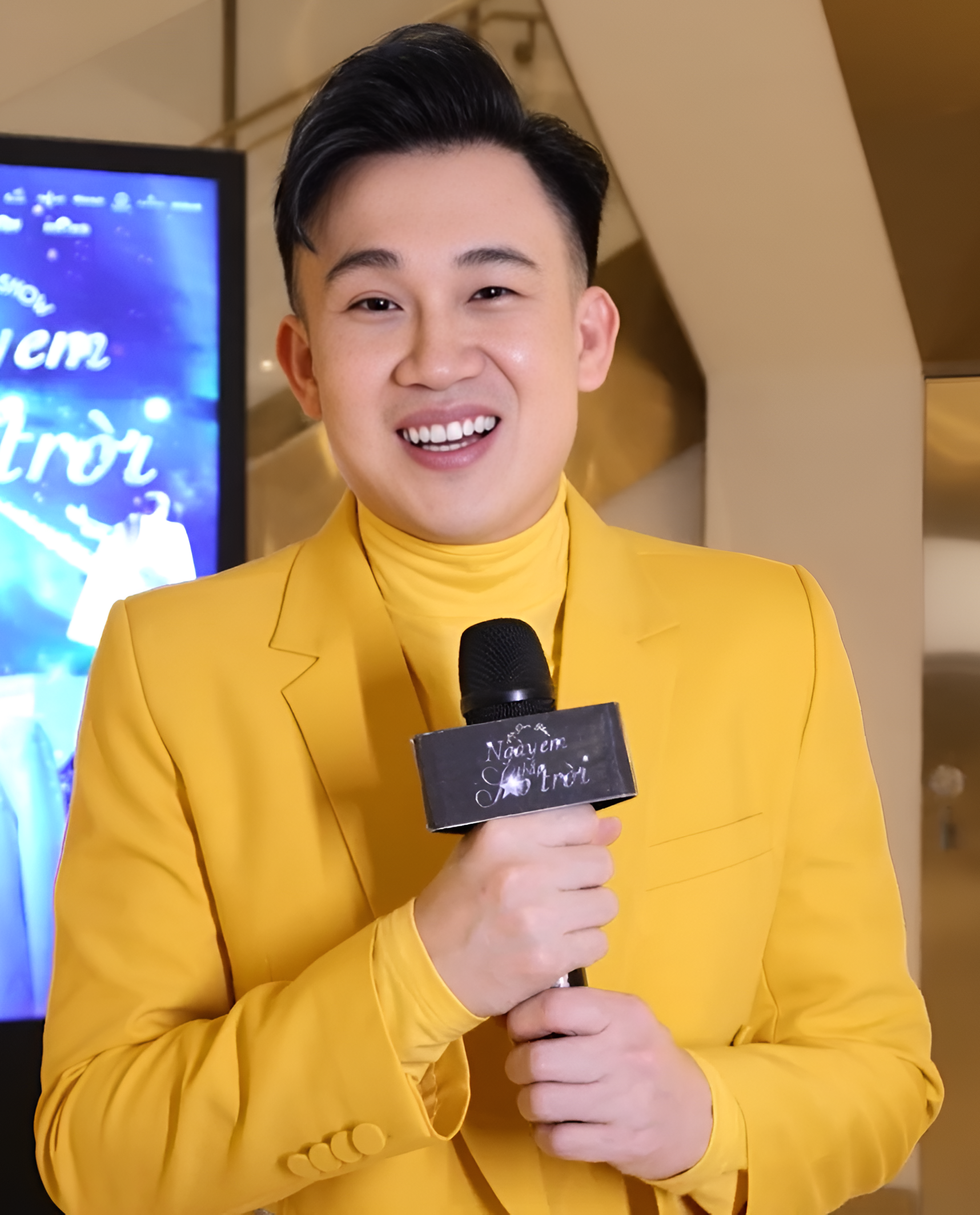
- Dương Triệu Vũ in 2024

Background information
- Born: Võ Nguyễn Tuấn Linh; January 1, 1984 (age 42); Cam Ranh, Khánh Hòa, Vietnam
- Occupation: Singer
- Instrument: Singing
- Label: Thúy Nga Production

Dương Triệu Vũ (born January 1, 1984, in Cam Ranh, Vietnam) is the stage name of Tuấn Linh, a singer on the popular Vietnamese diaspora music show Paris by Night.

== Biography ==
Born into a family of six children as the youngest, Tuấn Linh showed an early interest in reading and music, especially an ability to remember lyrics and music of songs. His parents were originally from Quảng Nam Province in central Vietnam, but due to economic difficulties, moved to Đồng Nai and then to the South Central Coast city of Cam Ranh, where his mother ran a maternity hospital Phương Trâm.

In 1993, his entire family immigrated to the United States when he was just nine years old, forcing each family member to face the difficulties of living in an unfamiliar country with an unfamiliar language. He was a shy boy, preferring to read rather than socialise. Although Orlando, Florida, did not have a large Vietnamese community, the Tết and Tết Trung Thu festivals allowed him to compete in singing competitions. At the 1994 Tết Trung Thu, he won the competition, and completed a hat-trick of victories in the following years. After that he became a soloist, singing at his local church.

When he was 13 years old, he participated in the video recording Van Son 9 with the song "Killing Me Softly with His Song". While in high school, he regularly participated in school musical productions, and in year 11, he became the first Asian student at his high school to become the Vice President of the student body. He received various awards, including the United States Achievement Academy, American Legion Award, and was one of 70 students at the school to take the International Baccalaureate. During this time, he also performed with Fantasy, a popular band in Orlando.

In 2004 he sent a demo CD with his singing to the Thúy Nga headquarters, and one week later received a phone call from the director and an invitation to come to California for a vocal test, as they were concerned that compared to the very young appearance in the photograph, the voice was very mature. The result was the announcement that he would make his debut on the stage of Thúy Nga (in Paris By Night). Only a few minutes before this, he announced that he had selected the stage name Dương Triệu Vũ. He has since become a regular cast member.

In January 2006 he released his debut solo album titled Ngày Đó Có Em (You Were There That Day).

== In Paris By Night ==
- Cho Người Tình Lỡ (Hoàng Nguyên) – PBN 73 – Song Ca Đặc Biệt – The Best of Duets (2004)
- Đoạn Buồn Cho Tôi (Tú Nhi) – PBN 75 – Về Miền Viễn Đông (2004)
- Chúc Xuân (ft Vân Quỳnh) – PBN 76 – Xuân Tha Hương (2005)
- Viễn Khúc Việt Nam (Tấn Phát) – PBN 77 – 30 Năm Viễn Xứ (2005)
- Biết Đến Thuở Nào (Tùng Giang) – PBN 78 – Đường Xưa (2005)
- Trọn Kiếp Bình Yên (Đăng Anh) ft Minh Tuyết – PBN 79 – Dreams (2005)
- Khiêu Vũ Bên Nhau (Laissez-moi Danser) (Vietnamese lyrics: Vũ Xuân Hùng) ft Lương Tùng Quang, Tommy Ngô, Minh Tuyết, Tâm Đoan, Bảo Hân, Tú Quyên, Hồ Lệ Thu & Lynda Trang Đài – PBN 79 – Dreams (2005)
- Dáng Xuân (Minh Châu) – PBN 80 – Tết Khắp Mọi Nhà (2006)
- Khúc Ca Mùa Đông (Vietnamese lyrics: Hoàng Tuấn Nghĩa) – PBN 81 – Âm Nhạc Không Biên Giới 2 (2006)
- Dĩ Vãng Êm Đềm (Tường Văn) ft Vân Quỳnh – PBN 82 – Tiểu Vương Hội (2006)
- Những Ngày Nắng Đẹp (Seasons In The Sun) (Vietnamese lyrics: Phạm Duy) ft Tùng Quang, Adam Hồ, Vân Quỳnh, Angela Trâm Anh & Hollie Thanh Ngọc – PBN 82 – Tiểu Vương Hội (2006)
- Mùa Hoa Anh Đào (Thanh Sơn) – PBN 83 – Nhưng Khúc Hát Ân Tình (2006)
- Lại Gần Hôn Em (ft Ngọc Liên) – PBN 84 – In Atlanta – Passport to Music & Fashion (Âm nhạc và Thời trang) (2006)
- Đoàn Người Lữ Thứ (Lam Phương) ft Thế Sơn, Trần Thái Hòa, Lương Tùng Quang, Trịnh Lam, Huy Tâm, Tâm Đoan, Hương Thủy, Ngọc Liên, Ngọc Loan, Quỳnh Vi, Hương Giang – PBN 88 – Lam Phương – Đường Về Quê Hương (2007)
- Say, Lầm (Lam Phương) ft Trịnh Lam – PBN 88 – Lam Phương – Đường Về Quê Hương (2007)
- Thiên Đàng Đánh Mất – PBN 89 – Tại Hàn Quốc (In Korea) (2007)
- Bốn Mắt Anh Yêu & Cô Bắc Kỳ Nho Nhỏ ft Lương Tùng Quang – PBN 90 – Chân Dung Người Phụ Nữ Việt Nam (2007)
- Trích Đoạn: "Trường ca Con Đường Cái Quan: Từ Miền Bắc" (Phạm Duy) ft Quỳnh Vi, Thế Sơn, Bằng Kiều, Quang Lê, Trần Thái Hòa, Trịnh Lam – PBN 91 – Huế, Sài Gòn, Hà Nội (2008)
- Trích Đoạn: "Con Đường Cái Quan: Qua Miền Trung" (Phạm Duy) ft Mai Thiên Vân, Trần Thái Hòa, Trịnh Lam, Lưu Việt Hùng & Nguyễn Hoàng Nam – PBN 91 – Huế, Sài Gòn, Hà Nội (2008)
- Bước Chân Chiều Chủ Nhật (Đỗ Kim Bảng) & Đêm Lang Thang (Vinh Sử) ft Ngọc Liên – PBN 91 – Huế, Sài Gòn, Hà Nội (2008)
- Liên Khúc Câu Chuyện Tình Tôi & Nửa Vầng Trăng ft Bảo Hân – PBN 92 – Nhạc Yêu Cầu (2008)
- Liên Khúc Top Hits ft Minh Tuyết, Quỳnh Vi, Tú Quyên, Ngọc Liên, Nguyệt Ánh, Bằng Kiều, Trịnh Lam, Lương Tùng Quang, Nguyễn Thắng – PBN 92 – Nhạc Yêu Cầu (2008)
- Em ở đâu (Chí Tài) – PBN 93 – Celebrity Dancing – Khiêu Vũ Của Các Ngôi Sao (2008)
- Vũ Khúc Paris Và Hãy Cho Tôi Ngày Mai ft Quỳnh Vi, Như Loan, Trịnh Lam, Lương Tùng Quang, Minh Tuyết, Bảo Hân, Hồ Lệ Thu & Celina Linh Thy – PBN 94 – 25th Anniversary (2008)
- Nếu chỉ còn một ngày để sống ft Khánh Ly, Khánh Hà, Bằng Kiều, Thế Sơn, Don Hồ, Trần Thái Hòa, Minh Tuyết, Quang Lê, Mai Thiên Vân, Hương Thủy, Hồ Lệ Thu, Trúc Lâm, Trúc Linh, Tú Quyên, Quỳnh Vi, Ngọc Liên, Lương Tùng Quang, Lưu Việt Hùng, Nguyệt Ánh, Hương Giang – PBN 95 – 25th Anniversary – Cám ơn Cuộc đời (2009)
- Đừng lừa dối (Minh Kỳ) – PBN 95 – 25th Anniversary – Cám ơn Cuộc đời (2009)
- Nhạc Kịch: Đi Tìm Nửa Vầng Trăng : Tiễn Anh Về Với Người (Tùng Châu & Thái Thịnh) & Tình Là Gì? (Thái Thịnh) ft Bảo Hân – PBN 96 – Nhạc Yêu Cầu 2 (2009)
- Rumba: You're My Heart, You're My Soul (Vietnamese lyrics: Võ Hoài Phúc) ft Alla Novikova – PBN 97 – Celebrity Dancing – Khiêu Vũ Của Các Ngôi Sao 2 (2009)
- Liên khúc Send me an angel & So sad (Vietnamese lyrics: Chiêu Nghi) ft Lam Anh PBN 98 – Fly With Us to Las Vegas (2009)
- Kỷ Niệm (Phạm Duy) – PBN 99 – Tôi Là Người Việt Nam (2010)
- Em Lụa Là (Lưu Thiên Hương) ft Hương Giang – PBN 109 – 30th Anniversary Celebration (2013)
- Muốn Nghe Từ Em Nói (Võ Hoài Phúc) – PBN 123 – Ảo Ảnh (2017)
- Liên khúc Giết Người Trong Mộng (Phạm Duy), Mười Năm Tình Cũ (Trần Quảng Nam), Vết Thù Trên Lưng Ngựa Hoang (Phạm Duy, Ngọc Chánh) – PBN Divos (2018)
- Liên khúc Em Hiền Như Ma Soeur, Thà Như Giọt Mưa, Hai Năm Tình Lận Đận (Phạm Duy, Nguyễn Tất Nhiên) – PBN 124 – Anh Cho Em Mùa Xuân (2018) ft. Don Hồ
- Tình Yêu Xây Đắp Nhân Gian (Hamlet Trương) – PBN 126 – Hành Trình 35 Năm (2018) ft. Don Hồ, Bằng Kiều, Trần Thái Hòa, Lương Tùng Quang, Lam Anh, Ngọc Anh, Minh Tuyết, Như Loan, Nguyễn Hồng Nhung
- Touch (Phúc Trường) ft. Lam Anh – PBN 126 – Hành Trình 35 Năm (2018)
- Liên khúc Một Thời Đã Xa (Trường Huy, Nguyễn Thanh Hà), 999 Đoá Hồng, Tình Nhạt Phai (LV: Tùng Giang), Trọn Kiếp Bình Yên (Đăng Anh) ft Minh Tuyết – PBN 128 VIP Party (2018)
- Feel The Lights (Võ Hoài Phúc) ft. Như Ý – PBN 128 – Hành Trình 35 Năm – Phần 3: Feel The Lights (2019)
- Quy Nhơn Mênh Mang Niềm Nhớ (Ngô Tín, Xuân Thi) – PBN 134 in Bangkok – Nguyễn Ngọc Ngạn: Lời Cám Ơn (2023)

== Album Đã Phát Hành ==
=== Thiên Đàng Đánh Mất (2007) ===
Song List:

- Lại Một Lần Nữa – Dương Triệu Vũ
- Đợi Em Trong Mơ – Dương Triệu Vũ
- Thương Nhau Ngày Mưa – Dương Triệu Vũ
- Ngày Xưa Em Hỡi – Dương Triệu Vũ
- Goodbye My Love (Tạm Biệt Tình Yêu) – Dương Triệu Vũ
- Cỏ Úa – Dương Triệu Vũ
- Con Đường Không Có Tên Anh – Dương Triệu Vũ
- Từ Đây Thôi Nhé – Dương Triệu Vũ
- Thiên Đàng Đánh Mất – Dương Triệu Vũ
- Năm Tình Cũ – Dương Triệu Vũ
- Một Lần Được Yêu – Dương Triệu Vũ

=== Em Ở Đâu (2009) ===
Song List:

- Trái Tim Chờ Em – Dương Triệu Vũ
- Dù Anh Vẫn Biết – Dương Triệu Vũ
- Kiếp Đam Mê – Dương Triệu Vũ
- Đời Vẫn Lang Thang – Dương Triệu Vũ – Hồng Ngọc
- Xa Em Kỷ Niệm – Dương Triệu Vũ
- Đừng Lừa Dối – Dương Triệu Vũ
- Sao Người Nỡ Quên – Dương Triệu Vũ
- Đêm Hoang Vắng – Dương Triệu Vũ
- Trái Tim Sầu – Dương Triệu Vũ
- Em Ở Đâu – Dương Triệu Vũ
- Liên Khúc Câu Chuyện Tình Tôi & Nửa Vầng Trăng – Dương Triệu Vũ – Bảo Hân

=== Mãi Mãi Bên Em ===
- Rất Muốn – Dương Triệu Vũ
- Mãi Mãi Bên Em – Dương Triệu Vũ
- Xa Em Kỷ Niệm – Dương Triệu Vũ
- Trái Tim Chờ Em – Dương Triệu Vũ
- Tạm Biệt Tình Yêu – Dương Triệu Vũ
- Đừng Lừa Dối – Dương Triệu Vũ ft. Lam Trường
- Anh Vẫn Thứ Tha – Dương Triệu Vũ
- Sao Ơi Tình Ơi – Dương Triệu Vũ
- Người Là Ai Ở Đâu – Dương Triệu Vũ
- Như Chưa Hề Chia Tay – Dương Triệu Vũ
- Sad Without You – Dương Triệu Vũ
- Túp Lều Lý Tưởng – Dương Triệu Vũ ft. Hồng Ngọc

=== Siêu Nhân (2011) ===
Song list:

- Siêu Nhân – Dương Triệu Vũ
- Biến Đổi – Dương Triệu Vũ
- Em Có Hay – Dương Triệu Vũ
- Anh Không Cần – Dương Triệu Vũ
- Sớm Muộn Gì Cũng Sẽ Phôi Pha – Dương Triệu Vũ
- Người Về Từ Lòng Đất – Dương Triệu Vũ
- Hận Tình Trong Mưa – Dương Triệu Vũ
- Đừng Tìm Lại – Dương Triệu Vũ

=== The Best of Dương Triệu Vũ (2011) ===
Song List:

- Căn Phòng – Dương Triệu Vũ ft. Lệ Quyên
- Thiên Đường Đánh Mất – Dương Triệu Vũ
- Tỉnh Mộng – Dương Triệu Vũ
- Lại Một Lần Nữa – Dương Triệu Vũ
- Từ Đây Thôi Nhé – Dương Triệu Vũ
- Nhớ Rất Nhớ – Dương Triệu Vũ ft. Bảo Thy
- Lời Yêu Thương – Dương Triệu Vũ
- Trọn Kiếp Bình Yên – Dương Triệu Vũ ft. Minh Tuyết
- Anh Vẫn Thứ Tha – Dương Triệu Vũ
- Dù Anh Vẫn Biết – Dương Triệu Vũ
- Anh Không Cần – Dương Triệu Vũ
- Em Ở Đâu – Dương Triệu Vũ
- Mãi Mãi Bên Em – Dương Triệu Vũ
- Sao Ơi, Tình Ơi – Dương Triệu Vũ
- Trái Tim Chờ Em – Dương Triệu Vũ
- Đợi Em Trong Mơ – Dương Triệu Vũ
- Siêu Nhân – Dương Triệu Vũ
- Bản Tình Ca Mùa Đông – Dương Triệu Vũ

=== Căn Phòng – Single (2011) ===
Song List:

- Căn Phòng (Acoustic) – Dương Triệu Vũ
- Căn Phòng – Dương Triệu Vũ
- Căn Phòng (DJ Wang Remix) – Dương Triệu Vũ
- Căn Phòng (Phúc Bồ Remix) – Dương Triệu Vũ

Duong Trieu Vu

== Awards ==
- Ca sĩ thể hiện hiệu quả nhất và Album ấn tượng nhất (Giải Thưởng Album Vàng Tháng 8/2009)
- Nam ca sĩ triển vọng: Dương Triệu Vũ (Zing Music Award 2010)
- Ca sĩ được công chúng là bạn đọc Báo Người Lao Động yêu thích nhất (Giải Mai Vàng 2011)
- Nam nghệ sĩ mới xuất sắc (Zing Music Award 2011)
- Ca Khúc Của Năm – Nhớ rất nhớ ft Bảo Thy (Zing Music Award 2011)
- Video Clip Của Năm – Siêu Nhân (Zing Music Award 2011)

=== Live show ===
- Thiên Thần Trong Đêm – Sân Khấu Lan Anh (ngày 19/3/2010)
- Tour Sinh Viên (Thiên Thần và Sinh Viên) (tháng 10/2010)Thiên Thần Và Người Tình with Mr.Đàm – Sân khấu 126, TP.HCM (13/05 và 14/05/2010)
