= HTV7 =

Television station in Vietnam

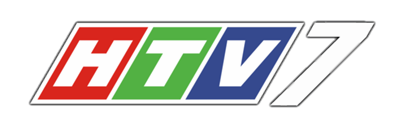
- Country: Vietnam
- Broadcast area: Vietnam, Southeast Asia, Asia.

Programming
- Language: Vietnamese
- Picture format: 1080i HDTV

Ownership
- Owner: Ho Chi Minh City Television
- Sister channels: HTV Channel: HTV1; HTV2 - Vie Channel; HTV3; HTV4; HTV5 - Bchannel; HTV7; HTV9; HTV Thể Thao; HTV Co.op; HTVC channels: HTVC Thuần Việt; HTVC Gia đình HTVC Phụ Nữ; HTVC Ca nhạc HTVC Phim; HTVC Du lịch và Cuộc sống HTVC+

History
- Launched: 1987

Links
- Website: www.htv.com.vn

Availability

Terrestrial
- Satellite: Vinasat 1, Vinasat 2 132 E
- DVB-T2: 33, 36 UHF, 31 UHF.

Streaming media
- FPTPlay: Watch live
- HTVC: Watch live
- htv.com.vn: Watch live

HTV7 is an entertainment sociocultural TV channel in Vietnam, broadcast by Ho Chi Minh City Television since 1987.

== History of formation and development ==
- Before January 27, 1973, this was the channel serving the US Army stationed in Southern Vietnam with the name AFVN, broadcasting on the 11 VHF band.
- From January 27, 1973, AFVN channel stopped broadcasting.
- From April 30, 1975, the Liberation Army took over all materials and headquarters of Radio Saigon, changing the station's name to Liberation Radio Television to broadcast information about the head and cabinet of the Government of the Republic of Vietnam has fallen.
- In 1986, channel HTV7 was broadcast experimentally with the entire duration allowed to continue HTV9 channel to serve color system conversion. Searching the following month, HTV7 spent more time on classifieds, advertising and advertising programs. Channel 7 was tested as a Service Channel – Public Information of Ho Chi Minh City Television.
- 1987: Channel 7 officially broadcast.
- 1990: Channel 7 raised the total broadcast time to 12/7.
- 1994: Channel 7 changed its name to HTV7.
- 1995: HTV7 increased the total broadcasting time to 14/7, from 6:00 am to 12:00 pm, 5:00 pm to 0:00 am on channel 7 VHF in Ho Chi Minh City. At the same time, the HTV7 logo appears in the color R-G-B.
- May 1999: HTV7 started broadcasting live program Bridge music, opening a series of live programs music on TV .
- December 31, 1999: Together with HTV9, broadcast a special program to welcome the new millennium with a record longest length of time at that time in Vietnam to welcome the new year. 2000.
- 2000s: HTV7 broadcasts from 05h30 to 24h00 daily, broadcasts 2 episodes/day of feature films.
- Since 2003, HTV7 changed its new identity. In December of the same year, HTV7 also officially broadcast on the terrestrial digital DVB-T system of HTV, VTC, BTV... At the same time, HTV7 channel is also broadcast analog at Dien Bien, Lam Dong, Hai Phong and some other provinces and cities nationwide.
- May 19, 2005: HTV7 broadcasts "Vietnamese Film Golden Hour" at 21:00 every day from Thursday to Sunday, starting from the movie "Love spiral", from 2012 to 20:00 and extending the time from 2012 to 20:00. broadcast every day.
- 2005: HTV7 and HTV9 are broadcast on Measat satellite.
- June 1, 2005: HTV7 is broadcast 23.5/7.
- June 1, 2008: Officially opening the golden time frame for Gameshow/talkshow at 6:10 p.m. daily.
- Mid-May – Early June 2008: HTV7 launched 2 new news programs: Yesterday's World and 24 Hours World, creating a breakthrough in the newssocial on HTV7.
- June 2008: Broadcast HTV7 high definition HDTV channel on HDTV system of HTVC.
- July 2008: HTV7 is broadcast on Vinasat 1 satellite transmitted by HTV.
- January 1, 2012: The evening program 60 Seconds was released and broadcast with HTV9. Next, "Vietnamese Film Golden Hour" is postponed to 20:05 from Sunday to Thursday.
- Early 2013: Vietnamese Film Golden Hour is added to the time frame at 22:45 from Monday to Friday, mainly replaying old movies that were broadcast on HTV.
- May 19, 2013: HTV7 is broadcast in HD standard.
- October 10, 2014: HTV7 is broadcast on DVB-T2 digital terrestrial digital system on 33 UHF frequency with HD standard along with HTV9
- January 1, 2016: HTV7 broadcasts in the aspect ratio 16:9, HD 1080i, and at the same time changes its appearance.
- June 15, 2016: Stop broadcasting channel HTV7 on analog terrestrial television system.
- October 1, 2016: Upgrading the quality and renewing program content on channel HTV7.
- 2018: Broadcasting in HD on television digital terrestrial system DVB-T2 of VTC on channel 31.

=== Broadcast duration ===
- April 30, 1986 – December 31, 1989: 18h00 – 24h00
- Early 1990s: morning content with HTV9, from 18:00 to 24:00 is separate content:
- 1992 – 1995: 06h00 – 12h00, 18h00 – 24h00.
- 1995 – December 31, 1997: 06:00 – 12:00, 17:00 – 24:00.
- 1998 – early 2000s: 05:30 – 13:00, 14h00 – 24h00.
- early 2000s – 2005: 05h30 – 24h00.
- 2005 – now: 05h00 – 04h30.

== See also ==
- Ho Chi Minh City Television
- HTV9
