= Dương Domic =

Duong Domic
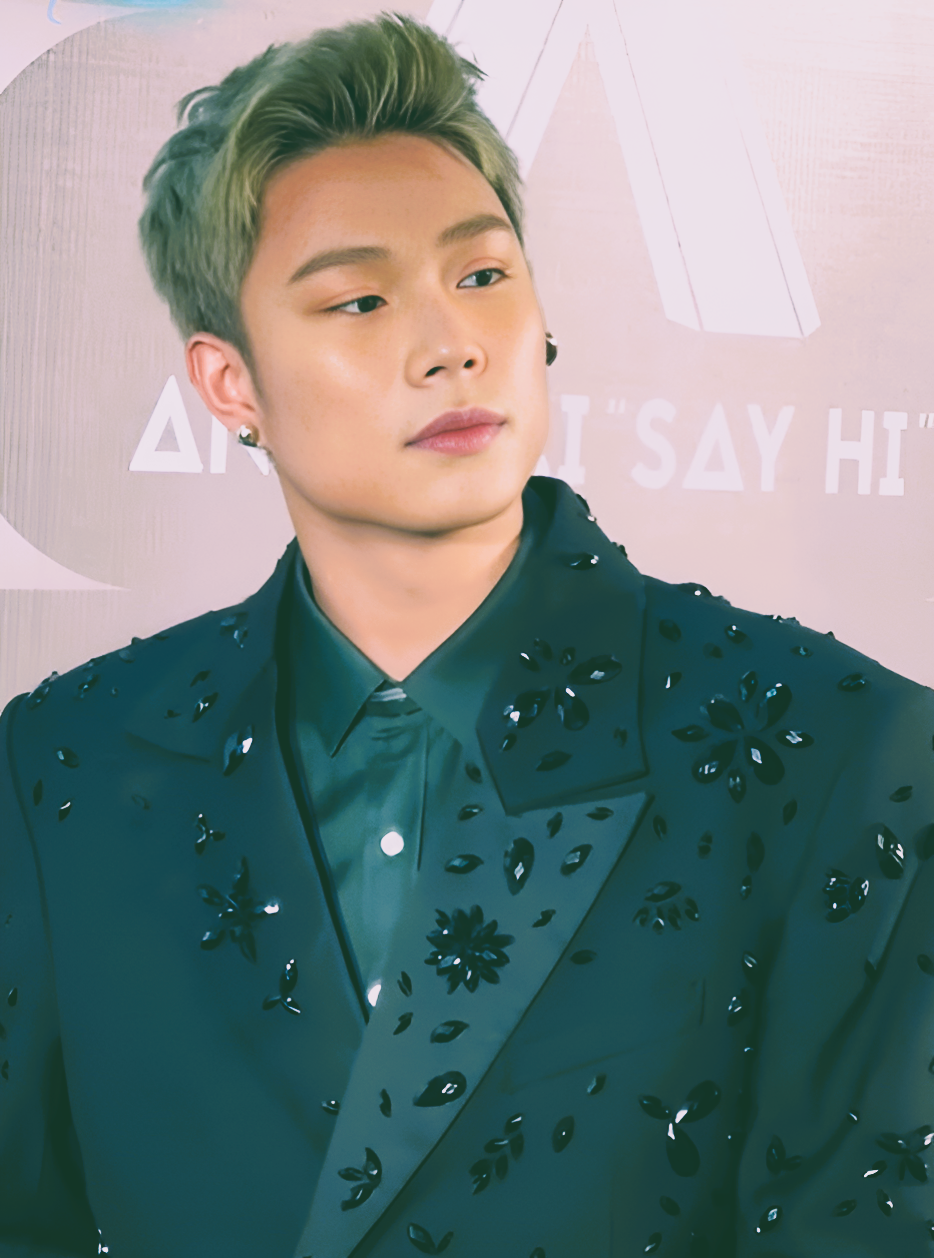
- Duong Domic in 2024
- Born: Tran Dang Duong; August 31, 2000 (age 25); Hải Dương, Vietnam
- Other names: Chàng Bống; Bống khờ
- Education: University of Labor and Social Affairs
- Occupation: Singer-songwriter
- Years active: 2021–present
- Notable work: "Tràn bộ nhớ"; "Mất kết nối"; "Không thời gian"
- Height: 1.85 m (6 ft 1 in)
- Musical career
- Origin: Hải Dương, Vietnam
- Genres: V-pop; dance-pop; ballad; R&B
- Instruments: Vocals; guitar; piano
- Label: DAO Music Entertainment

Tran Dang Duong (born August 31, 2000), better known by his stage name Duong Domic, is a Vietnamese singer-songwriter. He was previously a trainee for the South Korean entertainment company IF Entertainment. However, it wasn't until he participated in the first season of the show Anh trai "say hi" in 2024 that he rose to prominence and became widely known through songs such as "Tràn bộ nhớ", "Mất kết nối", and "Hào quang".

Following Anh trai "say hi", Duong Domic signed with DAO Entertainment and became a member of the boy band MOPIUS alongside Quang Hung MasterD, Jsol, and HURRYKNG. He won the "Best New Face" award at the 27th Làn Sóng Xanh Awards and the "New Artist of the Year" award at the 2025 Dedication Music Awards.

== Life and career ==
=== 2000–2024: Early life and career beginnings ===
Dương Domic was born Trần Đăng Dương on August 31, 2000, in Hải Dương (now part of Hải Phòng) into a family with a tradition in politics. His passion for music emerged while participating in school music competitions. At the age of 14–15, Dương began active in the underground scene in Hanoi, and he had to convince his family many times to get permission to pursue an artistic path. In 2019, he was introduced by friends to audition for the Korean entertainment company IF Entertainment, based in Vietnam, through a singing performance combined with playing an instrument; he frankly shared that he didn't know how to dance at all but eventually passed the casting. From there, he underwent training in vocals, choreography, facial expressions, and etiquette, under the direct guidance of Korean rapper Microdot.

In 2021, after two years of training, Dương became the first Vietnamese solo singer under IF Entertainment to debut. According to his explanation, the stage name Dương Domic is understood in two ways: one is a combination of the phrase "Do Music" and the other is an abbreviation of "Domination." He released his first music video "Candy" in collaboration with rapper Microdot and co-writer Quang Hùng MasterD. The production process for the song was delayed several times over two years, compounded by the fact that the song was made during the COVID-19 pandemic in Vietnam; at one point, he had to live and work at the company for four consecutive months.

However, after "Candy" was released, his musical activities almost came to a standstill, and he fell into a state of stress and self-doubt due to a lack of inspiration and themes to explore. He chose to participate in several television programs to learn and improve his skills; one of which was Sàn đấu vũ đạo (Dance Arena), where judge Minh Hằng gave him feedback about losing control on stage just because he forgot the choreography. By October 2022, his management company suddenly closed due to many difficulties, right at the time he was planning a comeback. At that moment, he left the company and immediately released works he composed or co-composed. Dương Domic's first song titled "Những câu nói anh từng chờ" (Words I once waited for) was released on YouTube on November 14 as a visualizer, followed 8 days later by the second song "Là em, chính em" (It's you, exactly you); however, neither created a significant impact. During this period, Dương also faced many hardships as he had to handle all production stages himself and had to borrow so much that he fell into debt; making a living and releasing songs both depended on part-time work. Dương Domic also sought out many large companies, musicians, and producers, but they all refused to collaborate.

=== 2024–present: Anh Trai "Say Hi" and joining DAO Entertainment ===
In early 2024, he returned to the music race with two songs "A đến Ă" and "Yêu em 2 ngày" (Love you for 2 days), with related content to form a complete love story. These were also the first music videos where he had a co-star, Nguyễn Minh Hà. Both videos failed to create a significant buzz upon release, garnering only over 1 million views on YouTube. That same year, he decided to participate in the program Anh Trai "Say Hi" with the hope of making a mark in his music career. In the early days of the show, Dương admitted he was shy and "did nothing" but search for where he belonged.

In the first performance night of Anh Trai "Say Hi", Dương Domic performed the ballad "Sóng vỗ vỡ bờ" (Waves crashing on the shore) combined with choreography alongside Anh Tú, Erik, Phạm Anh Duy, and JSOL. He made an initial impression on the public thanks to his visuals, which were compared to a K-pop idol, and his emotional vocals. By the next competition night, he caught the attention of captains Hieuthuhai, Song Luân, Isaac, and Negav, who all wanted him in their teams; he eventually decided to join Negav's team. He performed the act "Hào quang" (Aura) with Rhyder and Pháp Kiều, a song praised for successfully harmonizing sound, dance, storytelling, and lighting effects, even though the initial demo had caused stress for the whole group. With good results, Dương officially became the captain of a group including Song Luân, Lou Hoàng, and Quang Hùng MasterD to collaborate with Bảo Anh for the song "Cứ để anh ta rời đi" (Just let him leave) in the third round; this song later reached number two on the YouTube Music trending chart, number 9 on iTunes, and number 8 on NhacCuaTui.

In the fourth round, he chose the theme of mothers to compose and perform the song "Bao lời con chưa nói" (So many words I haven't said) with Song Luân, Anh Tú, Quang Trung, and Anh Tú Atus – this song was considered Dương's breakout performance since the start of the show. Although his team only placed second that night, he advanced straight to the program's final, where he performed "Tràn bộ nhớ" (Memory Full) for his solo part and "Sao hạng A" (A-list Star) with HIEUTHUHAI, Song Luân, and JSOL. Ultimately, Dương Domic was named in the Top 10 and won the "Most Impressive Transformation" award.

Compared to before joining Anh trai "say hi", his Instagram followers were only a mere 3,000, but by the final, the number had increased to over 400,000. He also named his fandom community Dopamine, which has over 128,000 members. On July 1, 2024, Dương Domic officially joined the entertainment company DAO Entertainment. The collaboration with this company stemmed from his belief that "they respect the path I'm taking" and "bring benefits, trust, and joy to both sides." After joining the new company, he announced his debut extended play (EP) Dữ liệu quý (Precious Data) on November 22 with a total of four songs including "Chập chờn" (Flickering), "Tràn bộ nhớ" (Memory Full), "Pin dự phòng" (Power Bank), and "Mất kết nối" (Disconnected). One month after its release, the song "Mất kết nối" from the EP reached 23 million views, ranking top 1 on YouTube Vietnam's Trending Music, top 2 on Spotify Vietnam's Daily chart, and top 45 on Spotify's global viral chart. This song also became the first champion of The Official Vietnam Chart announced by the International Federation of the Phonographic Industry (IFPI) when the chart was launched in January 2025.

On November 26, 2024, NOMAD MGMT Vietnam – a member company of DatVietVAC Group Holdings – announced the formation of the boy band MOPIUS with four members, including him along with Quang Hùng MasterD, Jsol, and HURRYKNG. The group's name is understood as a variation of the phrase "Möbius Band" symbolizing "modernity" and "constant innovation." The group released their first song on December 3 titled "Làn ưu tiên" (Priority Lane). Their second song, "Bản thiết kế" (The Blueprint), was debuted during the first concert of the show Em xinh "say hi" on September 13, 2025.

On August 16, 2025, during a music night held in Da Nang, Dương Domic confirmed he would release new products in September and simultaneously organize fan meetings across three regions of the country within the year. The first official fan meeting "DOMIE HOMIE – The House of Dopamine" took place on September 20 in Hanoi, the same day he released the song "Không thời gian" (Timeless) and achieved strong results. In December, Dương Domic continued by releasing "nhungnhungnhung" in collaboration with Quờ.

In late May 2026, Dương Domic was announced as one of the 24 artists participating in the music reality TV show Tinh Hà "Say Hi". This event has marked his return to the "Say Hi" universe, a series of entertainment programs produced by DatVietVAC, following the success of Anh Trai "Say Hi" in 2024.

== Artistic Style ==
=== Musical Style and Genres ===
In an interview with Elle Man Vietnam, Duong Domic stated that everything happening around him serves as the inspiration for his musical works. He also asserted that the common thread in his pieces is that "the emotion must touch the heart."

When speaking with VOH, he mentioned that despite debuting under the management of a South Korean company, he maintains that his music is not significantly influenced by K-pop; instead, he approached music through the compositions of the late songwriter Trinh Cong Son and was later influenced by US-UK music. With a passion for choreography, Duong chose a training environment that combines singing and dancing to perfect his stage performance skills.

Furthermore, he has gradually developed as a versatile artist, not only performing but also songwriting and playing instruments. This musical mindset is also reflected in products like the EP released in November, in which the songs carry different colors but are built around a common theme and message. In addition to main genres like pop, R&B, and hip-hop, Duong Domic stated he will continue to experiment with many other genres to expand his style and avoid creative repetition.

=== Fashion and influence ===
Duong Domic has appeared on magazine covers such as Hoa Học Trò, and Elle Man Vietnam. He has also participated in fashion shoots for L'Officiel Vietnam with Levi's, Lyhan and Men's Folio Vietnam.

== Commercial partnerships ==
- On March 8, 2025, Duong Domic collaborated with and became the face of the Kotex brand in a campaign to spread messages about women's care.
- On September 9, 2025, Duong Domic collaborated as a representative (advertising aspect) for the FPT Long Chau system (specifically the Vaccination Center segment) with the campaign "Proactive Generation – Preventing diseases through proactive vaccination."
- In late September 2025, Duong Domic collaborated and became the brand ambassador for the Realme 15 series, associated with the message "Live Real Every Moment."
- In December 2025, Duong Domic collaborated with STYLE by PNJ to launch the FOREVER Collection, including rings, bracelets, earrings, and charms in a Unisex style.
