= Anh trai "say hi" season 1 =

2024 season of Vietnamese television show

Anh trai "say hi"
- Season 1
- Hosted by: Trấn Thành
- No. of contestants: 30
- Winner: HIEUTHUHAI
- Runner-up: Rhyder
- No. of episodes: 14

Release
- Original network: HTV2 - Vie Channel; ON Vie Giải Trí; VieON
- Original release: June 15 – September 14, 2024

Season chronology
- Next → Season 2

The first season of the show Anh trai "say hi" was broadcast on the television channels HTV2 - Vie Channel, ON Vie Giải Trí, and the VieON app from June 15 to September 14, 2024. The main theme of this season is "The Stars."

The winner of this season was HIEUTHUHAI, and the runner-up was Rhyder. The winning group lineup, named Anh trai "Best 5", was established, consisting of Isaac, Đức Phúc, Quang Hùng MasterD, HIEUTHUHAI, and Rhyder.

== List of "brothers" ==
The list of 30 "brothers" ("anh trai" in Vietnamese) appearing in the first season of Anh trai "say hi" was announced on April 22, 2024, one day after the conclusion of the show's first filming session. These "brothers" are artists active in various artistic fields. According to the production unit's explanation, this is a purely Vietnamese program organized exclusively for 30 singers and rappers who possess fresh youth, a desire for breakthroughs, and a dream of bringing fame to local culture.

For consistency, the artist's stage name would be used with Vietnamese's tone marks.

Anh trai	Occupation	Year of birth	Final result
HIEUTHUHAI	Rapper	1999	WINNER
Rhyder	Singer-songwriter/Rapper	2001	RUNNER-UP
Isaac	Singer/Actor	1988	BEST 5
Đức Phúc	Singer	1996	BEST 5
Quang Hùng MasterD	Singer-songwriter/Music Producer	1997	BEST 5
Anh Tú Atus	Singer/Actor	1993	TOP 10
Erik	Singer	1997	TOP 10
HURRYKNG	Rapper	1999	TOP 10
Dương Domic	Singer-songwriter	2000	TOP 10
Negav	Singer-songwriter/Rapper	2001	TOP 10
Song Luân	Actor/Singer	1991	TOP 16
Anh Tú	Singer	1992	TOP 16
JSOL	Singer	1997	TOP 16
Quân A.P	Singer	1997	TOP 16
Pháp Kiều	Singer-songwriter/Rapper	2001	TOP 16
Captain Boy	Singer-songwriter/Rapper	2003	TOP 16
Quang Trung	Actor/Singer	1994	ELIMINATED
Ali Hoàng Dương	Singer	1996	ELIMINATED
WEAN	Singer-songwriter/Rapper/Actor	1998	ELIMINATED
Hùng Huỳnh	Singer/Dancer/Model	1999	ELIMINATED
Lou Hoàng	Singer-songwriter	1994	ELIMINATED
Gin Tuấn Kiệt	Actor/Singer	1994	ELIMINATED
Vũ Thịnh	Singer	1995	ELIMINATED
Hải Đăng Doo	Singer	2000	ELIMINATED
Phạm Anh Duy	Singer	1992	ELIMINATED
Phạm Đình Thái Ngân	Singer	1993	ELIMINATED
Đỗ Phú Quí	Actor/Singer/MC	1993	ELIMINATED
Công Dương	Actor	1994	ELIMINATED
Nicky	Singer-songwriter	1995	ELIMINATED
Tage	Rapper	2001	ELIMINATED

Color Legend

Best 5 brothers
Top 10 finalists
Top 16 finalists
Eliminated at Livestage 4
Eliminated at Livestage 3
Eliminated at Livestage 2

== Guests ==
Name	Occupation	Year of birth	Role	Episode of appearance
Korapat Kirdpan/Nanon	Singer/Actor	2000	International guest, featured on the "Don't care" performance	1, 2
Nguyễn Thúc Thùy Tiên	Model/Pageant queen	1998	Guest dancer for the "Nỗi đau ngây dại" (Silly pain) performance	2
Lê Dương Bảo Lâm	Actor/Comedian	1989	Butler/secondary host	3
Bảo Anh	Singer/Actor	1992	Guest feature for the "Cứ để anh ta rời đi" (Let him leave) performance	6, 7
Orange	Singer/Songwriter	1997	Guest feature for the "Ngáo ngơ" (Foolish) performance	6, 7
Vũ Thảo My	Singer	1997	Guest feature for the "Ngân nga" (Hum) performance	6, 7
LyLy	Singer/Songwriter	1996	Guest performer with "Người tình của nắng" (Sunshine's lover) performance	6, 7, 8
tlinh	Singer-songwriter/Rapper	2000	Guest performer for the "I'm thinking about you" performance	6, 8
Lâm Bảo Ngọc	Singer	1996	Guest performer for the "Regret" performance	7
Hoa Xù	Tiktoker	2004	Guest dancers for the "I'm thinking about you" performance	8
Xuân Ca	Model/Singer/Tiktoker	2001	Guest dancers for the "I'm thinking about you" performance	8
Sơn Lâm	Dancer	1995	Dance battle judges	8
Đăng Quân	Choreographer/Dancer	2000	Dance battle judges	8
MC Buck	Choreographer/Dancer	1990	Dance battle judges	8
Phước Lee	Dancer/B-boy	1995	Dance battle judges	8
C2 Low	Dancer	1995	Dance battle judges	8
Nicky	Dancer/Rapper/Singer/MC	1995	Guest performer for the "Anh trai nước Việt" (Brothers of Vietnam) performance	10
Đỗ Phú Quí	Actor/Singer/MC	1993	Guest performer for the "Anh trai nước Việt" (Brothers of Vietnam) performance	10
Phạm Anh Duy	Singer	1992	Guest performer for the "Anh trai nước Việt" (Brothers of Vietnam) performance	10
Phạm Đình Thái Ngân	Singer	1993	Guest performer for the "Anh trai nước Việt" (Brothers of Vietnam) performance	10
Lou Hoàng	Singer-songwriter	1994	Guest performer for the "Anh trai nước Việt" (Brothers of Vietnam) performance	10
Kim Xuân	Actress	1956	Guest performer for the "Bao lời con chưa nói" (Words I haven't said) performance	10
Nguyễn Hoàng Thảo Uyên	Dancer	1994	Guest performer for the "Chân thành" (Sincerely) performance	10
Ciin	Tiktoker/Dancer	1997	Guest performer for the "SOS" performance	10
Trần Tiểu Vy	Model	2000	Guest performer for the "Kim phút kim giờ" (Minutes and hours)	11
Trần Quốc Anh	Actor	1998	Guest performer for the "Kim phút kim giờ" (Minutes and hours)	11
Jmi Ko	Violinist	1982	Guest performers for the "Anh biết rồi" (I know) performance	12
Phương Công Band	Band/Musicians		Guest performers for the "Anh biết rồi" (I know) performance	12
Đỗ Hải Anh	Dancer	1990	Guest performers for the "Cứ mỗi sáng anh lại..." (Every morning I keep...) performance	12
Cao Hà Đức Anh	Singer-Songwriter	2002	Guest performers for the "Cứ mỗi sáng anh lại..." (Every morning I keep...) performance	12
Tage	Rapper	2001	Guest feature for the "Lâu không gặp" (Long time no see) performance	12
Grey D	Singer-songwriter	2000	Guest performer for the "Chàng khờ thủy cung" (Silly aquarium guy) performance	12
Hùng Huỳnh	Singer/Dancer/Model	1999	Guest performer for the "Đóa phù dung cuối cùng" (The last cotton flower) performance	13
WEAN	Singer-songwriter/Rapper/Actor	1998	Guest performers for the "Airplane Mode" performance	13
antransax	Saxophonist/Singer-songwriter	2004	Guest performers for the "Airplane Mode" performance	13
Alan Walker	DJ/Music producer	1997	Finale guest performer	14
JustaTee	Singer-Songwriter/Rapper	1991	Guest feature for the "Anh em gọi là có mặt ngay" (Right here whenever my brothers call) performance	14

== Show Content ==
=== Livestage 1 ===
Before meeting with each others, all 30 brothers have to participate in the show's minigames (called the "Star DNA" test) to earn points, which then decided the order of choosing the songs. The six songs (with the number of members) that are presented for the first performance are: "Hút" (Draw) (7 members), "No far, no star" (6 members), "10/10" (4 members), "Nỗi đau ngây dại" (Silly pain) (3 members), "Sóng vỗ vỡ bờ" (Waves crashed the land) (5 members), and "Don't care" (5 members). Choosing a song will automatically assign them to one out of 2 armies, with army 1 consists of: "Hút" (Draw), "Don't care" and "Nỗi đau ngây dại" (Silly pain); while army 2 consits of "No far, no star", "10/10" and "Sóng vỗ vỡ bờ" (Wave crashed the land). Each army consisted of 15 members, with one person designated as the captain of that alliance (chosen by that army's members).

Out of the six songs: "Hút" (Draw) and "Sóng vỗ vỡ bờ" (Wave crashed the land) are the songs have to be performed on a custom set. Furthermore, "Sóng vỗ vỡ bờ" is the only song without a choreography demo.

The process of choosing the songs is as follow:

- One by one, each person entered the selection room and chose one of the six songs. After a successful selection, they moved to the group corresponding to that song.
- The six people with the highest scores had the right to choose their song first, along with the right to invalidate the first choice of any other brother.
- If a brother chose an invalid song (the song already had the required number of members or was blocked by the choice of one of the six highest-scoring brothers), that person had to choose again until the request was accepted. In the event that a brother was blocked by more than one of the top six scorers, that person could only choose a song after all corresponding blocks were exhausted.
- When only one song remained available, those who had not yet had their turn to choose automatically became members of that group.
- After all of the brothers have finished the song choosing process, the guest (Nanon Korapat) will choose a song that he prefers. The brothers that also chose the same song as Nanon would receive an extra 50 individual points, in the scenario that their performance is in the top 3 most voted performances of the night.
- Each team then choose a brother (excluding Nanon) as the team leader.

The final lineup for the Livestage 1 are (team captains are highlighted in bold, while army captains are in italics):

Army 1:

- "Hút" (Draw): **Lou Hoàng,** Ali Hoàng Dương, Quân A.P, Nicky, WEAN, Hải Đăng Doo, Pháp Kiều
- "Don't Care": **Issac,** Gin Tuấn Kiệt, Vũ Thịnh, Quang Hùng MasterD, Negav (featuring Nanon Korapat)
- "Nỗi đau ngây dại" (Silly pain): **Đức Phúc,** Công Dương, HIEUTHUHAI

Army 2:

- "No far, no star": **Song Luân**, Đỗ Phú Quí, HURRYKNG, Rhyder, Tage, Captain
- "10/10": **Phạm Đình Thái Ngân,** Anh Tú Atus, Quang Trung, Hùng Huỳnh
- "Sóng vỗ vỡ bờ" (Wave crashed the land): **Anh Tú,** Phạm Anh Duy, JSOL, Erik, Dương Domic

There were two rounds of competition for this stage.

- Round 1 – Armies battle: Each alliance would perform a remake of the show's theme song (The star). After each performance, 300 studio audience members would vote for the performing army. The army with the higher vote count would earn 50 additional individual points for each of its member.
- Round 2 – Teams battle: Each team would perform their song. After each performance, 300 studio audience members would then vote for each of the team's members individually to compose their individual score (which would then be added with any bonus points they have). At the end of the night, they would then vote for two out of the six performances, to make up their team score. (Note: The studio audience had 60 seconds to vote for their favorite brothers after each performance. Each audience member could vote for multiple brothers at once, but could only cast a maximum of one vote per brother. These votes were added to each brother's individual score and could affect whether they advanced or were eliminated.)

At the end of the first round, army 2 won the armies battle, which mean all of its members receive 50 extra individual points. (Note: Anh Tú Atus gave 5 individual points each to the members who composed the song in the group (Rhyder, Captain, Dương Domic, HURRYKNG, and Tage). Another 5 points were given to music director JustaTee, effectively going unused.) For the second round, the top three performances of the night are "No far, no star", "Don't care" and "Nỗi đau ngây dại" (Silly pain), which ranked 1st, 2nd and 3rd respectively. Each of the team's members received an extra 100, 75 and 50 points, respectively. As the "Don't care" team met the requirement of being in the same performance as the guest and placing in the top three of the night, they also received another 50 individual points.

No brothers were eliminated after Livestage 1.

Livestage 1
Episode 1 – Armies battle (June 15, 2024)
Army	Order	Song [English translation, if applicable] (Composer & Producers)	Members	Votes	Result
1	1	"I.C.O.N" (JustaTee, Darrys, Quang Hùng MasterD, WEAN, HIEUTHUHAI, Hải Đăng Doo, Negav, Pháp Kiều)	**Isaac**	267	Lost
1	1	"I.C.O.N" (JustaTee, Darrys, Quang Hùng MasterD, WEAN, HIEUTHUHAI, Hải Đăng Doo, Negav, Pháp Kiều)	Lou Hoàng	267	Lost
1	1	"I.C.O.N" (JustaTee, Darrys, Quang Hùng MasterD, WEAN, HIEUTHUHAI, Hải Đăng Doo, Negav, Pháp Kiều)	Công Dương	267	Lost
1	1	"I.C.O.N" (JustaTee, Darrys, Quang Hùng MasterD, WEAN, HIEUTHUHAI, Hải Đăng Doo, Negav, Pháp Kiều)	Gin Tuấn Kiệt	267	Lost
1	1	"I.C.O.N" (JustaTee, Darrys, Quang Hùng MasterD, WEAN, HIEUTHUHAI, Hải Đăng Doo, Negav, Pháp Kiều)	Nicky	267	Lost
1	1	"I.C.O.N" (JustaTee, Darrys, Quang Hùng MasterD, WEAN, HIEUTHUHAI, Hải Đăng Doo, Negav, Pháp Kiều)	Vũ Thịnh	267	Lost
1	1	"I.C.O.N" (JustaTee, Darrys, Quang Hùng MasterD, WEAN, HIEUTHUHAI, Hải Đăng Doo, Negav, Pháp Kiều)	Ali Hoàng Dương	267	Lost
1	1	"I.C.O.N" (JustaTee, Darrys, Quang Hùng MasterD, WEAN, HIEUTHUHAI, Hải Đăng Doo, Negav, Pháp Kiều)	Đức Phúc	267	Lost
1	1	"I.C.O.N" (JustaTee, Darrys, Quang Hùng MasterD, WEAN, HIEUTHUHAI, Hải Đăng Doo, Negav, Pháp Kiều)	Quân A.P	267	Lost
1	1	"I.C.O.N" (JustaTee, Darrys, Quang Hùng MasterD, WEAN, HIEUTHUHAI, Hải Đăng Doo, Negav, Pháp Kiều)	Quang Hùng MasterD	267	Lost
1	1	"I.C.O.N" (JustaTee, Darrys, Quang Hùng MasterD, WEAN, HIEUTHUHAI, Hải Đăng Doo, Negav, Pháp Kiều)	WEAN	267	Lost
1	1	"I.C.O.N" (JustaTee, Darrys, Quang Hùng MasterD, WEAN, HIEUTHUHAI, Hải Đăng Doo, Negav, Pháp Kiều)	HIEUTHUHAI	267	Lost
1	1	"I.C.O.N" (JustaTee, Darrys, Quang Hùng MasterD, WEAN, HIEUTHUHAI, Hải Đăng Doo, Negav, Pháp Kiều)	Hải Đăng Doo	267	Lost
1	1	"I.C.O.N" (JustaTee, Darrys, Quang Hùng MasterD, WEAN, HIEUTHUHAI, Hải Đăng Doo, Negav, Pháp Kiều)	Negav	267	Lost
1	1	"I.C.O.N" (JustaTee, Darrys, Quang Hùng MasterD, WEAN, HIEUTHUHAI, Hải Đăng Doo, Negav, Pháp Kiều)	Pháp Kiều	267	Lost
2	2	"Bảnh" [Handsome] (JustaTee, BeeBB, HURRYKNG, Dương Domic, Rhyder, Tage, Captain)	Song Luân	**281**	**Win** (+50 individual points)
2	2	"Bảnh" [Handsome] (JustaTee, BeeBB, HURRYKNG, Dương Domic, Rhyder, Tage, Captain)	Phạm Anh Duy	**281**	**Win** (+50 individual points)
2	2	"Bảnh" [Handsome] (JustaTee, BeeBB, HURRYKNG, Dương Domic, Rhyder, Tage, Captain)	Anh Tú	**281**	**Win** (+50 individual points)
2	2	"Bảnh" [Handsome] (JustaTee, BeeBB, HURRYKNG, Dương Domic, Rhyder, Tage, Captain)	Phạm Đình Thái Ngân	**281**	**Win** (+50 individual points)
2	2	"Bảnh" [Handsome] (JustaTee, BeeBB, HURRYKNG, Dương Domic, Rhyder, Tage, Captain)	**Anh Tú Atus**	**281**	**Win** (+50 individual points)
2	2	"Bảnh" [Handsome] (JustaTee, BeeBB, HURRYKNG, Dương Domic, Rhyder, Tage, Captain)	Đỗ Phú Quí	**281**	**Win** (+50 individual points)
2	2	"Bảnh" [Handsome] (JustaTee, BeeBB, HURRYKNG, Dương Domic, Rhyder, Tage, Captain)	Quang Trung	**281**	**Win** (+50 individual points)
2	2	"Bảnh" [Handsome] (JustaTee, BeeBB, HURRYKNG, Dương Domic, Rhyder, Tage, Captain)	JSOL	**281**	**Win** (+50 individual points)
2	2	"Bảnh" [Handsome] (JustaTee, BeeBB, HURRYKNG, Dương Domic, Rhyder, Tage, Captain)	Erik	**281**	**Win** (+50 individual points)
2	2	"Bảnh" [Handsome] (JustaTee, BeeBB, HURRYKNG, Dương Domic, Rhyder, Tage, Captain)	Hùng Huỳnh	**281**	**Win** (+50 individual points)
2	2	"Bảnh" [Handsome] (JustaTee, BeeBB, HURRYKNG, Dương Domic, Rhyder, Tage, Captain)	HURRYKNG	**281**	**Win** (+50 individual points)
2	2	"Bảnh" [Handsome] (JustaTee, BeeBB, HURRYKNG, Dương Domic, Rhyder, Tage, Captain)	Dương Domic	**281**	**Win** (+50 individual points)
2	2	"Bảnh" [Handsome] (JustaTee, BeeBB, HURRYKNG, Dương Domic, Rhyder, Tage, Captain)	Rhyder	**281**	**Win** (+50 individual points)
2	2	"Bảnh" [Handsome] (JustaTee, BeeBB, HURRYKNG, Dương Domic, Rhyder, Tage, Captain)	Tage	**281**	**Win** (+50 individual points)
2	2	"Bảnh" [Handsome] (JustaTee, BeeBB, HURRYKNG, Dương Domic, Rhyder, Tage, Captain)	Captain	**281**	**Win** (+50 individual points)
Episode 2 – Teams battle (June 22, 2024)
Army	Performing order	Song [English translation, if applicable] (Composer & Producers)	Members	Rank	Result
1	1	"Hút" [Draw] (August (Fillinus), BeeBB, Liem Hieu, Lou Hoàng, WEAN, Hải Đăng Doo, Pháp Kiều)	**Lou Hoàng**	4	N/A
1	1	"Hút" [Draw] (August (Fillinus), BeeBB, Liem Hieu, Lou Hoàng, WEAN, Hải Đăng Doo, Pháp Kiều)	Ali Hoàng Dương	4	N/A
1	1	"Hút" [Draw] (August (Fillinus), BeeBB, Liem Hieu, Lou Hoàng, WEAN, Hải Đăng Doo, Pháp Kiều)	Quân A.P	4	N/A
1	1	"Hút" [Draw] (August (Fillinus), BeeBB, Liem Hieu, Lou Hoàng, WEAN, Hải Đăng Doo, Pháp Kiều)	Nicky	4	N/A
1	1	"Hút" [Draw] (August (Fillinus), BeeBB, Liem Hieu, Lou Hoàng, WEAN, Hải Đăng Doo, Pháp Kiều)	WEAN	4	N/A
1	1	"Hút" [Draw] (August (Fillinus), BeeBB, Liem Hieu, Lou Hoàng, WEAN, Hải Đăng Doo, Pháp Kiều)	Hải Đăng Doo (Note: Brother was blocked twice)	4	N/A
1	1	"Hút" [Draw] (August (Fillinus), BeeBB, Liem Hieu, Lou Hoàng, WEAN, Hải Đăng Doo, Pháp Kiều)	Pháp Kiều	4	N/A
2	2	"No far, no star" (August (Fillinus), Minsicko, HURRYKNG, Rhyder, Tage, Captain)	**Song Luân (Note: Brother was blocked)**	**1**	**100 individual points**
2	2	"No far, no star" (August (Fillinus), Minsicko, HURRYKNG, Rhyder, Tage, Captain)	Đỗ Phú Quí	**1**	**100 individual points**
2	2	"No far, no star" (August (Fillinus), Minsicko, HURRYKNG, Rhyder, Tage, Captain)	HURRYKNG	**1**	**100 individual points**
2	2	"No far, no star" (August (Fillinus), Minsicko, HURRYKNG, Rhyder, Tage, Captain)	Rhyder	**1**	**100 individual points**
2	2	"No far, no star" (August (Fillinus), Minsicko, HURRYKNG, Rhyder, Tage, Captain)	Tage	**1**	**100 individual points**
2	2	"No far, no star" (August (Fillinus), Minsicko, HURRYKNG, Rhyder, Tage, Captain)	Captain	**1**	**100 individual points**
2	3	"10/10" (Coldie, Darrys, Anh Tú Atus)	**Phạm Đình Thái Ngân**	6	N/A
2	3	"10/10" (Coldie, Darrys, Anh Tú Atus)	Anh Tú Atus	6	N/A
2	3	"10/10" (Coldie, Darrys, Anh Tú Atus)	Quang Trung	6	N/A
2	3	"10/10" (Coldie, Darrys, Anh Tú Atus)	Hùng Huỳnh	6	N/A
2	4	"Sóng vỗ vỡ bờ" [Wave crashed the land] (Trungg I.U, Tieman)	Phạm Anh Duy	4	N/A
2	4	"Sóng vỗ vỡ bờ" [Wave crashed the land] (Trungg I.U, Tieman)	**Anh Tú**	4	N/A
2	4	"Sóng vỗ vỡ bờ" [Wave crashed the land] (Trungg I.U, Tieman)	JSOL	4	N/A
2	4	"Sóng vỗ vỡ bờ" [Wave crashed the land] (Trungg I.U, Tieman)	Erik	4	N/A
2	4	"Sóng vỗ vỡ bờ" [Wave crashed the land] (Trungg I.U, Tieman)	Dương Domic	4	N/A
1	5	"Don't care" (Coldie, BeeBB, Negav, Nanon Korapat)	**Isaac**	2	75 + 50 individual points
1	5	"Don't care" (Coldie, BeeBB, Negav, Nanon Korapat)	Gin Tuấn Kiệt	2	75 + 50 individual points
1	5	"Don't care" (Coldie, BeeBB, Negav, Nanon Korapat)	Vũ Thịnh	2	75 + 50 individual points
1	5	"Don't care" (Coldie, BeeBB, Negav, Nanon Korapat)	Quang Hùng MasterD	2	75 + 50 individual points
1	5	"Don't care" (Coldie, BeeBB, Negav, Nanon Korapat)	Nanon Korapat	2	75 + 50 individual points
1	5	"Don't care" (Coldie, BeeBB, Negav, Nanon Korapat)	Negav	2	75 + 50 individual points
1	6	"Nỗi đau ngây dại" [Silly pain] (Trungg I.U, Darrys, Kewtiie, Đức Phúc, HIEUTHUHAI)	Công Dương	3	50 individual points
1	6	"Nỗi đau ngây dại" [Silly pain] (Trungg I.U, Darrys, Kewtiie, Đức Phúc, HIEUTHUHAI)	**Đức Phúc**	3	50 individual points
1	6	"Nỗi đau ngây dại" [Silly pain] (Trungg I.U, Darrys, Kewtiie, Đức Phúc, HIEUTHUHAI)	HIEUTHUHAI	3	50 individual points

- Brother is the captain for the performance.
- Brother is a special guest.

=== Livestage 2 ===
Before entering the second performance round, a team selection round was held. The 30 "brothers" were divided into four teams, with two 8-members teams and two 7-members teams. Four brothers with the highest total individual scores after Live Stage 1 (Negav, Song Luân, Isaac, and HIEUTHUHAI) became the four captains for this round. The remaining brothers were placed into two areas: "Sỏi Đá" (Rocky - consisting of 11 brothers ranked 20–30) and "Màu Mỡ" (Fertile - consisting of 15 brothers ranked 5–19). Each captain then, through the process of randomization, know how many members will be in their team. Song Luân and Isaac's teams will be 8-members, while HIEUTHUHAI and Negav's teams will be 7-members. The four captains then went through each area in turn to recruit members.

- In the "Rocky" area, each captain had to send an invitation to any two brothers; each captain's departure time was 60 seconds apart based on their individual score ranking. Brothers who accepted an invitation from a captain became members of that team, while those who declined or did not receive an invitation automatically moved to the "Đảo Hoang" (Deserted island) area to wait for captains who still needed members to form a team.
- In the "Fertile" area, the brothers wrote down the name of the captain they wished to join, and the captains decided whom they wanted to recruit. A brother joined the team if the captain accepted his wish; otherwise, he also had to move to the "Đảo Hoang" area.
- In the "Deserted island" area, the four captains conducted a random draw to select the remaining brothers for their teams.

After completing the team division, the brothers returned to the common house where guest butler Lê Dương Bảo Lâm was waiting. Under the butler's guidance, they participated in missions to earn bonus points at the common house, including the "Protect the Captain" game at the pool (adding 100 bonus points and priority song selection for the winning team) and drawing lots in each room (adding/subtracting 20 points or no points; some lots came with a task to perform to earn 20 bonus points).

The next day, the brothers were taken to a gallery featuring eight new songs for the second round; each song had different requirements for staging and expertise. Here, the teams selected songs through an auction, where team members had to contribute at least 70% of the team's total individual points to form an auction fund. The remaining points were converted and added to the team score at Live Stage 2 (the individual scores of all brothers from Live Stage 1 were announced at this time, along with bonus/penalty points from the common house missions).

The auction was divided into two rounds, with four songs for each round. The team that placed the highest bid for each song won the right to perform it (each team could only take one song per auction round). Teams that failed to win a song in each round were defaulted to perform the last song, with the price being half of the points in the team's current auction fund. Between the two auction rounds, teams had the right to add more points to the auction fund to ensure the fund had at least 400 points for use in the next round (these additional points were not affected if the team's points were halved in the second auction round). After two auction rounds, all unused points in the team's auction fund were discarded.

After all teams had two songs, each team was further divided into two sub-groups of three or four members. Each team had to participate in two performing nights, with the first round including all four-person groups and the second night being the remaining members. 400 studio audience members voted for each individual brothers after each performance and for their most favorite group after each night.

The final lineup and songs for Livestage 2 is (captain's name are highlighted in bold):

Negav's team:

- Catch me if you can: **Negav**, Công Dương, Nicky, Quang Hùng MasterD
- Hào Quang (Aura): Dương Domic, Rhyder, Pháp Kiều

Song Luân's team:

- Thi sĩ (Poet): Phạm Anh Duy, Đức Phúc, Erik, Tage
- You: **Song Luân**, Anh Tú Atus, Quang Trung, Captain

Isaac's team:

- Hít "Drama" (Inhaling "drama"): **Isaac**, Anh Tú, Đỗ Phú Quí, WEAN
- You had me at Hello: Phạm Đình Thái Ngân, Lou Hoàng, Gin Tuấn Kiệt, Hải Đăng Doo

HIEUTHUHAI's team:

- Love Sand: **HIEUTHUHAI**, Vũ Thịnh, Ali Hoàng Dương, JSOL
- Đầu đội sừng (Horns on head): Quân A.P, Hùng Huỳnh, HURRYKNG

At the end of Livestage 2, HIEUTHUHAI's team had the highest total group score after two rounds, resulting in every member in his team being safe, no matter their individual points. Meanwhile, six brothers with the lowest individual scores from the remaining three teams had to leave the show. Those are: Công Dương, Nicky from Negav's team, Phạm Anh Duy, Tage from Song Luân's team, Đỗ Phú Quí and Phạm Đình Thái Ngân from Isaac's team.

Livestage 2
Episode 4 – First performance night (July 6, 2024)
Team (Note: Team names were determined by rankings in the race to win two electric car keys to move to the common house.)	Performing order	Song [English translation, if applicable] (Composer & Producers)	Members	Votes		Result
3	1	"Love Sand" (Vũ Ngọc Bích, DBaola, Kewtiie, HIEUTHUHAI)	Vũ Thịnh (Note: Desert Island Area: Brother rejected by captain)	**387**		Safe
3	1	"Love Sand" (Vũ Ngọc Bích, DBaola, Kewtiie, HIEUTHUHAI)	Ali Hoàng Dương	**387**		Safe
3	1	"Love Sand" (Vũ Ngọc Bích, DBaola, Kewtiie, HIEUTHUHAI)	JSOL	**387**		Safe
3	1	"Love Sand" (Vũ Ngọc Bích, DBaola, Kewtiie, HIEUTHUHAI)	**HIEUTHUHAI**	**387**		Safe
4	2	"Catch Me If You Can" (RedT, Minsicko, BeeBB, Công Dương, Nicky, Quang Hùng MasterD, Negav)	Công Dương (Note: Desert Island Area: Brother not accepted by captain)	316		Eliminated
4	2	"Catch Me If You Can" (RedT, Minsicko, BeeBB, Công Dương, Nicky, Quang Hùng MasterD, Negav)	Nicky	316		Eliminated
4	2	"Catch Me If You Can" (RedT, Minsicko, BeeBB, Công Dương, Nicky, Quang Hùng MasterD, Negav)	Quang Hùng MasterD	316		Safe
4	2	"Catch Me If You Can" (RedT, Minsicko, BeeBB, Công Dương, Nicky, Quang Hùng MasterD, Negav)	**Negav**	316		Safe
2	3	"Thi sĩ" [Poet] (BEATTHATHITS, Tieman, Sony Tran, Đoàn Minh Vũ, Phạm Anh Duy, Tage)	Phạm Anh Duy	334		Eliminated
2	3	"Thi sĩ" [Poet] (BEATTHATHITS, Tieman, Sony Tran, Đoàn Minh Vũ, Phạm Anh Duy, Tage)	Đức Phúc	334		Safe
2	3	"Thi sĩ" [Poet] (BEATTHATHITS, Tieman, Sony Tran, Đoàn Minh Vũ, Phạm Anh Duy, Tage)	Erik	334		Safe
2	3	"Thi sĩ" [Poet] (BEATTHATHITS, Tieman, Sony Tran, Đoàn Minh Vũ, Phạm Anh Duy, Tage)	Tage	334		Eliminated
1	4	"Hít "drama"" [Inhaling "drama"] (August (Fillinus), DBaola, WEAN)	**Isaac**	372		Safe
1	4	"Hít "drama"" [Inhaling "drama"] (August (Fillinus), DBaola, WEAN)	Anh Tú	372		Safe
1	4	"Hít "drama"" [Inhaling "drama"] (August (Fillinus), DBaola, WEAN)	Đỗ Phú Quí	372		Eliminated
1	4	"Hít "drama"" [Inhaling "drama"] (August (Fillinus), DBaola, WEAN)	WEAN	372		Safe
Episode 5 – Second performance night (July 13, 2024)
Team	Performing order	Song [English translation, if applicable] (Composer & Producers)	Members	Votes	Final score (Note: The composite score at Live Stage 2 is calculated as 80% of the total score after two rounds and 20% of the remaining points after the auction.)	Result
1	1	"You had me at Hello" (Nguyễn Bảo Trọng, Minsicko, Tieman, Lou Hoàng, Hải Đăng Doo)	Phạm Đình Thái Ngân	283	572.6	Eliminated
1	1	"You had me at Hello" (Nguyễn Bảo Trọng, Minsicko, Tieman, Lou Hoàng, Hải Đăng Doo)	Lou Hoàng	283	572.6	Safe
1	1	"You had me at Hello" (Nguyễn Bảo Trọng, Minsicko, Tieman, Lou Hoàng, Hải Đăng Doo)	Gin Tuấn Kiệt	283	572.6	Safe
1	1	"You had me at Hello" (Nguyễn Bảo Trọng, Minsicko, Tieman, Lou Hoàng, Hải Đăng Doo)	Hải Đăng Doo	283	572.6	Safe
4	2	"Hào quang" [Aura] (BAOVU, Darrys, Trần Việt Hoàng (Sir Hoang), Rhyder, Pháp Kiều)	Dương Domic (Note: Desert Island Area: Brother rejected captain)	**368**	603.4	Safe
4	2	"Hào quang" [Aura] (BAOVU, Darrys, Trần Việt Hoàng (Sir Hoang), Rhyder, Pháp Kiều)	Rhyder	**368**	603.4	Safe
4	2	"Hào quang" [Aura] (BAOVU, Darrys, Trần Việt Hoàng (Sir Hoang), Rhyder, Pháp Kiều)	Pháp Kiều	**368**	603.4	Safe
2	3	"You" (Coldie, Minsicko, Dreamble, Song Luân, Captain)	**Song Luân**	295	503.2	Safe
2	3	"You" (Coldie, Minsicko, Dreamble, Song Luân, Captain)	Anh Tú Atus	295	503.2	Safe
2	3	"You" (Coldie, Minsicko, Dreamble, Song Luân, Captain)	Quang Trung	295	503.2	Safe
2	3	"You" (Coldie, Minsicko, Dreamble, Song Luân, Captain)	Captain	295	503.2	Safe
3	4	"Đầu đội sừng" [Horns on head] (Graykee (Fillinus), CM1X, DBaola, Kewtiie, HURRYKNG)	Quân A.P	354	**629.8**	Safe
3	4	"Đầu đội sừng" [Horns on head] (Graykee (Fillinus), CM1X, DBaola, Kewtiie, HURRYKNG)	Hùng Huỳnh	354	**629.8**	Safe
3	4	"Đầu đội sừng" [Horns on head] (Graykee (Fillinus), CM1X, DBaola, Kewtiie, HURRYKNG)	HURRYKNG	354	**629.8**	Safe

- Brother is the team's captain.
- Highest points in total/specific night

=== Livestage 3 ===
In the third performance round, the 24 remaining brothers were divided into six teams of four members each. HIEUTHUHAI, captain of the safe team from Livestage 2, continued his role as a captain for this round. The remaining five captains were determined: three were the brothers with the highest individual scores from Live Stage 2 (Rhyder, Isaac, Quân A.P), and two were chosen through a random draw (Anh Tú, Dương Domic). The team selection process proceeded as follows:

- First Round ("Perfect Match"): 18 non-leader brothers were divided equally into three groups—Gorgeous, Sparkling, and Shimmering—based on their rankings. Each captain chose one person from each group (totaling three people), and the contestants in the three groups also chose the captain they wanted to join. If the choices of the captain and the member matched, the member was assigned to that captain's team; otherwise, they had to go to the Desert island area.
- Second Round ("To Choose or Not to Choose"): Each person in the Desert island area was called into the waiting room, and the captains raised their boards to either choose or not choose that person for their team. If only one captain agreed to choose, the contestant joined that team; if two or more captains chose them, the contestant made the final decision. Those not chosen by any captain or who rejected all choices had to wait for captains with incomplete teams to pick them last, with higher-scoring captains getting priority.

After being introduced to six demo songs for the performance round, the contestants were organized into four different intellectual games, each consisting of six representatives from the six teams. Each team wagered a number of points to challenge each game out of an initial 1000 points provided; the winning team kept their wagered points (and could gain points from the opponent), while the losing team lost their challenged points. The total points collected after the four games determined the order in which teams chose their songs and guests (each guest were tied to a specific song).

The lineup for Livestage 3 is (captain's name are highlighted in bold):

Ngáo ngơ (Mindless): HIEUTHUHAI, Anh Tú Atus, JSOL, Erik (guest: Orange)

Regret: Quân A.P, Quang Trung, Ali Hoàng Dương, Pháp Kiều (guest: Lâm Bảo Ngọc)

Ngân nga (Hum): Isaac, Gin Tuấn Kiệt, HURRYKNG, Negav (guest: Vũ Thảo My)

Cứ để anh ta rời đi (Let him leave): Dương Domic, Song Luân, Lou Hoàng, Quang Hùng MasterD (guest: Bảo Anh)

Người tình của nắng (Sunshine's lover): Anh Tú, Vũ Thịnh, Hải Đăng Doo, Captain (guest: LyLy)

I'm thinking about you: Rhyder, Đức Phúc, Wean, Hùng Huỳnh

For Live Stage 3, the teams had to go through two competition rounds:

- Round 1 – Song Battle: Teams performed alongside a female guest artist invited by the show. 500 studio audience members voted for their favorite contestants after each performance; the team score was calculated as the sum of the individual scores of the team members.
- Round 2 – Dance Battle: Teams competed in dancing across three rounds, with each team sending one member to participate in each round. In Round 1, each person performed a 60-second routine with the support of up to four dancers (which could include team members). In Rounds 2 and 3, members from each team performed to the same provided music upon the MC's signal. Voting results after each round were decided by 5 judges and 500 studio audience members, with the two teams with the lowest scores in each round being eliminated. The three highest-ranking teams from this battle had 200 points, 100 points, and 50 points respectively added to their total team score.

At the end of Live Stage 3, the three teams with the highest total scores after two rounds—Rhyder, HIEUTHUHAI, and Quân A.P—were safe and advanced to the next round. The four individuals with the lowest individual scores among the remaining teams were eliminated: Gin Tuấn Kiệt (Isaac's team), Lou Hoàng (Dương Domic's team), Vũ Thịnh and Hải Đăng Doo (Anh Tú's team).

Livestage 3
First Round: Song Battle
Team	Order	Song [English translation, if applicable] (Composer & Producers)	Members	Guest singer	Performance score	Total Score	Result
Episode 7 (August 3, 2024) (Note: Since Episode 6 was postponed by one week from the original schedule to broadcast programs during the National Mourning of General Secretary Nguyễn Phú Trọng, Episode 7 was also moved to a new time.)
HIEUTHUHAI	1	"Ngáo ngơ" [Mindless] (Tăng Nhật Tuệ, Foxxx Team, Kewtiie, Orange, HIEUTHUHAI)	Anh Tú Atus	Orange	1616	**1716**	Safe
HIEUTHUHAI	1	"Ngáo ngơ" [Mindless] (Tăng Nhật Tuệ, Foxxx Team, Kewtiie, Orange, HIEUTHUHAI)	JSOL **(Note: Desert Island Area: Non-matching contestant)**	Orange	1616	**1716**	Safe
HIEUTHUHAI	1	"Ngáo ngơ" [Mindless] (Tăng Nhật Tuệ, Foxxx Team, Kewtiie, Orange, HIEUTHUHAI)	Erik	Orange	1616	**1716**	Safe
HIEUTHUHAI	1	"Ngáo ngơ" [Mindless] (Tăng Nhật Tuệ, Foxxx Team, Kewtiie, Orange, HIEUTHUHAI)	**HIEUTHUHAI**	Orange	1616	**1716**	Safe
Quân A.P	2	"Regret" (Cao Ha Duc Anh, Minh Gao, Minsicko, Quân A.P, Pháp Kiều)	Quang Trung **(Note: Contestant sent to Desert Island for the second time)**	Lâm Bảo Ngọc	1513	**1713**	Safe
Quân A.P	2	"Regret" (Cao Ha Duc Anh, Minh Gao, Minsicko, Quân A.P, Pháp Kiều)	Ali Hoàng Dương	Lâm Bảo Ngọc	1513	**1713**	Safe
Quân A.P	2	"Regret" (Cao Ha Duc Anh, Minh Gao, Minsicko, Quân A.P, Pháp Kiều)	**Quân A.P**	Lâm Bảo Ngọc	1513	**1713**	Safe
Quân A.P	2	"Regret" (Cao Ha Duc Anh, Minh Gao, Minsicko, Quân A.P, Pháp Kiều)	Pháp Kiều	Lâm Bảo Ngọc	1513	**1713**	Safe
Isaac	3	"Ngân nga" [Hum] (Vũ Đức Mạnh, Minsicko, Kado, HURRYKNG, Negav)	**Isaac**	Vũ Thảo My	1693		Safe
Isaac	3	"Ngân nga" [Hum] (Vũ Đức Mạnh, Minsicko, Kado, HURRYKNG, Negav)	Gin Tuấn Kiệt	Vũ Thảo My	1693		Eliminated
Isaac	3	"Ngân nga" [Hum] (Vũ Đức Mạnh, Minsicko, Kado, HURRYKNG, Negav)	HURRYKNG	Vũ Thảo My	1693		Safe
Isaac	3	"Ngân nga" [Hum] (Vũ Đức Mạnh, Minsicko, Kado, HURRYKNG, Negav)	Negav	Vũ Thảo My	1693		Safe
Dương Domic	4	"Cứ để anh ta rời đi" [Let him leave] (August (Fillinus), Trần Việt Hoàng (Sir Hoang), Minsicko, Dreamble, Song Luân, Lou Hoàng, Quang Hùng MasterD, Dương Domic)	Song Luân	Bảo Anh	1650		Safe
Dương Domic	4	"Cứ để anh ta rời đi" [Let him leave] (August (Fillinus), Trần Việt Hoàng (Sir Hoang), Minsicko, Dreamble, Song Luân, Lou Hoàng, Quang Hùng MasterD, Dương Domic)	Lou Hoàng	Bảo Anh	1650		Eliminated
Dương Domic	4	"Cứ để anh ta rời đi" [Let him leave] (August (Fillinus), Trần Việt Hoàng (Sir Hoang), Minsicko, Dreamble, Song Luân, Lou Hoàng, Quang Hùng MasterD, Dương Domic)	Quang Hùng MasterD	Bảo Anh	1650		Safe
Dương Domic	4	"Cứ để anh ta rời đi" [Let him leave] (August (Fillinus), Trần Việt Hoàng (Sir Hoang), Minsicko, Dreamble, Song Luân, Lou Hoàng, Quang Hùng MasterD, Dương Domic)	**Dương Domic**	Bảo Anh	1650		Safe
Episode 8 (August 10, 2024)
Anh Tú	5	"Người tình của nắng" [Sunshine's lover] (Hoàng Dũng, Dreamble, Lê Nhâm, Cà Pháo, Dũng D.X, LyLy, Hải Đăng Doo, Captain)	**Anh Tú**	LyLy	1448		Safe
Anh Tú	5	"Người tình của nắng" [Sunshine's lover] (Hoàng Dũng, Dreamble, Lê Nhâm, Cà Pháo, Dũng D.X, LyLy, Hải Đăng Doo, Captain)	Vũ Thịnh	LyLy	1448		Eliminated
Anh Tú	5	"Người tình của nắng" [Sunshine's lover] (Hoàng Dũng, Dreamble, Lê Nhâm, Cà Pháo, Dũng D.X, LyLy, Hải Đăng Doo, Captain)	Hải Đăng Doo	LyLy	1448		Eliminated
Anh Tú	5	"Người tình của nắng" [Sunshine's lover] (Hoàng Dũng, Dreamble, Lê Nhâm, Cà Pháo, Dũng D.X, LyLy, Hải Đăng Doo, Captain)	Captain	LyLy	1448		Safe
Rhyder	6	"I'm thinking about you" (RedT, Cao Ha Duc Anh, D.A, Minsicko, BeeBB, WEAN, tlinh, Rhyder)	Đức Phúc	tlinh	1714	**1764**	Safe
Rhyder	6	"I'm thinking about you" (RedT, Cao Ha Duc Anh, D.A, Minsicko, BeeBB, WEAN, tlinh, Rhyder)	WEAN	tlinh	1714	**1764**	Safe
Rhyder	6	"I'm thinking about you" (RedT, Cao Ha Duc Anh, D.A, Minsicko, BeeBB, WEAN, tlinh, Rhyder)	Hùng Huỳnh	tlinh	1714	**1764**	Safe
Rhyder	6	"I'm thinking about you" (RedT, Cao Ha Duc Anh, D.A, Minsicko, BeeBB, WEAN, tlinh, Rhyder)	**Rhyder**	tlinh	1714	**1764**	Safe
Second Round: Dance Battle
Order	Captain	Member	Total Score	Rank		Round Result	
Round 1 – Showcase
1	Dương Domic	Song Luân	**835**	**3**		**Round 2**	
2	Isaac	Gin Tuấn Kiệt	713	6		Eliminated	
3	Quân A.P	Pháp Kiều	**876**	**2**		**Round 2**	
4	Rhyder	Hùng Huỳnh	**907**	**1**		**Round 2**	
5	HIEUTHUHAI	Erik	**832**	**4**		**Round 2**	
6	Anh Tú	Vũ Thịnh	723	5		Eliminated	
Round 2 – Cypher Battle
1	Rhyder	Hùng Huỳnh	724	3		Eliminated/+50 team points	
2	HIEUTHUHAI	JSOL	**852**	**1**		**Round 3**	
3	Dương Domic	Dương Domic	652	4		Eliminated	
4	Quân A.P	Quang Trung	**741**	**2**		**Round 3**	
Round 3 – Final Cypher Battle
1	HIEUTHUHAI	Anh Tú Atus	707	2		+100 team points	
2	Quân A.P	Ali Hoàng Dương	**850**	**1**		**+200 team points**	

- Brother is the team's captain.
- Safe teams' score

=== Livestage 4 ===
This is the semifinal round of Anh Trai "Say Hi". In this performance round, 20 contestants were divided into four teams of five, with captains determined through self-nomination and voting. In addition to the four contestants at the top of the Live Stage 3 rankings automatically becoming captain candidates, three other candidates were chosen through self-nomination and random drawing, and one candidate was selected through individual nominations from the contestants. After voting (each candidate had four "Select" votes, while others had four "Select" and four "Blank" votes), the four people receiving the most "Select" votes became the four captains: Rhyder, Erik, HURRYKNG, and Anh Tú Atus.

The remaining contestants then entered a staging camp one by one and went to one of four tents, corresponding to a captain's room, to persuade the captain to pick them for the team. If the captain agreed, the member joined the team; otherwise, they had to go to the tent for the Desert island area (note that captains had to accept the first person who entered their room into their team). The four lowest-ranked contestants from the previous round (excluding those already chosen as captains for this round) were given priority to choose first; from the fifth person onwards, members drew lots for each other to determine the selection order, starting with the MC. Captains who did not have enough members would select additional members from the Desert Island to complete their lineup, and members on the Desert Island at this point had no right to refuse the captain's choice.

Next, the teams participated in four physical games to accumulate points and earn the order for choosing songs. There were a total of eight songs in this round, and each team had to perform two songs: one developed from a demo track and one written from a type beat (only background music provided, teams had to compose lyrics based on the provided music).

The lineup for Livestage 4 is (captain's name are highlighted in bold):

- **Rhyder,** Ali Hoàng Dương, Quang Hùng MasterD, WEAN, Captain (songs: Chân thành (Sincerely) & SOS)
- **Erik,** Đức Phúc, Quân A.P, JSOL, Hùng Huỳnh (songs: Anh trai nước Việt (Brothers of Vietnam) & Sau đêm nay (After tonight))
- **HURRYKNG,** Isaac, HIEUTHUHAI, Negav, Pháp Kiều (songs: Walk & Kim phút kim giờ (Minutes, hours))
- **Anh Tú Atus,** Song Luân, Anh Tú, Quang Trung, Dương Domic (songs: Bao lời con chưa nói (Words I haven't said) & Đều là của em (All yours))

The four teams at Live Stage 4 were divided into two groups, with two teams competing against each other in each group. As in previous performance nights, 500 studio audience members scored the team members after the performance ended; the winning team in each matchup was the one with a higher total score from its members. The winning teams from the two groups met to compete for first/second place, and the losing teams met to compete for third/fourth place. Only the overall first-place team of the round was safe and went straight to the next round; for the remaining three teams, the second-place team had two members enter the danger zone, the third-place team had three members, and the last-place team had all members fall into the danger zone, except for the person with the highest individual score in the team. Six brothers with the lowest scores among the eight (excluding the saved brother) had to leave the show. Notably, the first-place team had the right to save one person in the danger zone as decided by the team members (regardless of whether that person was slated for elimination).

At the end of Live Stage 4, HURRYKNG's team won first place overall and all members were safe; the team decided to use their save for JSOL. After saving, Song Luân, Quang Trung (Anh Tú Atus' team), Ali Hoàng Dương, Captain, WEAN (Rhyder's team) and Hùng Huỳnh (Erik's team) were eliminated; however, a surprise rescue round was conducted to save two more brothers for the finale. The already-finalists would vote for two brothers who were still at the risk of eliminated that they think should be in the finale. Based on the votings, Song Luân and Captain are the two final brothers who would be moving on to the last round. As such, the brothers who were officially eliminated at this round are: Quang Trung (Anh Tú Atus' team), Ali Hoàng Dương, WEAN (Rhyder's team) and Hùng Huỳnh (Erik's team).

Livestage 4
Episode 10 – August 18, 2024
Group Stage
Group	Team	Song [English translation, if applicable] (Composer & Producers)	Members	Votes	
2	D	"Anh trai nước Việt" [Brothers of Vietnam] (Đức Phúc, Quân A.P, Erik, August (Fillinus), Wishty Eazy (Fillinus), AnNgo (Fillinus), Thuy MX (Fillinus), Khắc Hưng, Hino)	Đức Phúc	2151	
2	D	"Anh trai nước Việt" [Brothers of Vietnam] (Đức Phúc, Quân A.P, Erik, August (Fillinus), Wishty Eazy (Fillinus), AnNgo (Fillinus), Thuy MX (Fillinus), Khắc Hưng, Hino)	Quân A.P	2151	
2	D	"Anh trai nước Việt" [Brothers of Vietnam] (Đức Phúc, Quân A.P, Erik, August (Fillinus), Wishty Eazy (Fillinus), AnNgo (Fillinus), Thuy MX (Fillinus), Khắc Hưng, Hino)	JSOL	2151	
2	D	"Anh trai nước Việt" [Brothers of Vietnam] (Đức Phúc, Quân A.P, Erik, August (Fillinus), Wishty Eazy (Fillinus), AnNgo (Fillinus), Thuy MX (Fillinus), Khắc Hưng, Hino)	**Erik**	2151	
2	D	"Anh trai nước Việt" [Brothers of Vietnam] (Đức Phúc, Quân A.P, Erik, August (Fillinus), Wishty Eazy (Fillinus), AnNgo (Fillinus), Thuy MX (Fillinus), Khắc Hưng, Hino)	Hùng Huỳnh	2151	
2	C	"Bao lời con chưa nói" [Words I haven't said] (Dương Domic, Trần Việt Hoàng (Sir Hoang))	Song Luân	**2209**	
2	C	"Bao lời con chưa nói" [Words I haven't said] (Dương Domic, Trần Việt Hoàng (Sir Hoang))	Anh Tú	**2209**	
2	C	"Bao lời con chưa nói" [Words I haven't said] (Dương Domic, Trần Việt Hoàng (Sir Hoang))	**Anh Tú Atus**	**2209**	
2	C	"Bao lời con chưa nói" [Words I haven't said] (Dương Domic, Trần Việt Hoàng (Sir Hoang))	Quang Trung	**2209**	
2	C	"Bao lời con chưa nói" [Words I haven't said] (Dương Domic, Trần Việt Hoàng (Sir Hoang))	Dương Domic	**2209**	
1	A	"Chân thành" [Sincerely] (MaiQuinn, Nick, Darrys, Dũng D.X, WEAN, Rhyder, Captain)	Ali Hoàng Dương	2184	
1	A	"Chân thành" [Sincerely] (MaiQuinn, Nick, Darrys, Dũng D.X, WEAN, Rhyder, Captain)	Quang Hùng MasterD	2184	
1	A	"Chân thành" [Sincerely] (MaiQuinn, Nick, Darrys, Dũng D.X, WEAN, Rhyder, Captain)	WEAN	2184	
1	A	"Chân thành" [Sincerely] (MaiQuinn, Nick, Darrys, Dũng D.X, WEAN, Rhyder, Captain)	**Rhyder**	2184	
1	A	"Chân thành" [Sincerely] (MaiQuinn, Nick, Darrys, Dũng D.X, WEAN, Rhyder, Captain)	Captain	2184	
1	B	"Walk" (HURRYKNG, HIEUTHUHAI, Negav, Pháp Kiều, BeeBB, Kewtiie)	Isaac	**2204**	
1	B	"Walk" (HURRYKNG, HIEUTHUHAI, Negav, Pháp Kiều, BeeBB, Kewtiie)	**HURRYKNG**	**2204**	
1	B	"Walk" (HURRYKNG, HIEUTHUHAI, Negav, Pháp Kiều, BeeBB, Kewtiie)	HIEUTHUHAI	**2204**	
1	B	"Walk" (HURRYKNG, HIEUTHUHAI, Negav, Pháp Kiều, BeeBB, Kewtiie)	Negav	**2204**	
1	B	"Walk" (HURRYKNG, HIEUTHUHAI, Negav, Pháp Kiều, BeeBB, Kewtiie)	Pháp Kiều	**2204**	
Ranking Round
Match	Team	Song [English translation, if applicable] (Composer & Producers)	Members	Votes	Result (Note: The result of moving on or being eliminated is only recorded once in the team's subsequent performance.)
Third Place Match	D	"Sau đêm nay" [After tonight] (Vũ Ngọc Bích, BeeBB, Hino, Đức Phúc, Quân A.P, JSOL, Erik, Hieu Bae, Pháo)	Đức Phúc	**2128**	Safe
Third Place Match	D	"Sau đêm nay" [After tonight] (Vũ Ngọc Bích, BeeBB, Hino, Đức Phúc, Quân A.P, JSOL, Erik, Hieu Bae, Pháo)	Quân A.P	**2128**	Safe
Third Place Match	D	"Sau đêm nay" [After tonight] (Vũ Ngọc Bích, BeeBB, Hino, Đức Phúc, Quân A.P, JSOL, Erik, Hieu Bae, Pháo)	JSOL	**2128**	Saved
Third Place Match	D	"Sau đêm nay" [After tonight] (Vũ Ngọc Bích, BeeBB, Hino, Đức Phúc, Quân A.P, JSOL, Erik, Hieu Bae, Pháo)	**Erik**	**2128**	Safe
Third Place Match	D	"Sau đêm nay" [After tonight] (Vũ Ngọc Bích, BeeBB, Hino, Đức Phúc, Quân A.P, JSOL, Erik, Hieu Bae, Pháo)	Hùng Huỳnh	**2128**	Eliminated
Third Place Match	A	"SOS" (WEAN, Rhyder, Captain, Darrys, Majin, Dũng D.X)	Ali Hoàng Dương	2121	Eliminated
Third Place Match	A	"SOS" (WEAN, Rhyder, Captain, Darrys, Majin, Dũng D.X)	Quang Hùng MasterD	2121	Safe
Third Place Match	A	"SOS" (WEAN, Rhyder, Captain, Darrys, Majin, Dũng D.X)	WEAN	2121	Eliminated
Third Place Match	A	"SOS" (WEAN, Rhyder, Captain, Darrys, Majin, Dũng D.X)	**Rhyder**	2121	Safe
Third Place Match	A	"SOS" (WEAN, Rhyder, Captain, Darrys, Majin, Dũng D.X)	Captain	2121	Revived
Episode 11 – August 24, 2024
Final	B	"Kim phút kim giờ" [Minutes, hours] (DC Tâm, Nick, Kado, Darrys, HURRYKNG, HIEUTHUHAI, Negav, Pháp Kiều)	Isaac	**2287**	Safe
Final	B	"Kim phút kim giờ" [Minutes, hours] (DC Tâm, Nick, Kado, Darrys, HURRYKNG, HIEUTHUHAI, Negav, Pháp Kiều)	**HURRYKNG**	**2287**	Safe
Final	B	"Kim phút kim giờ" [Minutes, hours] (DC Tâm, Nick, Kado, Darrys, HURRYKNG, HIEUTHUHAI, Negav, Pháp Kiều)	HIEUTHUHAI	**2287**	Safe
Final	B	"Kim phút kim giờ" [Minutes, hours] (DC Tâm, Nick, Kado, Darrys, HURRYKNG, HIEUTHUHAI, Negav, Pháp Kiều)	Negav	**2287**	Safe
Final	B	"Kim phút kim giờ" [Minutes, hours] (DC Tâm, Nick, Kado, Darrys, HURRYKNG, HIEUTHUHAI, Negav, Pháp Kiều)	Pháp Kiều	**2287**	Safe
Final	C	"Đều là của em" [All yours] (Satila Hồng Vịnh, CM1X, Tap, Minsicko, D.A, Song Luân)	Song Luân	2167	Revived
Final	C	"Đều là của em" [All yours] (Satila Hồng Vịnh, CM1X, Tap, Minsicko, D.A, Song Luân)	Anh Tú	2167	Safe
Final	C	"Đều là của em" [All yours] (Satila Hồng Vịnh, CM1X, Tap, Minsicko, D.A, Song Luân)	**Anh Tú Atus**	2167	Safe
Final	C	"Đều là của em" [All yours] (Satila Hồng Vịnh, CM1X, Tap, Minsicko, D.A, Song Luân)	Quang Trung	2167	Eliminated
Final	C	"Đều là của em" [All yours] (Satila Hồng Vịnh, CM1X, Tap, Minsicko, D.A, Song Luân)	Dương Domic	2167	Safe

- Contestant is the team captain.
- Winning team of the match.
- Overall winning team of the round.

=== Livestage 5 – Grand Finale ===
The team selection for the finale took place in a simulated corporate office setting. Here, the four captains (the four highest scorers from Live Stage 4) and the remaining contestants were separated into two different rooms; they could only communicate via telephone and individual rankings without knowing the identity of the caller or each other's specific ranks. Captains formed teams of four for this round and had to select members through an "emergency call" format, with a total of three calling rounds.

- In the first round, each captain called a member of their choice based on ranking, in an order determined by drawing lots. If the member agreed, they moved to the successful team formation area; otherwise, they moved to the "Desert Island" area.
- In the second round, the four lowest-ranked members called a captain of their choice. If the captain agreed, the member moved to the successful team formation area; otherwise, they had to go to the Desert Island.
- In the third round, based on the provided ranking list of the remaining brothers, the four captains called the members they desired for their team (members could not refuse the captain's invitation). Teams that were still short on members were supplemented with contestants from the Desert Island.

The newly formed teams participated in three games to determine the song selection order, similar to the previous round. Each contestant in the finale had to perform two acts: a solo performance and a group performance (a song developed from a type beat chosen by the team).

The lineup for the final round is (captain's highlighted in bold):

- **Tình đầu quá chén (Overdosed first love): Quang Hùng MasterD,** Erik, Negav, Pháp Kiều
- **Anh em gọi là có mặt ngay (Always there for my brothers): Đức Phúc,** Anh Tú, Quân A.P, Captain
- **Ngạo nghễ (Arrogant): Anh Tú Atus,** Isaac, HURRYKNG, Rhyder
- **Sao hạng A (A-list star): HIEUTHUHAI,** Song Luân, JSOL, Dương Domic

All 16 finalists would also collaborate with guest DJ Alan Walker in a special performance.

For the final round, the audience voted online via the VieON app to choose the winners across three voting periods corresponding to the three finale episodes. In the final episode (broadcast live), the five people with the most audience votes formed an "all-rounder group," with the top vote-getter becoming the show's champion. Under this format, the five highest-voted individuals who earned the title Anh Trai "Best 5" were Isaac, Đức Phúc, Quang Hùng MasterD, winner HIEUTHUHAI, and runner-up Rhyder.

Additionally, five sub-awards were given to outstanding individuals and performance groups (each worth 50 million VND):

- The Best Leader, awarded to HIEUTHUHAI.
- The Best Transformation, awarded to Dương Domic.
- The Best Performer, awarded to Erik.
- The Best Group Performance, awarded to "Ngáo ngơ".
- The Best Hit – Most viewed and listened to song across the show's platforms, awarded to "Catch Me If You Can".

During the awards night, the artists donated a portion or all of their prize money to HTV's "Chung một tấm lòng" fund to support Northern provinces facing hardships following the 2024 storms and floods.

Livestage 5 - Finale
Episodes 12 & 13 – Finale part 1 – Solo Performances (August 31 & September 7, 2024)
Order	VCode	Song [English translation, if applicable] (Composer & Producers)	Brother	Votes (Note: Except for the five members of the winning group, the specific vote counts and rankings of the remaining contestants were not announced on television or social media.)	Debut result (Note: Results in this table are marked as "Successful" with the corresponding debut position if the contestant became a member of the debut group, or "Unsuccessful" if they did not make the group. A total of five contestants debuted from this list.)
1	12	"Anh biết rồi" [I know] (Rhyder, Dũng D.X)	Rhyder	875,079	Successful
2	08	"Cứ mỗi sáng anh lại.." [Every morning I keep...] (Cao Ha Duc Anh, Minsicko, Darrys, Majin)	Quân A.P	—	Unsuccessful
3	13	"Kim tự tháp" [Pyramid] (Captain, Dũng D.X)	Captain	—	Unsuccessful
4	16	"Lâu không gặp" [Long time no see] (Song Luân, Tage, Darrys, Majin)	Song Luân	—	Unsuccessful
5	09	"Khiêu vũ dưới trăng" [Dancing under the moon] (Hiếu Bae, Erik, Hino)	Erik	—	Unsuccessful
6	03	"Quay đi quay lại" [Turn back and forth] (HIEUTHUHAI, Kewtiie)	HIEUTHUHAI	1,061,492	Successful
7	10	"Em không muốn một mình" [You don't want to be alone] (Hà Kiểm, Madily, Minsicko, Minh Gao, Anh Tú Atus)	Anh Tú Atus	—	Unsuccessful
8	11	"Chàng khờ thủy cung" [Silly aquarium guy] (Negav, Grey D)	Negav	—	Unsuccessful
9	15	"Đóa phù dung cuối cùng" [Last cotton flower] (Thanh Hưng, Vitagen)	Đức Phúc	512,412	Successful
10	07	"Tràn bộ nhớ" [Memory overflow] (Dương Domic, Trần Việt Hoàng (Sir Hoang))	Dương Domic	—	Unsuccessful
11	05	"Colors" (Pháp Kiều, Dreamble)	Pháp Kiều	—	Unsuccessful
12	14	"Gọi cho anh" [Call me] (Coldie, Minsicko, Dreamble) (Note: The song uses a sample from "Nơi anh không thuộc về".)	Isaac	517,311	Successful
13	02	"Tình cuối cùng" [Last love] (JSOL, Hino)	JSOL	—	Unsuccessful
14	06	"Đóa hồng chơi vơi" [Adrifted rose] (Nguyễn Thương, Tieman)	Anh Tú	—	Unsuccessful
15	01	"Trói em lại" [Hold you back] (Quang Hùng MasterD, Xuân Định K.Y)	Quang Hùng MasterD	604,759	Successful
16	04	"Airplane Mode" (HURRYKNG, WEAN, Minsicko, Minh Gao)	HURRYKNG	—	Unsuccessful
Episode 14 – Finale part 2 – Group Performances (September 14, 2024)
Order	Group	Song Performed (Author)		Members	
Special performance		"The Spectre" – "Who I Am" – "Alone" – "Fire!" (Alan Walker, Coldie, Cao Ha Duc Anh)		16 finalists	
1	4	"Tình đầu quá chén" [Overdosed first love] (Quang Hùng MasterD, Xuân Định K.Y, Negav, Pháp Kiều)		**Quang Hùng MasterD**	
1	4	"Tình đầu quá chén" [Overdosed first love] (Quang Hùng MasterD, Xuân Định K.Y, Negav, Pháp Kiều)		Erik	
1	4	"Tình đầu quá chén" [Overdosed first love] (Quang Hùng MasterD, Xuân Định K.Y, Negav, Pháp Kiều)		Negav	
1	4	"Tình đầu quá chén" [Overdosed first love] (Quang Hùng MasterD, Xuân Định K.Y, Negav, Pháp Kiều)		Pháp Kiều	
2	3	"Anh em gọi là có mặt ngay" [Always there for my brothers] (Đức Phúc, Captain, JustaTee, Dũng D.X, Megazetz)		Anh Tú	
2	3	"Anh em gọi là có mặt ngay" [Always there for my brothers] (Đức Phúc, Captain, JustaTee, Dũng D.X, Megazetz)		**Đức Phúc**	
2	3	"Anh em gọi là có mặt ngay" [Always there for my brothers] (Đức Phúc, Captain, JustaTee, Dũng D.X, Megazetz)		Quân A.P	
2	3	"Anh em gọi là có mặt ngay" [Always there for my brothers] (Đức Phúc, Captain, JustaTee, Dũng D.X, Megazetz)		Captain	
3	2	"Ngạo nghễ" [Arrogant] (Anh Tú Atus, HURRYKNG, Rhyder, Kado)		Isaac	
3	2	"Ngạo nghễ" [Arrogant] (Anh Tú Atus, HURRYKNG, Rhyder, Kado)		**Anh Tú Atus**	
3	2	"Ngạo nghễ" [Arrogant] (Anh Tú Atus, HURRYKNG, Rhyder, Kado)		HURRYKNG	
3	2	"Ngạo nghễ" [Arrogant] (Anh Tú Atus, HURRYKNG, Rhyder, Kado)		Rhyder	
4	1	"Sao hạng A" [A-list star] (HIEUTHUHAI, Dương Domic, Kewtiie)		Song Luân	
4	1	"Sao hạng A" [A-list star] (HIEUTHUHAI, Dương Domic, Kewtiie)		JSOL	
4	1	"Sao hạng A" [A-list star] (HIEUTHUHAI, Dương Domic, Kewtiie)		**HIEUTHUHAI**	
4	1	"Sao hạng A" [A-list star] (HIEUTHUHAI, Dương Domic, Kewtiie)		Dương Domic	
Guest performances (Live TV broadcasting)
Order	Song(s) (Author)			Performer(s)	
1	"Ngáo ngơ" – "Love sand" – "Catch me if you can" – "Đầu đội sừng" – "Walk" – "I'm thinking about you" [Mindless - Love Sand - Catch me if you can - Horns on head - Walk - I'm thinking about you]			Oh Dance Team	
2	"Mình anh thôi" [Only me] (Negav, Kado)			Negav	
3	"Laviu" (August (Fillinus), Graykee (Fillinus), Dreamble, WEAN, HURRYKNG, Hùng Huỳnh, Dương Domic)			Erik, WEAN, HURRYKNG, Hùng Huỳnh, Dương Domic	
4	"The Stars" (JustaTee, Darrys, DBaola, Machiot, Minsicko, 52Hz, Pháo)			Liz Kim Cương, Mỹ Mỹ, Juky San, 52Hz, Pháo	

- Contestant is the team leader for the performance.
