= Rhyder =

RHYDER
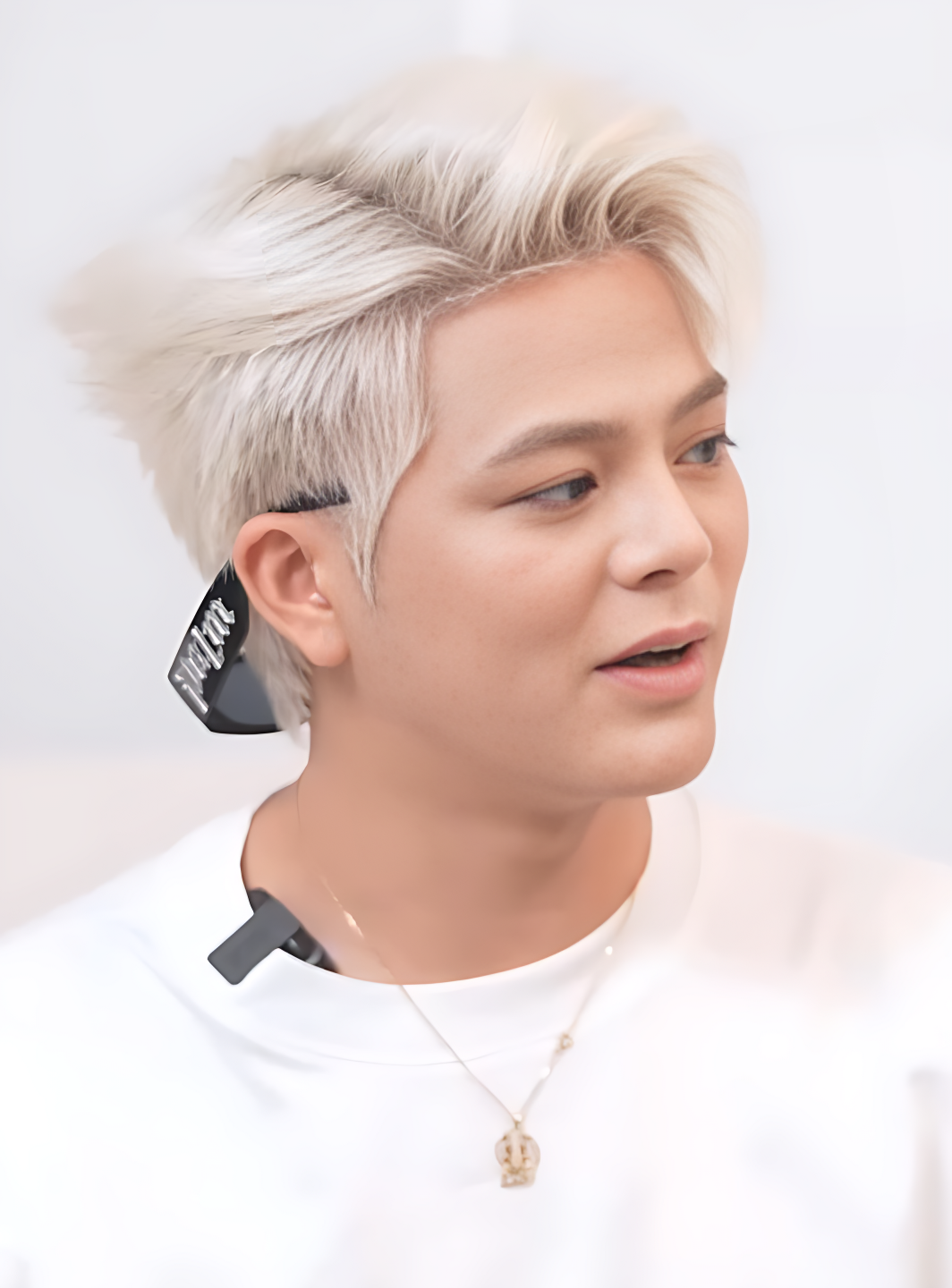
- Rhyder in 2023
- Born: Nguyễn Quang Anh; March 18, 2001 (age 25); Thanh Hóa, Vietnam
- Education: Vietnam National Academy of Music
- Occupations: Singer-songwriter; Rapper; Record producer
- Years active: 2013–present
- Height: 1.70 m (5 ft 7 in)
- Parents: Nguyễn Văn Tâm (father); Lê Thị Nghĩa (mother)
- Relatives: Nguyễn Quang Thắng (brother); Đinh Thị Biềng (maternal grandmother)
- Awards: List
- Musical career
- Origin: Ho Chi Minh City, Vietnam
- Genres: V-pop; hip hop; dance-pop; R&B; ballad
- Instruments: Vocals; synth; organ; guitar; drums
- Label: DG House

Thanh Hóa (city)

Nguyễn Quang Anh (born March 18, 2001), commonly known by his stage name Rhyder (stylized in all caps) or Quang Anh Rhyder, is a Vietnamese singer-songwriter, rapper, and record producer. Rising to fame after winning the reality competition The Voice Kids of Vietnam in 2013, he began his musical career as a singer. Despite his young age at the time, he was highly regarded by critics and audiences alike for his vocal ability, musicality, and engaging performance style.

A long time later, Quang Anh changed his stage name to Rhyder and regained public attention when he participated in the third season of the competition Rap Viet in 2023. At the end of that year, he released the single "Chịu cách mình nói thua" (Accepting Defeat), which achieved significant commercial success. In 2024, he continued to make his mark as the runner-up on the first season of the show Anh trai "say hi", while also earning a spot in the final five-member winning lineup.

== Early life ==
Rhyder was born Nguyễn Quang Anh on March 18, 2001, in Thanh Hóa to a family facing significant financial hardships. His father, Nguyễn Văn Tâm, was a tour driver, while his mother, Lê Thị Nghĩa, and older brother, Nguyễn Quang Thắng, were both performers in the Thanh Hóa provincial chèo troupe. Inheriting a passion for the arts from his mother and brother early on, Quang Anh was able to sing karaoke at the age of 3, even though he was still illiterate. When he was 4 or 5 years old, his parents divorced due to marital conflicts, after which his mother had to work as a grocery seller and then a sanitation worker to make a living and raise the two brothers.

While other family members pursued traditional arts, Quang Anh was particularly interested in upbeat genres like rock and dance; he also loved dancing and acrobatics to the thumping music whenever it played. During his school years, he also competed for his school's soccer team, which won a city-level award. In 2011, Quang Anh was diagnosed with meningitis and had to undergo hospital treatment for a period of time. Around this same time, the Thanh Hóa Radio and Television Station organized the 8th City-wide Red Flamboyant Singing Festival. Despite having only recovered for about two months and still being in weak health, he hid it from his family to participate in the competition and ultimately won first prize with the performance "Lý kéo chài." From then on, he began participating more in local cultural and artistic activities, and also acted in several television skits.

Due to his family's tight financial situation, Quang Anh did not have many opportunities for formal music education. Most of his singing was self-taught through television, tapes, and the Internet, as well as guidance from his older brother. It wasn't until he began participating in the Giọng hát Việt nhí (The Voice Kids Vietnam) competition that his mother asked a vocal teacher, Phạm Hoàng Hiền, to teach him a few songs for the contest.

== Career ==
=== 2013–2018: The Voice Kids and rise to fame ===
In 2013, while attending 6th grade at Ly Tu Trong Middle School (Thanh Hoa City), Nguyen Quang Anh registered to participate in the television program The Voice Kids during its very first season. Upon learning about the competition, he tried to convince his mother to let him audition, but was initially refused due to their difficult family circumstances. However, faced with her son's determination and passion for music, she borrowed money from neighbors to arrange for the two brothers to go to Hanoi for the preliminary round. There, he performed the song "Rock vầng trăng" (Rocking the Moon) in front of musician Phuong Uyen and was immediately moved to the next round. After passing an additional audition with the band, he was selected to participate in the official filming in Ho Chi Minh City.

Entering the Blind Auditions, Quang Anh performed the song "Đám cưới chuột" (The Rats' Wedding), playing to his strengths and impressing with his powerful vocals and performance technique. This performance received votes from all four coaches, and he decided to join the team of coaches Hồ Hoài Anh and Lưu Hương Giang. Later in the Battle round, he was grouped with Bach Phuc Nguyen and Do Tri Dung for a performance of the song "Come Together," and became the only one chosen to move forward from the group. Throughout the live shows, Quang Anh continued to attract attention and widespread support from the audience as he constantly demonstrated his versatility across various musical styles with a series of works such as "Chiếc khăn Piêu," "Sắc màu," "Thềnh thềnh oong ơi," and "Đá trông chồng." With 215,903 votes from the audience in the finale, he surpassed two opponents, Phương Mỹ Chi and Tran Ngoc Duy, to claim the championship title of the program, although his victory immediately sparked a wave of conflicting debate. The entire 500 million VND prize he won from the competition was dedicated to renovating his family's home as well as for his future studies. Immediately after The Voice Kids, Quang Anh signed an official contract to become an exclusive singer for Cát Tiên Sa, the organizer and producer of the show.

Returning to his hometown after the competition, Quang Anh continued his studies at school and received many invitations to perform at various large and small venues. To avoid affecting his studies, his family only allowed him to perform on weekends. In September and October 2013, to show gratitude to the audience, Quang Anh participated in a series of charity programs such as "Học đường tươi sáng" (Bright School), "Vì ngày mai tươi sáng" (For a Bright Tomorrow), and "Vì một Việt Nam khỏe mạnh" (For a Healthy Vietnam). In January 2014, Quang Anh was a guest in singer Đan Trường's Liveshow "Vẫn Mãi Một Nụ cười" (Forever a Smile).

During the 2013 Mai Vàng Awards, Quang Anh was nominated in the top 5 of the "Male Light Music Singer" category, ranking just behind the winner Noo Phước Thịnh. Nevertheless, the organizers decided to grant him a special award to encourage the male singer to develop his musical talent in the future. Additionally, he was included in the list of the 10 most popular singers of the year for this award.

In April 2014, Quang Anh had his first overseas tour in Australia—along with artists Hoài Linh, Chí Tài, Trường Giang, and Hoài Lâm—and performed a duet with singer Bằng Kiều on the song "Sắc Màu". In October 2014, Quang Anh was a guest in the Finale of The Voice Kids 2014 and performed the song "Đồ chơi đất" by musician Luu Thien Huong. In November 2014, Quang Anh appeared in Liveshow 5 of the program Cặp đôi hoàn hảo (The Perfect Couple), supporting the duo Duong Hoang Yen and Ha Duy with the medley "Quê nhà – Gặp mẹ trong mơ." In December 2014, Quang Anh participated in the The Voice Kids 2014 gala night, a performance gathering prominent contestants from both seasons of the show.

In June 2014, under the guidance of Ho Hoai Anh and Luu Huong Giang, Quang Anh auditioned and was admitted to the Intermediate Jazz percussion class at the Vietnam National Academy of Music with a very high score. He and his mother moved to Hanoi to facilitate his living and studying at the school.

=== 2018–2024: Operating under a new stage name and returning with Rap Viet ===
In late 2018, nearly six years after winning The Voice Kids Vietnam, Quang Anh released his first musical product titled "Anh quen với cô đơn" (I'm used to being lonely), which he composed himself. Performed with electronic dance music (EDM) elements that fit the trends of the time, the song achieved moderate impact and viewership despite not being widely promoted. Along with the appearance of "Anh quen với cô đơn," he also decided to adopt the new stage name Quang Anh Rhyder and revealed many changes in his image and personal style. Regarding the choice of the stage name Rhyder, the male singer shared that the name is a combination of the stage names of rapper Rhymastic and singer-songwriter Justin Bieber, carrying the meaning of a "warrior." Following that in March 2019, Quang Anh collaborated with female singer Kiều Phạm for her new song "Yêu thương nhạt màu" (Faded Love), in which he contributed vocals as a rapper for the first time.

In early 2021, after completing his studies at the Vietnam National Academy of Music, Rhyder moved to Ho Chi Minh City to develop his career. He and some friends founded the group DaGoats House (DG House) – a rap group consisting mainly of members born in the Year of the Goat 2003 – and released several products with the group. He also participated in several music television programs such as Cùng hát lên nào or The Best Song, but none achieved much success. Continuously releasing new works without attracting attention from the general public during this time made Quang Anh struggle to regain his fame, and at times he fell into a state of deadlock. He once expressed his intention to return to his hometown to do business, but ultimately chose to stay in the city to persevere with his profession.

In mid-2023, Rhyder surprised the media by appearing in the third season of Rap Viet, a talent search competition for the rap genre. He had known about the program two years prior and had signed up for the second season but did not pass the preliminary round. Entering the competition, he chose the FB Boiz composition "Để em rời xa" (To let you go) to develop into the song "Để anh một mình" (Leave me alone) for his performance in the audition round, blending melodic rap and R&B. With his vocal advantage, he took on both the lead vocals and the rap parts in the work without needing a supporting singer. This performance received selections from all four coaches, including Andree Right Hand, whose team he decided to join. Despite showing good hook-singing and composing abilities, in the early stages, Rhyder faced considerable doubt and controversy regarding his heavy focus on singing in a show that required rap expertise – an issue pointed out by coach Thai VG during his face-off round performance. His declared victory over opponent Dubbie in this round further fueled the controversy, as a contestant who barely rapped could still advance deep into a competition like Rap Viet. It was only when he moved to the breakthrough round that he showcased more of his rapping ability through the song "Từ chối hiểu" (Refuse to understand) with a drum performance integrated into the act. Despite debates about borrowing melodies from South Korean rapper Ash Island, Quang Anh still won a spot in the final with 3 out of 7 votes, surpassing opponents Long Nón Lá, Ogenus, and Captain in the group. In the final night, he brought the rap track "Ánh đèn sân khấu 2" (Stage Lights 2) in collaboration with coach Andree Right Hand, marking the first time he performed a full rap throughout the entire act. Although he could not finish the competition in the overall top 3, Rhyder left a strong impression with performances that went viral on social media, contributing to his name shining bright again and becoming a promising factor after the show.

Coming out of Rap Viet, Quang Anh Rhyder took time to perfect and release the single "Chịu cách mình nói thua" (Accepting the way we lose) in late November 2023, collaborating with two rappers CoolKid and Ban. After five days of release, the music video (MV) of the song took the top spot on YouTube's trending music chart with over 2 million views, making him the first contestant after the end of Rap Viet 2023 to have a product reach No. 1 on YouTube trending. In early 2024, he reunited with his mentor from the competition, Andree Right Hand, in the new song "Dân chơi sao phải khóc" (Why should players cry), continuing to create another success by attracting 3.7 million views after more than a week on YouTube along with the number one position on the platform's music trending tab.

=== 2024–present: Anh trai "say hi" and debut album ===
In 2024, Rhyder was one of 30 male artists participating in the Anh trai "say hi" first season and finished as the runner-up, earning a spot in the winning group lineup named Anh trai "Best 5" alongside Isaac, Đức Phúc, Quang Hùng MasterD, and HIEUTHUHAI. At the end of November 2024, Rhyder held his first solo minishow in Ho Chi Minh City titled Secret Project, while also serving as the music director for the performance itself.

On October 16, 2025, Rhyder released the first studio album of his career titled Trap, featuring 10 tracks in R&B, pop, and trap styles.

On March 18, 2026, on the occasion of his 25th birthday, Rhyder released the song "Anh sẽ về" (I Will Return) as a tribute to his fan community, known as Flash. Along with that, he planned to hold the first major concert of his career titled Luminarhy, taking place on April 4 in Ho Chi Minh City.

== Commercial Partnerships ==
- October 2013: Joined Lifebuoy's "Clean Hands Squad" along with Thu Ha, Ton Chi Long, Hong Khanh, and Phuc Nguyen, traveling across various regions of Vietnam to promote handwashing with soap for children.
- April 2014: Joined P/S's "Little Dentist Squad" along with Do Nhat Nam.

== Discography ==
=== Studio albums ===
- Trap (2025)

=== Extended plays (EPs) ===
- Chẳng có nhau (2022)

=== Singles ===
==== As lead artist ====
Year	Title	Album	Ref.
2018	"Anh quen với cô đơn"	Non-album singles	
2019	"Em là ai"	Non-album singles	
2019	"Vỡ tan" (ft. Mai Chí Công)	Non-album singles	
2020	"Chẳng thể nói nên lời"	Non-album singles	
2020	"Em đang làm gì đấy"	Non-album singles	
2020	"Chia sẻ lên" (with Kaypi, $u, Tonix, Allen)	Non-album singles	
2021	"Chúng sinh"	Non-album singles	
2021	"Người có nhớ anh không?"	Non-album singles	
2021	"Yêu anh đi"	Non-album singles	
2021	"Chợt tỉnh giấc"	Non-album singles	
2021	"Làm sao có thể quên một người"	Non-album singles	
2021	"Chiếc khăn Feel"	Non-album singles	
2022	"Mưa nắng hạ"	Non-album singles	
2023	"Để anh một mình"	In Rap Việt 2023	
2023	"Cậu ấm, cô chén" (with Dubbie)	In Rap Việt 2023	
2023	"Từ chối hiểu"	In Rap Việt 2023	
2023	"Anh không xứng"	In Rap Việt 2023	
2023	"Da Money Team (Ánh đèn sân khấu 2)" (with Andree Right Hand, Evy)	In Rap Việt 2023	
2023	"Sau cơn mưa" (with CoolKid)	Non-album singles	
2023	"Chịu cách mình nói thua" (ft. Ban, CoolKid)	Non-album singles	
2024	"Tết đến"	Non-album singles	
2024	"The Stars" (with 30 contestants)	In Anh trai "say hi" 2024	
2024	"Bảnh" (with Alliance 2)	In Anh trai "say hi" 2024	
2024	"No Far No Star" (with Song Luân, Đỗ Phú Quí, Tage, HURRYKNG, Captain Boy)	In Anh trai "say hi" 2024	
2024	"Hào quang" (with Dương Domic, Pháp Kiều)	In Anh trai "say hi" 2024	
2024	"I'm Thinking About You" (with Đức Phúc, WEAN, Hùng Huỳnh ft. tlinh)	In Anh trai "say hi" 2024	
2024	"Chân thành" (with Quang Hùng MasterD, WEAN, Ali Hoàng Dương, Captain Boy)	In Anh trai "say hi" 2024	
2024	"SOS" (with Quang Hùng MasterD, WEAN, Ali Hoàng Dương, Captain Boy)	In Anh trai "say hi" 2024	
2024	"Anh biết rồi"	In Anh trai "say hi" 2024	
2024	"Ngạo nghễ" (with Isaac, Anh Tú Atus, HURRYKNG)	In Anh trai "say hi" 2024	
2024	"Say Hi Never Say Goodbye" (with 30 contestants)	In Anh trai "say hi" 2024	
2025	"Diều ngược gió (The Future Is Now)" (with 52Hz, Phương Mỹ Chi, Captain Boy)	Non-album singles	
2025	"Đến là đón" (with Tage)	WeChoice Awards 2024	
2025	"Sau cơn suy"	Trap	
2026	"Sau đôi mắt cười" (with Hòa Minzy)	Non-album singles	
2026	"Anh sẽ về"	Non-album singles	

==== As featured artist ====
Year	Title	Ref.
2019	"Yêu thương nhạt màu" (Kiều Phạm ft. Quang Anh Rhyder)	
2024	"Dân chơi sao phải khóc" (Andree Right Hand ft. Rhyder, Wokeup)	
2024	"Ừ thì chia tay" (Captain Boy ft. Rhyder)	
2024	"Nỗi đau đính kèm" (Anh Tú Atus ft. Rhyder)	
2025	"Vui đét" (CoolKid, DuyB, Trix ft. Rhyder, Ban)	
2025	"Quá khứ kia của anh" (Wokeup ft. Andree Right Hand, Rhyder, CoolKid, Young Ban)	

==== Promotional songs ====
Year	Title	Brand	Ref.
2024	"Siêu nhân không biết bay" (with Mỹ Linh)	P/S	
2024	"Lối riêng"	Kixx	
2025	"Sống là phải động" (with Anh Tú Atus)	Oppo	
2025	"Bay không cần cánh"	Rhys Man	

== Filmography ==
=== Films ===
Year	Title	Genre	Ref.
2025	Anh trai "say hi": The villain who creates the hero	Documentary	
2025	Anh trai "say hi": The day we didn't know names yet	Documentary	

=== Television shows ===
Year	Show	Role	Channel	Ref.
2013	The Voice Kids Vietnam	Contestant	VTV3	
2014	The Voice Kids Vietnam	Guest performer	VTV3	
2014	Just the Two of Us	Guest performer	VTV3	
2014–2015	Bữa trưa vui vẻ (Happy Lunch)	Guest	VTV6	
2019–2020	Tôi tuổi teen (I'm a Teen)	Guest	HTV7	
2020	Ẩm thực kỳ thú (Amazing Cuisine)	Guest	VTV3	
2022	Sing My Song – Casting Round	Contestant	YouTube	
2023	Rap Việt	Contestant	HTV2	
2024	Anh trai "say hi"	Contestant	HTV2	
2024	Our Song Vietnam	Guest	VTV3	
2025	Tổ đội "1 không 2" (One of a Kind Squad)	Guest	HTV7	
2025	Cuộc hẹn cuối tuần (Weekend Appointment)	Guest	VTV3	
2025	Đấu trường gia tốc (Acceleration Arena)	Main player	HTV7	
2025	V Concert – Rạng rỡ Việt Nam (Radiant Vietnam)	Performer	VTV3	
2025	V Fest – Vietnam Today	Performer	VTV3	
2025	Anh trai "say hi"	Guest performer	HTV2	
2026	Hoa xuân ca (Spring Flower Song)	Performer	VTV1	
2026	Sóng 26	Performer	HTV2	
2026	Chiến sĩ - Đường tới vinh quang (Soldier - Road to Glory)	Captain	VTV3	

== Awards and honors ==
=== Awards ===
Year	Award	Category	Nominee	Result	Ref.
2013	Zing Music Awards	Most Popular New Artist	Himself	Nominated	
2013	Mai Vang Awards	Top 10 Most Popular Singers	Himself	Won	
2013	Mai Vang Awards	Male Pop Singer	Himself	Nominated	
2013	Mai Vang Awards	Special Mai Vang Award	Himself	Won	
2023	WeChoice Awards	Rising Artist	Himself	Nominated	
2023	Lan Song Xanh	Best New Face	Himself	Nominated	
2024	Male Icon Awards	Best New Music Artist of the Year	Himself	Won	
2024	VTV Impressions	Impressive Young Face (Arts category)	Himself	Won	
2024	Mai Vang Awards	Male Singer and Rapper	Himself	Nominated	
2024	Mai Vang Awards	Song	"Hào quang"	Nominated	
2024	Lan Song Xanh	Top 10 Most Popular Songs	"Hào quang"	Won	
2024	Lan Song Xanh	Best Collaboration	"Hào quang"	Nominated	
2024	Lan Song Xanh	Breakthrough Singer	Himself	Nominated	
2024	WeChoice Awards	Inspirational Figure	Himself	Won	
2024	WeChoice Awards	Singer/Rapper with Breakthrough Activities	Himself	Nominated	
2024	WeChoice Awards	Explosive Performance	"I'm Thinking About You"	Nominated	
2024	WeChoice Awards	BFF – Best Fandom Forever	Flash	Nominated	
2024	Ngoi Sao Xanh	Best Music Video	"Chịu cách mình nói thua"	Nominated	
2025	Harper's Bazaar Star Awards	Rising Star of the Year (Rap)	Himself	Won	
2025	Male Icon Awards	Emerging Icon of the Year	Himself	Won	
2025	Van Xuan Awards	Impressive Advertising Ambassador of the Year	Himself	Nominated	
2025	Van Xuan Awards	Impressive Young Advertising Ambassador of the Year	Himself	Won	
2025	WeYoung	Best Fandom Forever	Flash	Nominated	
2025	Ngoi Sao Xanh	Best Music Video	"Tiếc cho em"	Nominated	
2025	Ngoi Sao Xanh	Most Popular Music Video	"Tiếc cho em"	Won	
2025	Lan Song Xanh	Most Popular Male Singer/Rapper	Himself	Nominated	
2025	Producer Inside Picks & Awards	Male Singer of the Year	Himself	Nominated	
2025	Producer Inside Picks & Awards	New Artist of the Year	Himself	Nominated	
2025	WeChoice Awards	Most Popular Singer/Rapper	Himself	Nominated	

=== Achievements ===
- First Prize at the Red Flamboyant Singing Festival of Thanh Hoa City in 2011.
- Winner of The Voice Kids Vietnam 2013.
- Top 9 of Rap Viet 2023.
- Runner-up and member of the "Best 5" group on Anh Trai "Say Hi" 2024.
