= Bảo Anh =

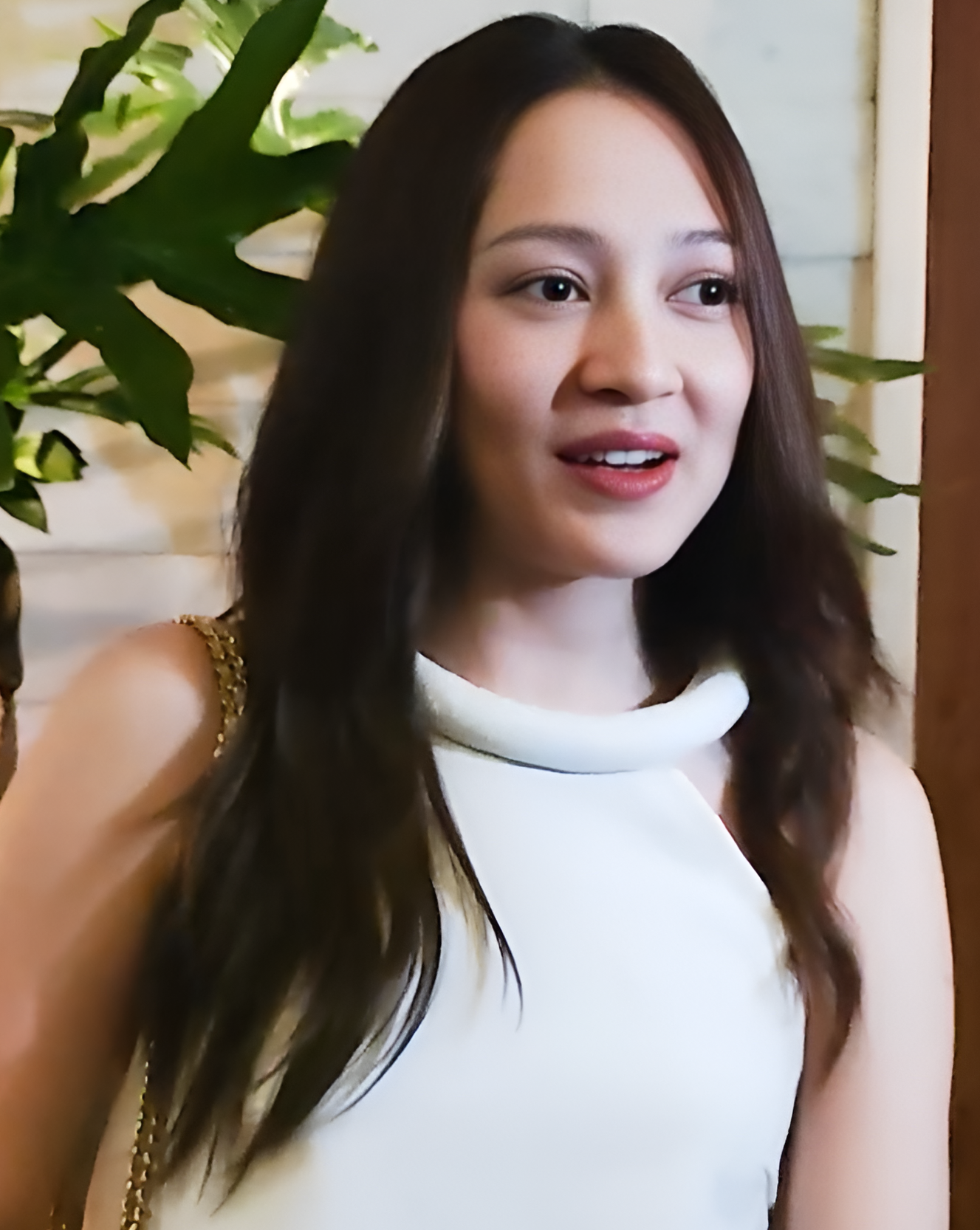
- Bảo Anh in 2023
- Born: Nguyễn Hoài Bảo Anh; September 3, 1992 (age 34); Ho Chi Minh City, Vietnam
- Occupations: Singer; Actor
- Musical career
- Genres: V-pop; ballad; R&B; EDM
- Instruments: Giọng hát; piano
- Years active: 2012–present

Nguyễn Hoài Bảo Anh (born September 3, 1992), better known by her stage name Bảo Anh, is a Vietnamese singer and actress. She first rose to prominence as a contestant on the singing competition show The Voice of Vietnam in 2012.

== Biography ==
Bảo Anh was born in Ho Chi Minh City into a family that faced many hardships. Moving from An Loc, Binh Phuoc (now Binh Long, Dong Nai), the whole family migrated to Ho Chi Minh City to start over from scratch, bringing with them their traditional chicken congee business in the old District 5.

In 2009, Bảo Anh tied for a prize with Văn Mai Hương at the "Tiếng ca học đường" competition with the song "Ăn khế trả vàng." Someone once commented on Bảo Anh's singing voice at the time as follows: "Nguyễn Hoài Bảo Anh sings with a lot of personality, an impressive bubbly quality, a characteristic 'teen' voice, and a fun, elegant aura. Her performance style is quite professional, and her outfit was both appropriate for the song and striking—she is, of course, sharp and beautiful. However, her vocals lack a warm, emotional touch and a lyrical feel in the melody. She needs to practice songs that are warm and soulful, with a slow but deep and lingering rhythm!"

In 2010, Bao Anh went on to win the Prospect Award at the H2T Icon 2010 competition organized by Hoa Hoc Tro Magazine. In 2012, she captured the hearts of both Thu Minh and rock singer Tran Lap on The Voice Vietnam with her clear and sweet vocals. Singer Ho Ngoc Ha even went as far as comparing Bao Anh to a Vietnamese Taylor Swift.

In addition to being a singer, Bảo Anh is also known for her acting roles in films such as Five Fairies in the House and Walking and Crying...

== Career ==
=== 2012–2013 ===
Bảo Anh joined The Voice Vietnam with the song "Safe and Sound" and impressed the coaches during the Blind Auditions; she chose to join musician Trần Lập's team and was eventually eliminated in the fifth Liveshow of the competition.

In 2013, Bao Anh competed in Dancing with the Stars and was eliminated in the 7th live show.

=== 2014–2015 ===
On January 23, 2014, Bao Anh released the music video for "Anh muon em song sao" (How do you want me to live). The song was composed by musician Chi Dan. The lyrics of "Anh muon em song sao" express the feelings of a girl facing heartbreak in love; happiness is not easy to find, yet I am still standing here waiting for you to come find me.

On July 11, 2014, Bảo Anh collaborated with male singer Hoàng Tôn to officially release the music video for "Mình yêu nhau bao lâu." The song features a deep and soulful ballad melody.

On September 29, 2014, the female singer released another ballad titled "Hay là mình chia tay" (Maybe We Should Break Up).

In 2015, Bảo Anh competed in the show The Remix alongside DJ Melo and producer Addy Trần, making it to the seventh live show.

That same year, in 2015, Bảo Anh released the song "Lần Đầu," a collaboration with the famous Hanoi rapper Mr.A. The track featured a dance/EDM style with a high-energy, catchy melody and choreography. Because she loved the song "Be My Lover" so much, she and her team paid to sample a portion of it for her own version of "Lần Đầu." This was a fresh experiment for the singer, and fortunately, it was very well received by the public.

On September 15, 2015, she performed during the semi-final night of the Miss Universe Vietnam pageant at the Crown Convention Center in Nha Trang, Khanh Hoa. This was her first time performing in a beauty pageant.

=== 2016 ===
2016 was considered a breakout year for Bao Anh when she released two music videos that both became instant hits, drawing massive audiences. The soundtrack "Trái Tim Em Cũng Biết Đau" (My Heart Can Feel Pain Too) racked up huge view counts on YouTube and went viral across social media. Following that success, the song "Yêu Một Người Vô Tâm" (Loving an Indifferent Person) achieved equally impressive results with massive streaming numbers on Zing MP3 and YouTube. Bao Anh transformed into a 90s-style vintage girl, delivering an emotional performance filled with the sorrow of a dead-end romance. It was after this release that fans began calling Bao Anh the "Queen of Tears."

=== 2017 ===
On the evening of April 7, 2017, Bao Anh held a press conference in Ho Chi Minh City to introduce her new music video, "In the Night." The video was officially released to the public later that same night. Known for her feminine image and signature ballads, this marked Bao Anh's first spectacular transformation in both style and sound. Experimenting with EDM, she sent fans into a frenzy with steamy scenes showcasing her curves and intimate moments on the beach with her co-star, Huu Vi.

On November 8, 2017, Bao Anh released the song "Sống Xa Anh Chẳng Dễ Dàng" (Living Without You Isn't Easy). Marking her third collaboration with the "King of Sad Music" Mr. Siro, Bao Anh captivated audiences, immersing them in the poignant, deep, and mournful melodies of a tragic love story separated by life and death. "Sống Xa Anh Chẳng Dễ Dàng" quickly garnered over 11 million streams just over a week after its release. Bao Anh had high expectations for this track, and it did not disappoint; the hit song took the charts by storm and touched the hearts of countless listeners.

=== 2018 ===
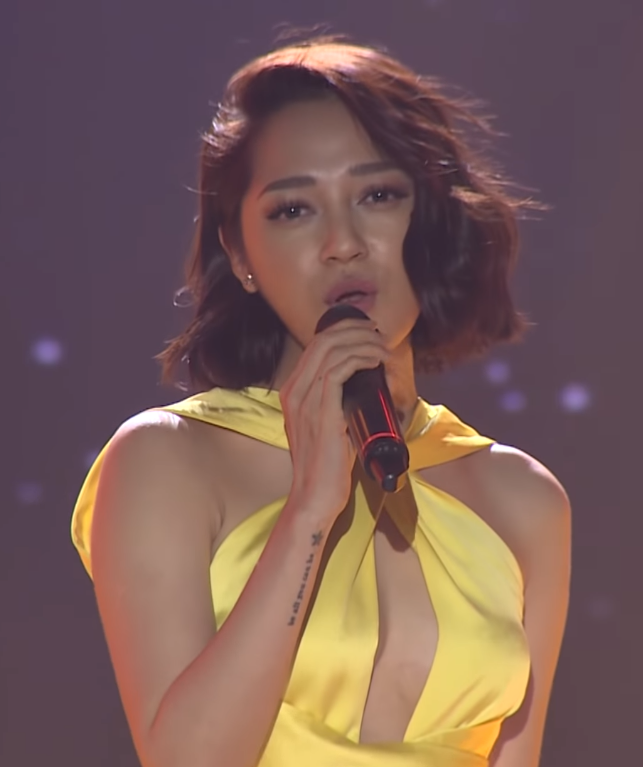
Bảo Anh at Gương Mặt Thân Quen 2018

On April 23, 2018, Bảo Anh released the song "Ai khóc nỗi đau này" as a one-shot music video. On May 4, 2018, the official music video for the song was released. Composed by Đức Trí, the song is a sad ballad with a deeply narrative feel, capturing the emotions of a young woman enduring the pain and bitterness of her love story.

On October 10, 2018, Bảo Anh officially released "Như lời đồn," composed by Khắc Hưng. The song is an upbeat, catchy Latin track, but its title drew criticism for being suggestive, as it easily brings to mind certain sensitive slang frequently used on social media.

=== 2019 ===
Nearly a year after the success of her hit "Như lời đồn," singer Bảo Anh is officially returning to the V-pop race with a new music video titled "Ai cần ai."

The project's title track was composed by Hứa Kim Tuyền—the songwriter behind hits like "Cầu hôn" and "Không ai hơn em đâu anh." With "Ai cần ai," Hứa Kim Tuyền and Bảo Anh bring a modern, youthful vibe to the music.

In addition to the meticulously produced audio, Bảo Anh teamed up with creative director Denis Đặng and director Đinh Hà Uyên Thư to create a music video with a unique storyline.

On the evening of September 19, 2019, Bảo Anh officially released "Ai Cần Ai," marking a bold turning point in her music career.

=== 2020 ===
After releasing "Ai cần ai," Bảo Anh has returned to the V-pop race with a new music video titled "Lười yêu."

The song was composed by Trang Pháp and Lục Huy. With "Lười yêu," Bảo Anh brings an upbeat vibe—giving the music a new, youthful feel.

=== 2023 ===
Bảo Anh joined the show Sisters Who Make Waves, but she withdrew from the program because she did not meet the criteria.

=== 2024 ===
The female singer appeared on Anh trai "say hi" as a guest in episodes 6 and 7.

=== 2025 ===
Bảo Anh joined the Season 1 of Em xinh "say hi".

== Discography ==
=== Studio albums ===
- Ballad Vol. 1 (2014)

=== Live albums ===
- Comeback Stage: The Live Album (From “Gala Nhạc Việt LIVE”) (2023)

=== Extended plays ===
- MoodShow (2021)
- MoodShow 1.2 (2021)
- MoodShow The 2nd Show (2021)
- MoodShow 3 (2022)
- không biết nên vui hay buồn (2023)

=== Singles ===
- Safe and Sound
- Và em đã biết mình yêu
- Một ngày em sẽ (hợp tác với Yanbi và Mr.T)
- Câu chuyện ngày mưa
- Con yêu mẹ
- Lần đầu (hợp tác với Mr.A)
- Leave me alone (song ca với Đông Nhi)
- Trái tim em cũng biết đau
- Yêu một người vô tâm
- Anh muốn em sống sao
- Mình yêu nhau bao lâu (hợp tác với Hoàng Tôn) [từ Ballad Vol. 1]
- Nhớ nhung (từ Ballad Vol. 1)
- Làm sao trốn tránh
- Bây giờ em hiểu (từ Ballad Vol. 1)
- Hay là mình chia tay (từ Ballad Vol. 1)
- Đón mùa xuân về
- In the night
- Thanh xuân của chúng ta (song ca với Bùi Anh Tuấn)
- Sống xa anh chẳng dễ dàng
- Ai khóc nỗi đau này
- Như lời đồn
- Ai cần ai
- Lười yêu (solo hoặc phiên bản dance hợp tác với Brittanya Karma)
- Giả vờ thôi (Phát hành lại)
- Xuân mang tết đến
- Ai khóc nỗi đau này
- Mắt nai cha cha cha (từ MoodShow The 2nd Show)
- Kathy Kathy (từ MoodShow The 2nd Show)
- Nếu phải xa nhau (từ MoodShow The 2nd Show)
- Miền cát trắng (từ MoodShow The 2nd Show)
- Trưa vắng (từ (từ MoodShow The 2nd Show)
- Một thời đã xa (từ MoodShow The 2nd Show)
- Yêu không cần ép
- Mộng chiều xuân
- Hôm nay tôi buồn (Nhạc phim "Bẫy ngọt ngào")
- Từng là của nhau (hợp tác với Táo)
- Cô ấy của anh ấy (từ không biết nên vui hay buồn)
- 20 25 30 (từ không biết nên vui hay buồn)
- Người yêu anh nhất (Prod.by Châu Đăng Khoa)

== Controversy ==
The music video for "Như lời đồn" sparked a lot of controversy right upon its release. Specifically, the song's title was being spoonerized into sensitive language, leading Bảo Anh to leave a comment under the video warning viewers: "I'm asking young people to stop playing with the song's title in any form." Additionally, the music video contains several offensive and inappropriate scenes.

== TV shows ==
Year	Title	Role	Cùng	Network
2012	Giọng hát Việt (mùa 1)	Thí sinh		VTV3
2013	Bước nhảy hoàn vũ Mùa 4	Thí sinh	Atanas Malamov	VTV3
2014	2 !dol	Khách mời		Yeah1TV
2014	Alo Alo	Khách mời		Yeah1TV
2014	Lần đầu tôi kể	Khách mời		HTV2
2014	Ai dám hát	Người chơi	Quang Đăng	HTV7
2014	Ai thông minh hơn học sinh lớp 5	Người chơi		VTV6
2015	The Remix – Hòa âm Ánh sáng (mùa 1)	Thí sinh	Addy Trần, DJ Melo	VTV3
2015	Tạp chí Showbiz (Số 13)	Khách mời		Yeah1 Family
2015	Danh hài Đất Việt (Tập 2)	Diễn viên		THVL1
2015	Hoa hậu Hoàn vũ Việt Nam (Bán kết)	Ca sĩ khách mời		
2016
2016	Radio 88.8 (Tập 5)	Khách mời		YanTV
2016	Giọng ải giọng ai (Mùa 1 – Tập 10)	Khách mời	Trấn Thành, Thu Trang	HTV7
2016	Bữa trưa vui vẻ (26/8)	Khách mời		VTV6
2017	Ca sĩ giấu mặt (mùa 3) (Tập 5, Bán kết 1 – Tập 16)	Ca sĩ chính		THVL1
2017	Người bí ẩn (Mùa 4 – Tập 11)	Người chơi	Hồ Quang Hiếu	HTV7
2017	Hát mãi ước mơ (Mùa 1 – Tập 8)	Khách mời		HTV7
2017	Remix New Generation – Hòa âm Ánh sáng (mùa 3) (Tập 12)	Ca sĩ khách mời		VTV3
2018	Chuyện tối nay với Thành (Tập 23)	Khách mời		BRT
2018	Giọng hát Việt nhí (mùa 6)	Huấn luyện viên	Khắc Hưng	VTV3
2019	Sóng xuân 19	Khách mời		HTV2
2019	Studio H9 – Hẹn cuối tuần (Mùa 2 – Tập 21)	Khách mời		HTV7
2019	Người ấy là ai (Mùa 2 – Tập 15, Tập 16)	Khách mời		HTV2
2020	Người ấy là ai (Mùa 3 – Tập 4)	Khách mời		HTV2
2020	Giọng ải giọng ai (Mùa 5 – Tập 12)	Khách mời	Trấn Thành, Diệp Lâm Anh	HTV7
2022	Street Dance Việt Nam - Đây Chính Là Nhảy Đường Phố	Đội trưởng	Chi Pu, Trọng Hiếu, Kay Trần	HTV7
2023	La cà hát ca (Mùa 1 – Tập 1, Tập 2)	Khách mời	Ngô Kiến Huy, Jun Phạm, Trung Quân, Blacka, Myra Trần	HTV7
2023	Chị đẹp đạp gió rẽ sóng	Contestant (Withdraw)		VTV3
2024	Anh trai "say hi"	Guest		HTV2
2024	<i id="mwAnE">2 ngày 1 đêm</i> (Mùa Lễ hội – Tập 71, Tập 72)	Khách mời	Hà Nhi và dàn cast	HTV7
2025	Em xinh "say hi"	Contestant		HTV2

== Filmography ==
Year	Film	Role	Note	Tham khảo
2013	Nhà có 5 nàng tiên	Tiên Hương	Phim điện ảnh	"Bảo Anh – Nhà có 5 nàng tiên".
2014	Vừa đi vừa khóc	Bảo Quyên	Phim truyền hình	Lương Mạnh Hải cõng Bảo Anh dưới mưa
2014	Chàng trai năm ấy	Chính mình	Vai khách mời	
2022	Bẫy ngọt ngào	Camy	Phim điện ảnh	

== Awards and nominations ==
=== Awards ===
Year	Award	Category	Nomination	Result	TK.
2014	Làn Sóng Xanh	Nữ ca sĩ triển vọng	Bản thân	Nominated	
2016	Làn Sóng Xanh	Gương mặt triển vọng (Nữ)	Bản thân	Won	
2016	POPS Awards	Video ca nhạc của năm	"Trái tim em cũng biết đau"	Won	
2018	Keeng Young Awards	Ca sĩ của năm	Bản thân	Nominated	
2018	Keeng Young Awards	Bài hát của năm	"Như lời đồn"	Nominated	
2018	Keeng Young Awards	MV của năm	"Như lời đồn"	Nominated	
2018	Keeng Young Awards	Ca khúc nhạc Dance	"Như lời đồn"	Nominated	
2018	Keeng Young Awards	Nữ ca sĩ được yêu thích nhất	Bản thân	Nominated	
2018	Keeng Young Awards	Top 3 ca sĩ có bản nhạc chờ được yêu thích nhất	Bản thân	Won	
2022	MTV Fan Choice	Nghệ sĩ được yêu thích nhất	Bản thân	Nominated	
2022	MTV Fan Choice	Sản phẩm âm nhạc được yêu thích nhất	"Yêu không cần ép"	Nominated	
2023	Làn Sóng Xanh	Ca sĩ đột phá	Bản thân	Nominated	
