= Hieuthuhai =

HIEUTHUHAI
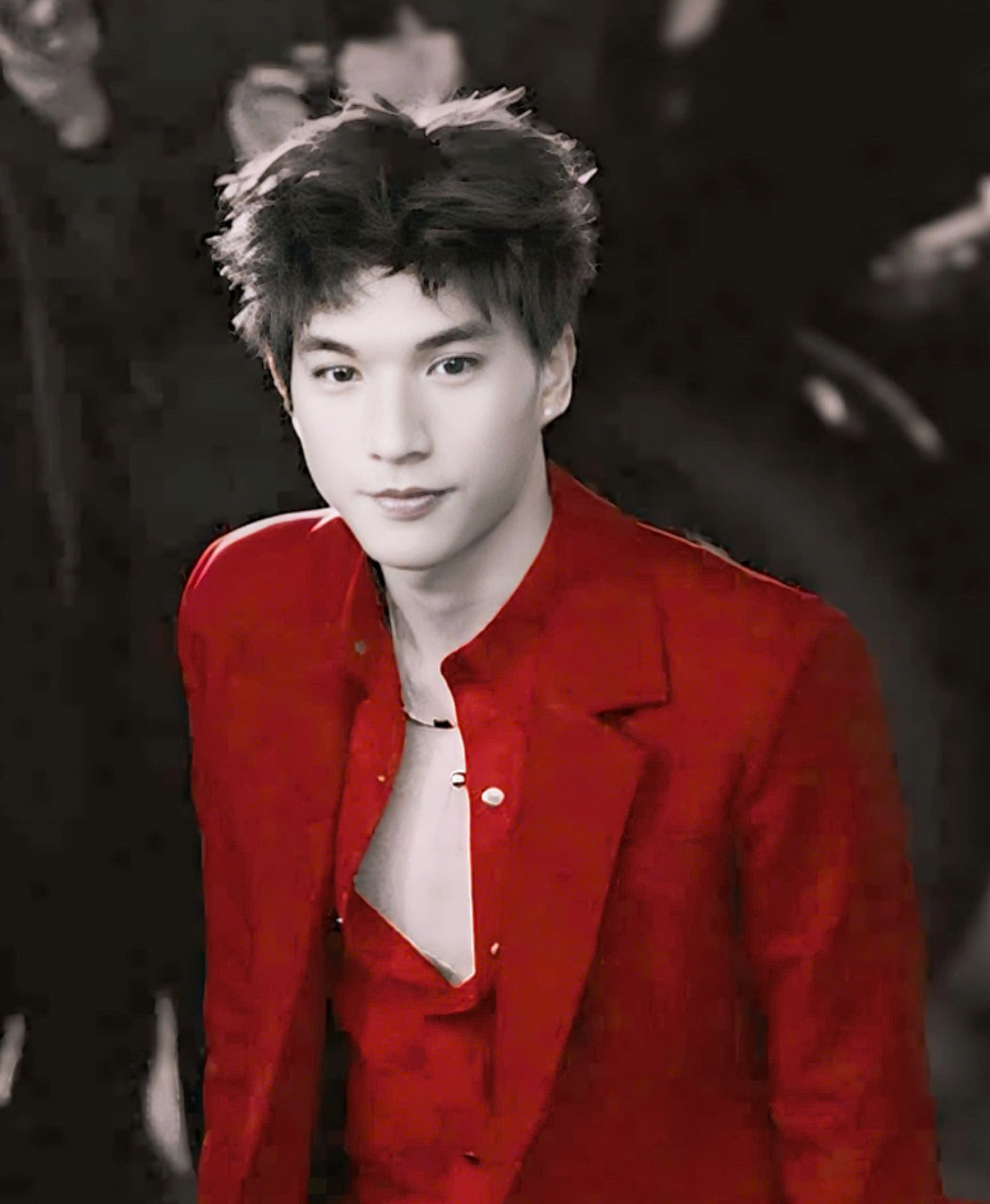
- HIEUTHUHAI in 2023

Background information
- Born: 28 September 1999 (age 26); Ho Chi Minh City, Vietnam
- Genres: Hip hop; pop; R&B
- Occupations: Rapper; singer-songwriter
- Years active: 2018–present

Trần Minh Hiếu (born 28 September 1999), known professionally as Hieuthuhai; stylized in all caps), is a Vietnamese rapper, singer-songwriter, and television personality. He is a member of the music collective GERDNANG.

He gained national recognition after competing in the first season of King of Rap (2020), finishing in the Top 5. Since 2022, he has been a regular cast member of the variety show 2 Days 1 Night. In 2024, he won the reality competition Anh trai "say hi" and received the "Most Popular Team Leader" award. He was also nominated for Breakthrough Singer at the Green Wave Awards in 2022.

== Career ==
=== 2020–2021: Early career ===
HIEUTHUHAI began his music career in 2018 but rose to prominence through King of Rap in 2020. Before joining the show, he was mainly familiar with lighter pop genres and had only begun exploring rap around 2018.

During King of Rap, he was voted "Most Popular Contestant" and finished among the Top 5 finalists. His performances of "Chơi" and "Bật nhạc lên" (featuring Harmonie) drew wide attention. His pre-existing single "Cua" was also featured on the show and became the only performance from King of Rap to enter YouTube Vietnam's Top 10 Trending and Top 50 Most Popular Songs at the time.

=== 2022–present: Mainstream success ===
In 2022, HIEUTHUHAI released three singles: “Dynamic Duo,” “Vệ tinh” (featuring Hoàng Tôn), and "Ngủ một mình."

He was nominated for Breakthrough Artist at the Green Wave Awards and New Artist of the Year at the Cống hiến Awards.

That year, he confirmed work on his debut studio album Ai cũng phải bắt đầu từ đâu đó ("Everyone Has to Start Somewhere"), which was described as a nine-track project inspired by his personal experiences.

HIEUTHUHAI later joined an entertainment agency and began appearing in television programs, most notably 2 Days 1 Night.

In 2023, he made his acting debut in episode 4 of the web series Chủ tịch giao hàng, directed by Trường Giang.

In 2024, HIEUTHUHAI joined Anh trai "say hi" as one of 30 contestants. He was crowned the season champion and co-founded a temporary boy group with Rhyder, Đức Phúc, Quang Hùng MasterD, and Isaac. He also received the "Most Favorite Team Leader" award with 20 out of 30 votes.

That same year, he served as a guest judge on Rap Việt (season 4).

== Filmography ==
=== Film ===
Year	Title	Role	Notes	Ref.
2025	Anh Trai "Say Hi": Kẻ Phản Diện Tạo Nên Người Hùng	Himself	Documentary film	

=== Television shows ===
Year	Title	Role	Notes	Ref.
2020	King of Rap	Himself		
2022	2 Days 1 Night	Himself		
2024	Anh trai "say hi"	Himself		
2024	Rap Việt	Himself (guest judge)	Season 4	
