= Erik (Vietnamese singer) =

Vietnamese singer, dancer, and actor (born 1997)

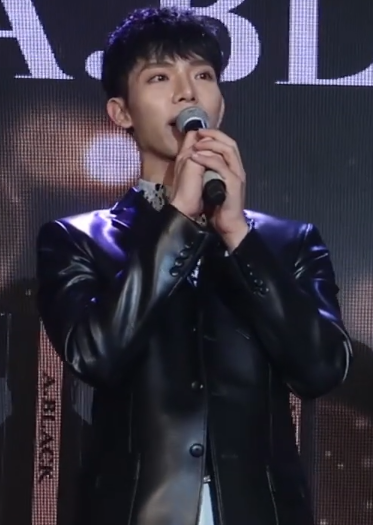

Background information
- Born: Lê Trung Thành; October 13, 1997 (age 28); Hanoi, Vietnam
- Genres: Pop, ballad, dance pop
- Occupations: Singer, dancer, actor
- Years active: 2015-present
- Label: V-MAS (2018–present)

Lê Trung Thành (born October 13, 1997), known by his stage name Erik, is a Vietnamese singer and dancer. He first gained recognition competing The Voice Kids of Vietnam in 2013, in addition to having been part in 2016 of the Vietnamese boy group Monstar.

== Life and career ==
=== 1997–2015: Childhood and The Voice Kids of Vietnam ===
Erik was born on October 13, 1997, in Hanoi. At first, his family opposed Erik becoming an artist, but eventually agreed to allow Erik to pursue his music career if he passed the blind auditions on The Voice Kids of Vietnam in 2013. He managed to pass the round, and joined coach Hiền Thục. Erik later finished 15th place on the program. In addition to his participation in The Voice Kids of Vietnam, Erik also participated in a number of other music competitions and received encouraging achievements.

In January 2015, Erik participated in St.319 Entertainment's internship contest and was officially selected to be the company's trainee, following a comprehensive training contract, modelled after the Korean entertainment industry.

=== 2016–2017: "Sau tất cả" and "Ghen" ===
After the training period, Erik officially debuted with his first song entitled "Sau tất cả" (lit. After All) on January 11, 2016, on appearing the YouTube channel of St.319 Entertainment. Two days later, a video was released suggesting he would be the first member of the project group, Monstar. On January 15, the official music video for "Sau tất cả" was released on St.319 Entertainment's YouTube channel. The song gained attention, not only in the V-pop fandom but also by the general public during the first half of 2016, bring him fame and awards. Sau tất cả was also on the list of "Classic Sayings on Social Media in 2016" voted by VnExpress, in addition to being covered by many singers, celebrities and international fans. In the mainstream media, this song was dubbed as the "national song" of Vietnam. The Vietnamese magazine, Hoa Học Trò noted the success of the song had a lasting impact.

In the first half of 2016, Erik participated in recording for two soundtrack songs including "Yeu & Yeu" (Love & Love) which is the OST of the movie "Benh vien ma" (Ghost Hospital) and "Tôi là ai trong em" (Who am I in you) of the movie "Taxi! Em tên gì?" (Taxi! What's your name?). On September 6, St.319 Entertainment officially released the MV for the debut of a new group called Monstar consisting of three members, Erik, Nicky, Key, in which Erik is the main vocal of the group. In December, as a Vietnam-Korea tourism ambassador selected by the Korea National Administration of Tourism, Monstar participated in a series of tourism promotion activities in Korea, in which the highlight was the launch of a music video titled "Love Rain" featuring Park Hwan-hee. In the last days of 2016, Erik continued released the song "Lạc nhau có phải muôn đời" (Is it lost forever), as part of the soundtrack to the movie "Chờ em đến ngày mai" (Waiting for you until tomorrow). This song and the success of the previous soundtrack songs helped Erik win the nickname "The Prince of Soundtrack". The music video for the song included model Quang Dai and Miss Teen 2012 Thu Trang.

In 2017, Erik decided to leave Monstar and St.319 Entertainment and become a freelance singer. In later activities, many times Erik and Monstar attended the same event, they still freely talked and took pictures together.

=== 2017–present: Released "Ghen Cô Vy", "Em không sai, chúng ta sai", "Anh luôn là lý do" and participation in The Heroes ===
Three months later, Erik as a freelance singer teamed up with another former St.319 Entertainment singer, Min, to release a new MV Ghen. The MV has received a lot of attention from the audience, marking his strong comeback as well as the excitement when the two artists are singers who used to be a part in St.319 Entertainment in the past. The song was produced by AD Production and composed by musician Khac Hung, this is considered another interesting coincidence when Khac Hung is the one who collaborated with St.319 Entertainment to produce Erik's song "Sau Tat Ca" (After All). This song also achieved high achievements on Vietnamese music charts, after more than 4 days of airing, Ghen has reached 3.5 million views and ranked first on the top trending of the song on YouTube Vietnam.

After leaving St.319 Entertainment, Erik was an artist of HI Entertainment. The first product after joining HI Entertainment was the song "Đừng xin lỗi nữa" (Don't Apologize), which attracted a lot of attention from audience, especially from the audience of the movie Lala: Let me love you. After the success of the song "Đừng xin lỗi nữa" (Don't Apologize)", HI Entertainment has continued to collaborate with a Korean musician to release the song "Mình chia tay đi" (Let's break up), which leaving many good impressions of audience for Erik, especially from the audience of the movie "Cua lại vợ bầu" (Flirt my wife again). Erik's most successful product at HI Entertainment is the super hit "Chạm đáy nỗi đau" (At the bottom of the pain), which has won a resounding success, quickly surpassing the milestone of 100 million views on YouTube. Following the success of that song, Erik continued to release the next two products, "Đừng có mơ" (Stop Dreamming) and "Anh ta là sao" (Who is He). In February 2019, Erik collaborated with Korean group Momoland. According to the plan, the joint product between Erik and the Momoland will be released in May 2019. On July 28, 2019, Erik officially released the new MV "Có tất cả nhưng thiếu anh" (Having it all but missing you) and then quickly reached the top 1 trending YouTube Vietnam only one day after the MV was released.

In 2020, in the context of the COVID-19 pandemic, he collaborated with female singer Min to release the song "Ghen Cô Vy" to propagate epidemic prevention, the song soon achieved relative success internationally and became a viral video, praised by many music magazines including Billboard.

On 6 May 2020, Erik released the new MV "Em không sai, chúng ta sai" (You are not wrong, we are wrong). This ballad song was composed by musician Nguyen Phuc Thien, and the MV was performed by director Dinh Ha Uyen Thu. This is also the first time Miss Vietnam 2018 Tran Tieu Vy has starred in an MV. The song is about a boy's regret and torment when he can't keep his lover with him.

In January 2021, Erik released the new MV "Anh luôn là lý do" (I'm Always the Reason). After that, he participated in the program The Heroes 2021. Erik was the champion with 9.88 points, thanks to the song Nam Quốc Sơn Hà which is related and contains national spirit. He wore ao dai and performed a new song composed by the producer team DTAP. The song "Máu đỏ da vàng" has a world music sound, mixed with a little house to create a fast-paced, joyful rhythm. Erik sings, raps, tells stories about Vietnamese people rising from difficulties, with the strength of solidarity, they can overcome all challenges.

On January 26, 2022, Erik released the MV "Yêu đương khó quá thì chạy về khóc với anh" (Cry with me if love is too hard). This is a song with bold Asian characteristics in terms of images and melodies. At first, it gained controversy, due to claims that it "plagiarizes the popular Chinese song 青花瓷 (Qīng Huā Cí)" originally sung by Jay Chou, which Erik reportedly denied. However, it does use the melodies of three soundtracks from the Liyue region from the Chinese 2020 videogame Genshin Impact: Peaceful Hike (Qingce Village Daytime), Cozy Leisure Time (Wangshu Inn Daytime), and Maiden's Longing (a variation of the theme "Moon in One's Cup", originally composed with lyrics by Yu-Peng Chen in 2018). The first one is mentioned in the credits of Erik's song, alongside the name of the game. Over the course of the year, his song has created love with the audience and was covered by a lot of audience dancing and singing.

On 11 July 2022, Erik released the soundtrack of "Là mây trên bầu trời của ai đó" (Being a cloud in someone's sky). Erik sang this song sweetly.

On 1 August 2022, Erik collaborated with producer W/n in the song "3107".

On 11 November 2022, Erik officially announced the company ENS Entertainment (a part of V-MAS).

On 15 November 2022, Erik released the soundtrack of the movie "Hạnh phúc máu" (Blood Happiness).

== Discography ==
=== Mini album ===
- DCM The First Mini Album (2018)

=== Singles ===
Year	Title	Producer(s)	Songwriter(s)	Release date
2015	I Love You (I heart you) (ft. Min)	Khắc Hưng	Khắc Hưng	March 17, 2015
2016	Mùa đông (Winter)	Khắc Hưng	Hoàng Thống	January 22, 2016
2017	Chờ nhau nhé (ft. Suni Hạ Linh)	WeChoice	Đông Âu, Grey D	January 12, 2017
2017	Mẹ yêu (ft. Nguyễn Trần Trung Quân)	Khắc Hưng	Phương Uyên	March 8, 2017
2017	Từ bỏ (Cover)	AD Production	Khắc Hưng	April 25, 2017
2017	Happy Ending	Nguyễn Duy Anh	Nguyễn Hồng Thuận	June 27, 2017
2017	Đi rồi sẽ đến	Tiên Cookie	Tiên Cookie	August 15, 2017
2017	Yêu chưa bao giờ là sai	NEMO	Nguyễn Hồng Thuận	November 29, 2017
2018	Đừng xin lỗi nữa	Sungkyoon Kim	Sungkyoon Kim, Toypiano, Tăng Nhật Tuệ	January 18, 2018
2018	Mình chia tay đi	Shin Hyun Woo, Krazy Park	Shin Hyun Woo, Krazy Park, Trang Pháp	September 5, 2018
2018	Chạm đáy nỗi đau	Mr. Siro	Mr. Siro	April 27, 2018
2018	Đừng có mơ	Masew	Krazy Park, Peter Pan, Bảo Kun	December 14, 2018
2019	Anh ta là sao(ft.OSAD)	Nguyen Bao	Hùng Quân, OSAD	April 24, 2019
2019	Có tất cả nhưng thiếu anh	Nguyen Nam Minh Thuy	Vương Anh Tú	July 28, 2019
2020	Em không sai, chúng ta sai	Nguyễn Phúc Thiện	Nguyễn Phúc Thiện	May 6, 2020
2020	Ăn sáng nha(ft.Suni Hạ Linh)	Khắc Hưng	Khắc Hưng	June 3, 2020
2021	Dịu dàng em đến	DTAP	RedT, Kata Trần	August 30, 2021
2021	Nam Quốc Sơn Hà	DTAP	Thịnh Kainz, Hành Or, RTee	October 25, 2021
2021	Máu đỏ da vàng	DTAP	Kata Trần, Thịnh Kainz	November 28, 2021
2022	Chạy về khóc với anh	Nguyễn Phúc Thiện	Nguyễn Phúc Thiện	January 26, 2022
2022	Đau nhất là lặng im	Đoàn Minh Vũ	Erik; Quang Hùng MasterD; Hưng Cacao; Nguyễn Phúc Thiện; Daa Major	February 17, 2022
2022	Thientai	DTAP	Thịnh Kainz, Kaler Khang, N.	November 20, 2022
2023	Người Lạ Trong Danh Bạ(ft.Phúc Du)	TDK	TDK; Phúc Du	May 24, 2023
2023	Xoa Đầu	Erik	Inus Team	July 20, 2023

=== Music Videos ===
Year	Title	Songwriter(s)	Producer(s)
2016	"Sau tất cả"	Khắc Hưng	Khắc Hưng
2016	"Turn It Up – Dance Practice" with Monstar	Khắc Hưng, Nicky, Key	Khắc Hưng
2016	"#Babybaby" with Monstar	Khắc Hưng, Nicky, Key	Khắc Hưng
2016	"Love Rain" with Monstar	Kim Tae Woo, Nicky, Grey D	Khắc Hưng
2017	"Lạc nhau có phải muôn đời"	Triết Phạm	Khắc Hưng
2017	"Điều buồn nhất" (ft. Kai Đinh)	Kai Đinh	Kai Đinh
2017	"Ghen" (ft. Min)	Khắc Hưng	Khắc Hưng
2017	"Chưa bao giờ mẹ kể" (ft. Min)	Châu Đăng Khoa	Châu Đăng Khoa
2017	"Như cái lò" (ft. Min, Mr.A, Sambi)	Khắc Hưng, Mr.A	Khắc Hưng
2017	"Đừng xin lỗi nữa" (ft. Min)	Sungkyoon Kim, Toypiano, Tăng Nhật Tuệ	Sungkyoon Kim
2018	"Chạm đáy nỗi đau"	Mr. Siro	Mr. Siro
2018	"Mình chia tay đi"	Shin Hyun Woo, Krazy Park, Trang Pháp	Shin Hyun Woo, Krazy Park
2018	"Đừng có mơ"	Krazy Park, Peter Pan, Bảo Kun	Masew
2019	"Anh ta là sao"(ft.OSAD)	Hùng Quân, OSAD	Nguyễn Bảo
2019	"Love Is Only You" (ft. Momoland)	Duble Sidekick, Seion, Black Edition	Duble Sidekick, Seion, Black Edition
2019	"Có tất cả nhưng thiếu anh"	Vương Anh Tú	Nguyễn Nam Minh Thụy
2020	"Tết trong tim mình" (ft. Ninh Dương Lan Ngọc)	Dương Khắc Linh	Dương Khắc Linh
2020	"Ghen cô vy" (ft. Min)	Khắc Hưng	Khắc Hưng
2020	"Em không sai, chúng ta sai"	Nguyễn Phúc Thiện	Nguyễn Phúc Thiện
2021	Anh luôn là lý do	Nguyễn Phúc Thiện; Lou Hoàng	Nguyễn Phúc Thiện
2021	Dịu dàng em đến	RedT, Kata Trần	DTAP
2022	Chạy Về Khóc Với Anh	Nguyễn Phúc Thiện	Nguyễn Phúc Thiện
2022	Đau nhất là lặng im	Erik; Quang Hùng MasterD; Hưng Cacao; Nguyễn Phúc Thiện; Daa Major	Đoàn Minh Vũ
2022	Thientai	Thịnh Kainz, Kaler Khang, N.	DTAP

=== Soundtrack (OST) ===
Year	Title	Producer(s)	Songwriter(s)	Established Date	Film
2016	"Tôi là ai trong em (Đồi thông)"	Khắc Hưng	Việt Anh	February 26, 2016	Taxi, tên em là gì?
2016	"Yêu & yêu"	Khắc Hưng	Dương Khắc Linh, Hoàng Huy Long, Trấn Thành	April 11, 2016	Bệnh viện ma
2016	"Lạc nhau có phải muôn đời"	Khắc Hưng	Triết Phạm	December 30, 2016	Chờ em đến ngày mai
2019	''Mình chia tay đi''	Shin Huyn Woo, Krazy Park	Shin Huyn Woo, Krazy Park, Trang Pháp	February 15, 2019	Cua lại vợ bầu
2020	Anh đi đi (ft Hương Giang)	ViruSs	ViruSs	February 20, 2020	Sắc đẹp dối trá
2022	Là mây trên bầu trời của ai đó	Tuyen Key	Trịnh Tú Trung	July 10, 2022	Là mây trên bầu trời của ai đó
2022	Hạnh phúc máu	Minh Simon	Hoàng Thy	November 15, 2022	Hạnh phúc máu

== Awards & nomination ==
=== International ===
Year	Awards	Category	Nominated song	Result
2020	Asia Model Festival	Asian Star Untact 2020		Win

=== Vietnam ===
Year	Awards	Category	Nominated song	Result
2016	Làn Sóng Xanh	Single of the year	Sau Tất Cả	Nominated
2016	Làn Sóng Xanh	Promising male singer	Erik	Nominated
2016	Làn Sóng Xanh	Viral song of the year	Sau tất cả	Win
2016	Yan Vpop 20 Music Awards	Song of the year	Sau tất cả	Win
2016	Yan Vpop 20 Music Awards	Top 20 songs of the year	Sau tất cả	Win
2016	Zing Music Awards	Song of the year	Sau tất cả	Win
2016	Zing Music Awards	Music Video of the year	Sau tất cả	Nominated
2016	Zing Music Awards	The song most shared by online community	Sau tất cả	Win
2016	Zing Music Awards	Music Video topped the chart for the most weeks	Sau tất cả	Nominated
2016	Zing Music Awards	Song topped the chart for the most weeks	Sau tất cả	Nominated
2016	Zing Music Awards	Favorite Pop/Rock song	Sau tất cả	Nominated
2016	Wechoice Awards	Viral phrase of the year	Sau tất cả	Nominated
2016	Wechoice Awards	Featured new singer	Erik	Nominated
2017	Làn Sóng Xanh	Top 10 favorite songs	Ghen	Win
2017	Làn Sóng Xanh	Promising singer	Erik	Win
2017	Làn Sóng Xanh	Single of the year	Ghen	Nominated
2017	Làn Sóng Xanh	Instrumental combinations	Ghen	Nominated
2017	Dedicated Music Awards	New artist of the year	Erik	Nominated
2017	Dedicated Music Awards	Song of the year	Sau tất cả	Nominated
2017	Zing Music Awards	Music Video of the year	Ghen	Win
2017	Zing Music Awards	Favorite Dance/Electronic song	Ghen	Nominated
2017	Zing Music Awards	Favorite R&B/Soul song	Chưa bao giờ mẹ kể	Nominated
2017	Zing Music Awards	Favorite Movie Song	Lạc nhau có phải muôn đời	Nominated
2017	Zing Music Awards	Favorite Duet/Group	Erik & Min	Win
2017	Keeng Young Awards	Song of the year	Ghen	Nominated
2017	Keeng Young Awards	Favorite Male Artist	Erik	Nominated
2017	Keeng Young Awards	Collaborative song	Ghen	Nominated
2017	Keeng Young Awards	Dance music song	Ghen	Nominated
2017	Keeng Young Awards	Pop song	Chờ nhau nhé	Win
2017	Wechoice Awards	Most favourite Music Video	Ghen	Nominated
2018	Làn Sóng Xanh	Male singer of the year	Erik	Nominated
2018	Làn Sóng Xanh	Song of the year	Chạm đáy nỗi đau	Nominated
2018	Làn Sóng Xanh	Favorite Movie Song	Đừng xin lỗi nữa	Nominated
2018	Làn Sóng Xanh	Top 10 favorite songs	Chạm đáy nỗi đau	Nominated
2018	Làn Sóng Xanh	Top 10 favorite singers	Erik	Win
2018	Dedicated Music Awards	New Artist of the Year	Erik	Win
2018	Mai Vàng Awards	Music Video	Ghen	Nominated
2018	Mai Vàng Awards	Song	Mặt trời vẫn tới mỗi người	Nominated
2018	Wechoice Awards	Singer with breakthrough activities	Erik	Nominated
2018	Wechoice Awards	Favorite Music Video	Chạm đáy nỗi đau	Nominated
2018	Zing Music Awards	Artist of the year	Erik	Nominated
2018	Zing Music Awards	Song of the year	Chạm đáy nỗi đau	Nominated
2018	Zing Music Awards	Music Video of the year	Chạm đáy nỗi đau	Nominated
2018	Zing Music Awards	Favorite Male Singer	Erik	Nominated
2018	Zing Music Awards	Favorite combination	Erik & Min	Nominated
2018	Zing Music Awards	Favorite Pop/ Ballad song	Chạm đáy nỗi đau	Nominated
2018	Zing Music Awards	Favorite movie song	Đừng xin lỗi nữa	Nominated
2018	Keeng Young Awards	Favorite Male Singer	Erik	Nominated
2018	Keeng Young Awards	Top 3 favorite waiting music songs		Win
2018	Elle Style Awards	Styling Male Singer of the Year	Erik	
2018	V-live Year End Party	Best Interactive Star	Erik	Win
2019	Dedicated Music Awards	Music Video of the year	"Chạm đáy nỗi đau"	Nominated
2019	Zing Music Awards	Artist of the year	Erik	Win
2019	Zing Music Awards	Favorite Male Singer	Erik	Nominated
2019	Zing Music Awards	Favorite R&B/Soul song	Anh ta là sao	Nominated
2020	Dedicated Music Awards	Music Video of the year	Em không sai chúng ta sai	Nominated
2020	Làn Sóng Xanh	Male singer of the year	Erik	Nominated
2020	Làn Sóng Xanh	Song of the year	Em không sai chúng ta sai	Nominated
2020	Làn Sóng Xanh	Viral song	Em không sai chúng ta sai	Nominated
2020	Làn Sóng Xanh	Favorite song on radio	Em không sai chúng ta sai	Win
2020	Làn Sóng Xanh	Top 10 favorite songs	Em không sai chúng ta sai	Win
2020	Mai Vàng Awards	Ballad male singer	Erik	Nominated
2020	VTV Awards	Impressed artist	Erik	Nominated
2020	Zing Music Awards	Artist of the year	Erik	Win
2020	Zing Music Awards	Favorite Male Singer	Erik	Nominated
2020	Zing Music Awards	Favorite Pop/Ballad song	Em không sai chúng ta sai	Nominated
2020	Wechoice Awards	Inspirational characters	Ekip Ghen Cô Vy	Nominated
2020	Wechoice Awards	Singer with breakthrough activities	Erik	Nominated
2020	Wechoice Awards	Music Video of the year	Em không sai chúng ta sai	Nominated
2020	Wechoice Awards	Social media trend of the year	Ghen Cô Vy	Nominated
2020	VLive Awards	Best Vpop Comeback	Erik	Nominated
2021	VTV Awards	Impressed artist	Erik	Nominated
2021	Làn Sóng Xanh	Male singer of the year	Erik	Nominated
2021	Làn Sóng Xanh	Instrumental combinations	Nam quốc sơn hà	Nominated
2021	Làn Sóng Xanh	Excellent combination	Erik, Phương Mỹ Chi, DTAP, RTEE, Hành Or, Ninja Z	Nominated
2022	Làn Sóng Xanh	Top 10 most favourite songs	Yêu đương khó quá thì chạy về khóc với anh	Win
