= The Masked Singer Vietnam season 2 =

The Masked Singer Vietnam
- Season 2
- Starring: Trấn Thành; Tóc Tiên; Bích Phương
- Hosted by: Ngô Kiến Huy
- No. of contestants: 18
- Winner: Anh Tú as "Voi Bản Đôn (Ban Don Elephant)"
- Runner-up: Orange as "Ong Bây Bi (Baby Bee)"
- No. of episodes: 17

Release
- Original network: HTV2
- Original release: August 4 – December 16, 2023

Season chronology
- ← Previous; Season 1

The second season of The Masked Singer Vietnam premiered on HTV2 and VieON on 4 August 2023. The winner of this season was Anh Tú with the mascot "Voi Bản Đôn (Ban Don Elephant)", while runner-up belonged to Orange with the mascot "Ong Bây Bi (Baby Bee)" and third place belonged to Hương Lan with the mascot "Cú Tây Bắc (Northwest Owl)".

== Panelists and Host ==
Ngô Kiến Huy returned as host this season. Trấn Thành and Tóc Tiên also returned as panelists, while Đức Phúc was replaced by Bích Phương. And just like the last season, the guest panelists appear in each episode.

Similar to the previous season, there is the "Golden Ears" trophy for the best panelist of the season. Trấn Thành won this season's trophy with 11 correct identities out of 18 mascots, including the duo mascot "Cá Ngựa Đôi (Seahorse Twinsies)".

== Contestants ==
The number of contestants went up from 15 to 18. And for the first time there is a duo contestant competing.

Round 1 featured 12 contestants divided into 3 groups of 4 with one eliminated in each episode. In Round 2, each group features 2 wildcards contestants entering the competition replacing previously eliminated contestants. In Round 3 the 12 remaining contestants are mixed into 3 random groups of 4 with the winners of the last round representing their own groups. Round 4 features the 3 remaining singers of the same groups with one winner and the bottom two singing for survival.

Results
Stage name		Celebrity	Episodes																
Stage name		Celebrity	1	2 (Note: From this episode and til Episode 6, the performances were aired on Friday and eliminations and unmaskings air on Wednesday.)	3	4	5	6	7 (Note: From this episode and onwards, the performances and unmaskings both return to airing on Friday.)	8	9	10	11	12	13	14	15	16	17
Stage name		Celebrity	Round 1			Round 2			Round 3			Round 4			Round 5	Round 6	Semi-Final	Final	Awards ceremony
B	Voi Bản Đôn (Ban Don Elephant)	Anh Tú		WIN			SAFE		SAFE			RISK			SAFE	SAFE	SAFE	SAFE	WINNER
A	Ong Bây Bi (Baby Bee) (WC)	Orange				WIN					RISK			WIN	WIN	RISK	RISK	WIN	RUNNER-UP
A	Cú Tây Bắc (Northwest Owl)	Hương Lan	SAFE			SAFE			WIN			WIN			RISK	SAFE	RISK	RISK	THIRD
A	HippoHappy	Lâm Bảo Ngọc	WIN			SAFE				WIN			RISK		RISK	WIN	WIN	OUT	
B	Bố Gấu (Papa Bear) (WC)	Hoàng Hải					RISK				WIN			RISK	SAFE	OUT			
B	Cún Tóc Lô (Pup in Hair Rollers)	Ngọc Anh		SAFE			WIN			SAFE			WIN		OUT				
C	Chuột Cherry (Cherry Mouse)	Nhật Thủy			RISK			RISK			SAFE			OUT					
C	Sứa Thủy Tinh (Glassy Jellyfish)	Phượng Vũ			SAFE			SAFE		RISK			OUT						
C	Nàng Tiên Hoa (Flower Fairy) (WC)	Dương Hoàng Yến						WIN	RISK			OUT							
A	Kỳ Lân Lãng Tử (Romantic Unicorn)	Dương Edward	RISK			RISK					OUT								
C	Thỏ Xỏ Khuyên (Pierced Rabbit)	Hoàng Dũng			WIN			SAFE		OUT									
B	Cáo Tiểu Thư (Fox Lady) (WC)	Vũ Thảo My					SAFE		OUT										
C	Tê Giác Ngộ Nghĩnh (Funky Rhino) (WC)	Châu Khải Phong						OUT											
B	Cừu Bông (Fluffy Sheep)	Khởi My		RISK			OUT												
A	Bạch Khổng Tước (White Peacock) (WC)	Hoàng Mỹ An				OUT													
C	Madame Vịt (Madame Duck)	Kháh Linh			OUT														
B	Cá Ngựa Đôi (Seahorse Twinsies)	Phạm Đình Thái Ngân		OUT															
B	Cá Ngựa Đôi (Seahorse Twinsies)	Trương Thảo Nhi		OUT															
A	Khỉ Hồng (Pink Monkey)	Ưng Hoàng Phúc	OUT																

- A The masked singer is on Group A.
- B The masked singer is on Group B.
- C The masked singer is on Group C.
- WINNER The masked singer won first place.
- RUNNER-UP The masked singer won second place.
- THIRD PLACE The masked singer won third place.
- WIN The masked singer won their respective round and moved on to the next round.
- SAFE The masked singer was safe from elimination.
- RISK The masked singer is in the group with the lowest number of votes or must participate in the Battle Round but was not eliminated.
- OUT The masked singer was eliminated from the competition and unmasked upon their elimination.
- The masked singer did not perform
- (WC) This masked singer is a wildcard contestant.

== Episodes ==
=== Episode 1 (August 4) ===
- Guest panelist: Song Luân

Performances in the first episode
#	Stage name	Song	Results		
1	Khỉ Hồng (Pink Monkey)	"Vì anh là vậy" by Mew Amazing and Trọng Hiếu	RISK		
2	Kỳ Lân Lãng Tử (Romantic Unicorn)	"Cảm giác lúc ấy sẽ ra sao" by Only C and Hưng Cacao	RISK		
3	Cú Tây Bắc (Northwest Owl)	"Đưa em tìm động hoa vàng" by Phạm Duy (music) and Phạm Thiên Thư (poem)	SAFE		
4	HippoHappy	"Quá khứ còn lại gì" by Vũ Minh Tâm	WIN		
Battle round			Identity	Votes	Result
1	Khỉ Hồng (Pink Monkey)	"Sợ rằng em biết anh còn yêu em" by Vương Anh Tú	Ưng Hoàng Phúc	35,97%	OUT
2	Kỳ Lân Lãng Tử (Romantic Unicorn)	"Sợ rằng em biết anh còn yêu em" by Vương Anh Tú	undisclosed	64,03%	SAFE

- Unmasking performance: "Thà rằng như thế" by Nguyễn Hoài Anh, performed by Ưng Hoàng Phúc.

=== Episode 2 (August 11/16) ===
- Guest panelist: Bảo Anh

Performances in the second episode
#	Stage name	Song	Results		
1	Cừu Bông (Fluffy Sheep)	"Bước qua đời nhau" by Khắc Việt	RISK		
2	Voi Bản Đôn (Ban Don Elephant)	"Ngày mai người ta lấy chồng" by Đông Thiên Đức	WIN		
3	Cá Ngựa Đôi (Seahorse Twinsies)	"Đừng ngoảnh lại" by Lưu Hương Giang – "Để em rời xa" by Phúc Bồ	RISK		
4	Cún Tóc Lô (Pup in Hair Rollers)	"Yêu như ngày yêu cuối" by Tăng Nhật Tuệ	SAFE		
Battle round			Identity	Votes	Result
1	Cừu Bông (Fluffy Sheep)	"Tận cùng nỗi nhớ" by Andiez	undisclosed	62,59%	SAFE
2	Cá Ngựa Đôi (Seahorse Twinsies)	"Tận cùng nỗi nhớ" by Andiez	Phạm Đình Thái Ngân	37,41%	OUT
2	Cá Ngựa Đôi (Seahorse Twinsies)	"Tận cùng nỗi nhớ" by Andiez	Trương Thảo Nhi	37,41%	OUT

- Unmasking performances: "Em là lý do" by Phạm Đình Thái Ngân and "Chạy qua bao con phố" by Trương Thảo Nhi, performed by Phạm Đình Thái Ngân and Trương Thảo Nhi.

=== Episode 3 (August 18/23) ===
- Guess panelist: Rocker Nguyễn

Performances in the third episode
#	Stage name	Song	Results		
1	Madame Vịt (Madame Duck)	"Thị Mầu" by Nguyễn Hoàng Phong and Masew	RISK		
2	Thỏ Xỏ Khuyên (Pierced Rabbit)	"Khi người mình yêu khóc" by Phan Mạnh Quỳnh	WIN		
3	Chuột Cherry (Cherry Mouse)	"Em yêu anh nhiều lắm" by Sỹ Luân	RISK		
4	Sứa Thủy Tinh (Glassy Jellyfish)	"Lửng lơ" by Masew, B Ray, RedT and Ý Tiên	SAFE		
Battle round			Identity	Votes	Result
1	Madame Vịt (Madame Duck)	"Buông" by Vũ Ngọc Bích	Khánh Linh	35,97%	OUT
2	Chuột Cherry (Cherry Mouse)	"Buông" by Vũ Ngọc Bích	undisclosed	64,03%	SAFE

- Unmasking performance: "Anh cứ đi đi" by Vương Anh Tú, performed by Khánh Linh.

=== Episode 4 (August 25/30) ===
- Guest panelist: Hà Nhi
- Topic: Dream & Business

Performances in the fourth episode
#	Stage name	Song	Identity	Votes	Result
1	Kỳ Lân Lãng Tử (Romantic Unicorn)	"Tell Me Why" by Mr.A	undisclosed	13,60%	RISK
WC	Ong Bây Bi (Baby Bee)	"Giá như cô ấy chưa xuất hiện" by Vương Anh Tú	undisclosed	26,21%	WIN
2	HippoHappy	"Vùng ký ức" by Duy Khang	undisclosed	24,27%	SAFE
WC	Bạch Khổng Tước (White Peacock)	"Như lời đồn" by Khắc Hưng	Hoàng Mỹ An	11,65%	OUT
3	Cú Tây Bắc (Northwest Owl)	"Tình yêu màu nắng" by Phạm Thanh Hà	undisclosed	24,27%	SAFE

- Unmasking performance: "Bức thư cuối gửi anh" by Vũ Ngọc Bích, performed by Hoàng Mỹ An.

=== Episode 5 (September 1/6) ===
- Guest panelist: Bảo Anh
- Topic: Crazy Love

Performances in the fifth episode
#	Stage name	Song	Identity	Votes	Result
1	Voi Bản Đôn (Ban Don Elephant)	"Rời bỏ" by Vũ Huy Hoàng	undisclosed	19,42%	SAFE
2	Cừu Bông (Fluffy Sheep)	"Họ yêu ai mất rồi" by Doãn Hiếu	Khởi My	17,48%	OUT
WC	Bố Gấu (Papa Bear)	"Đã sai từ lúc đầu" by Nguyễn Minh Cường	undisclosed	18,45%	RISK
3	Cún Tóc Lô (Pup in Hair Rollers)	"Em gái mưa" by Mr. Siro	undisclosed	24,27%	WIN
WC	Cáo Tiểu Thư (Fox Lady)	"Cơn mưa ngang qua" by Sơn Tùng M-TP	undisclosed	20,39%	SAFE

- Unmasking performance: "Người yêu cũ" by Phan Mạnh Quỳnh, performed by Khởi My.

=== Episode 6 (September 15/20) ===
- Guest panelist: Vũ Cát Tường
- Topic: Milestones & Numbers

Performances in the sixth episode
#	Stage name	Song	Identity	Votes	Result
1	Chuột Cherry (Cherry Mouse)	"Bùa yêu" by Tiên Cookie, Phạm Thanh Hà and DươngK	undisclosed	12,62%	RISK
WC	Tê Giác Ngộ Nghĩnh (Funky Rhino)	"Thay tôi yêu cô ấy" by Thanh Hưng	Châu Khải Phong	11,65%	OUT
2	Thỏ Xỏ Khuyên (Pierced Rabbit)	"Em mới là người yêu anh" by Khắc Hưng	undisclosed	22,33%	SAFE
3	Sứa Thủy Tinh (Glassy Jellyfish)	"Chạm đáy nỗi đau" by Mr. Siro	undisclosed	20,39%	SAFE
WC	Nàng Tiên Hoa (Flower Fairy)	"Hối duyên" by Masew and Khôi Vũ	undisclosed	33,01%	WIN

- Unmasking performance: "Ngắm hoa lệ rơi" by Duy Cường, performed by Châu Khải Phong.

=== Episode 7 (September 22) ===
- Guest panelist: Văn Mai Hương
- Topic: Mistakes

Performances in the seventh episode
#	Stage name	Group	Song	Identity	Votes	Results
1	Cáo Tiểu Thư (Fox Lady)	B	"Không ai khác ngoài em" by Madily and Ha Kiem	Vũ Thảo My	11,65%	OUT
2	Cú Tây Bắc (Northwest Owl)	A	"Ngày xưa Hoàng Thị" by Phạm Duy (music) and Phạm Thiên Thư (poem)	undisclosed	37,86%	WIN
3	Nàng Tiên Hoa (Flower Fairy)	C	"Khôn ngoan" by Trung Ngon	undisclosed	14,56%	RISK
4	Voi Bản Đôn (Ban Don Elephant)	B	"Lỗi tại mưa" by Vicky Nhung	undisclosed	35,92%	SAFE

- Unmasking performance: "Silence" by Benjamin James, performed by Vũ Thảo My.

=== Episode 8 (September 29) ===
- Guest panelist: Nhật Thủy
- Topic: Cuisine

Performances in the eighth episode
#	Stage name	Group	Song	Identity	Votes	Results
1	Sứa Thủy Tinh (Glassy Jellyfish)	C	"Em khóc được rồi" by Mew Amazing	undisclosed	17,48%	RISK
2	Thỏ Xỏ Khuyên (Pierced Rabbit)	C	"Người con gái ta thương" by Phạm Toàn Thắng (music) and Ngô Võ Giang Trung (melody)	Hoàng Dũng	15,53%	OUT
3	HippoHappy	A	"Giữ lấy làm gì" by Grey D	undisclosed	36,89%	WIN
4	Cún Tóc Lô (Pup in Hair Rollers)	B	"Phai" by Microwave	undisclosed	30,10%	SAFE

- Unmasking performance: "Đoạn kết mới" by Hoàng Dũng, performed by Hoàng Dũng.

=== Episode 9 (October 6) ===
- Guest panelist: Đạt G
- Topic: Youth

Performances in the ninth episode
#	Stage name	Group	Song	Identity	Votes	Results
1	Ong Bây Bi (Baby Bee)	A	"Chuyện đôi ta" by Emcee L	undisclosed	22,33%	RISK
2	Bố Gấu (Papa Bear)	B	"Hoàng hôn tháng Tám" by Phạm Toàn Thắng	undisclosed	32,04%	WIN
3	Kỳ Lân Lãng Tử (Romantic Unicorn)	A	"Em hát ai nghe" by Trungg I.U	Dương Edward	18,45%	OUT
4	Chuột Cherry (Cherry Mouse)	C	"Rửa mặt đi em" by Đạt G	undisclosed	27,18%	SAFE

- Unmasking performance: "Thương em" by Khắc Việt, performed by Dương Edward.

=== Episode 10 (October 13) ===
- Guest panelist: Myra Trần
- Topic: Once Resounding

Performances in the tenth episode
#	Stage name	Group	Song	Votes		Result
1	Voi Bản Đôn (Ban Don Elephant)	B	"My Everything" by Tiên Tiên	N/A		RISK
2	Nàng Tiên Hoa (Flower Fairy)	C	"Trước khi em tồn tại" by Vũ Đình Trọng Thắng	N/A		RISK
3	Cú Tây Bắc (Northwest Owl)	A	"Buồn làm chi em ơi" by Nguyễn Minh Cường – "Dang dở" by Hồ Phi Nal	38,38%		WIN
Battle round				Identity	Votes	Result
1	Voi Bản Đôn (Ban Don Elephant)	B	"Dành cho em" by Hoàng Tôn	Undisclosed	61,87%	SAFE
2	Nàng Tiên Hoa (Flower Fairy)	C	"Dành cho em" by Hoàng Tôn	Dương Hoàng Yến	38,13%	OUT

- Unmasking performance: "Dù chỉ là" by Khắc Hưng, performed by Dương Hoàng Yến.

=== Episode 11 (October 20) ===
- Guest panelist: Khắc Hưng
- Topic: Lifetime's performances

Performances in the tenth episode
#	Stage name	Group	Song	Votes		Result
1	Cún Tóc Lô (Pup in Hair Rollers)	B	"Nỗi đau ngự trị" by Lương Bằng Quang – "Như vẫn còn đây" by Phúc Trường	39,40%		WIN
2	Sứa Thủy Tinh (Glassy Jellyfish)	C	"Khóc xong quên anh" by Trung Ngon	22,22%		RISK
3	HippoHappy	A	"Buông" by Nguyễn Duy Anh	38,38%		RISK
Battle round				Identity	Votes	Result
1	HippoHappy	A	"Những kẻ mộng mơ" by Nguyễn Bảo Trọng	Undisclosed	58,99%	SAFE
2	Sứa Thủy Tinh (Glassy Jellyfish)	C	"Những kẻ mộng mơ" by Nguyễn Bảo Trọng	Phượng Vũ	41,01%	OUT

- Unmasking Performance: "Not My Only" by Mew Amazing, performed by Phượng Vū.

=== Episode 12 (October 27) ===
- Guest panelist: Quang Dũng
- Topic: A thousand pains

Performances in the tenth episode
#	Stage name	Group	Song	Votes		Result
1	Bố Gấu (Papa Bear)	B	"Trò đùa của tạo hóa" by Nguyễn Hồng Thuận	N/A		RISK
2	Chuột Cherry (Cherry Mouse)	C	"Rồi ta sẽ ngắm pháo hoa cùng nhau" by Olew	N/A		RISK
3	Ong Bây Bi (Baby Bee)	A	"Là anh đó" by Andiez	45,45%		WIN
Battle round				Identity	Votes	Result
1	Bố Gấu (Papa Bear)	B	"Tìm" by Phạm Toàn Thắng	Undisclosed	57,55%	SAFE
2	Chuột Cherry (Cherry Mouse)	C	"Tìm" by Phạm Toàn Thắng	Nhật Thủy	42,45%	OUT

- Unmasking performance: "Gật đầu" by Đoàn Minh Quân, performed by Nhật Thủy.

=== Episode 13 (November 3) ===
- Guest panelists: Thùy Chi & Erik
- Topic: Mind-blowing memories with fans - Fantastic

Performances in the thirteen episode
#	Stage name	Song	Identity	Votes	Result
1	HippoHappy	"Chắc ai đó sẽ về" by Sơn Tùng M-TP	Undisclosed	8,74%	RISK
2	Cún Tóc Lô (Pup in Hair Rollers)	"Vỡ tan" của Trịnh Thăng Bình	Ngọc Anh	7,77%	OUT
3	Cú Tây Bắc (Northwest Owl)	"Bèo dạt mây trôi" by Dân ca Quan họ and Đặng Ngọc Long (music) – "Người ơi người ở đừng về" by Dân ca Quan họ Bắc Ninh and Xuân Tứ (melody) – "Em tôi" by Thuận Yến (music) và Xuân Trường (melody)	Undisclosed	12,62%	RISK
4	Ong Bây Bi (Baby Bee)	"Gặp lại năm ta 60" by Ong Bây Bi (duet with Erik)	Undisclosed	31,07%	WIN
5	Bố Gấu (Papa Bear)	"Vô cùng" by Võ Hoài Phúc and Huỳnh Tuấn Anh	Undisclosed	14,56%	SAFE
6	Voi Bản Đôn (Ban Don Elephant)	"Khóa ly biệt" by Đông Thiên Đức	Undisclosed	25,24%	SAFE

- Unmasking performance: "Hãy yêu khi ta còn bên nhau" by Ngọc Anh, performed by Ngọc Anh.

=== Episode 14 (November 10) ===
- Guest panelist: Hứa Kim Tuyền
- Topic: OTP - One True Pairing

Performances in the fourteenth episode
#	Stage name	Song	Identity	Votes	Result
1	Ong Bây Bi (Baby Bee)	"Ngủ một mình" by Hieuthuhai, Negav (melody) and Kewtiie (music)	Undisclosed	17,48%	RISK
2	Cú Tây Bắc (Northwest Owl)	"Gọi em là đóa hoa sầu" by Phạm Duy (music) and Phạm Thiên Thư (poem)	Undisclosed	20,29%	SAFE
3	Bố Gấu (Papa Bear)	"Có nỗi buồn ghé qua" by Nguyễn Minh Cường	Hoàng Hải	12,60%	OUT
4	Voi Bản Đôn (Ban Don Elephant)	"Duyên do trời, phận tại ta" by Voi Bản Đôn and Phan Hiếu	Undisclosed	23,30%	SAFE
5	HippoHappy	"Rồi em sẽ gặp một chàng trai khác" by Hứa Kim Tuyền	Undisclosed	26,21%	WIN

- Unmasking performance: "Nhắn gió mây rằng anh yêu em" by Đoàn Minh Vũ, performed by Hoàng Hải.

=== Episode 15 (November 17) ===
- Guest panelist: Minh Tuyết
- Topic: Convergence of quintessence

Performances in the Semi-final episode
#	Stage name	Song	Identity	Partner(s)	Votes	Result
Special performance by guest
Sp.	Dứa Minh Tinh (Star Pineapple)	"Đại Minh Tinh" by Hứa Kim Tuyền	Minh Tuyết	—N/a	—N/a	—N/a
Main performances
1	Ong Bây Bi (Baby Bee)	"Lệ lưu ly" by DT Tập Rap and Drum7 – "Cắt đôi nỗi sầu" by Tăng Duy Tân	Undisclosed	Bướm Mặt Trăng (Moon Butterfly)	23,31%	RISK
2	Voi Bản Đôn (Ban Don Elephant)	"Chắc anh đang" của Tiên Tiên – "Lời tạm biệt chưa nói" của Kai Đinh	Undisclosed	Miêu Quý Tộc (Noble Cat)	25,24%	SAFE
3	Cú Tây Bắc (Northwest Owl)	"Từ đó" by Phan Mạnh Quỳnh – "Giấc mơ trưa" by Giáng Son (music) and Nguyễn Vĩnh Tiến (poem)	Undisclosed	Tí Nâu (Brown Mouse)	24,27%	RISK
4	HippoHappy	"Ngày chưa giông bão" by Phan Mạnh Quỳnh	Undisclosed	Bố Gấu (Papa Bear)	27,18%	WIN

=== Episode 16 - Final (November 24) ===
- Guest panelist: Bằng Kiều
- Topic: I am extraordinary

Performances in the final episode
#	Stage name	Song	Identity	Votes	Result
Special performance by guest
Sp.	Ếch Ca Ca (Frog Brother)	"Nếu không vui đã là sai rồi" by Ếch Ca Ca	Bằng Kiều	N/A	N/A
Main performances
1	HippoHappy	"Nói không thành lời" by Nguyễn Hải Minh Cơ	Lâm Bảo Ngọc	20,39%	OUT
2	Cú Tây Bắc (Northwest Owl)	"Bậu ơi đừng khóc" by Hamlet Trương	Undisclosed	23,3%	RISK
3	Ong Bây Bi (Baby Bee)	"Bát cơm mặn" by Ong Bây Bi and Mew Amazing	Undisclosed	30,1%	WIN
4	Voi Bản Đôn (Ban Don Elephant)	"Đừng nên nói" by Đạt G	Undisclosed	26,21%	SAFE

- Group performance: "Tôi phi thường" by Bùi Công Nam, performed by HippoHappy, Cú Tây Bắc, Ong Bây Bi and Voi Bản Đôn.
- Unmasking performance: "Trái tim tan vỡ cũng không sao" by Tiên Cookie, performed by Lâm Bảo Ngọc.

=== Episode 17 – Awards ceremony (December 16 – Live) ===
- This was part of The Masked Singer Vietnam – All-star Concert event taken place on December 16, 2023.

Performances in Awards ceremony
#	Stage name	Special performance	Unmasking performance	Identity	Votes (Note: Votes are concluded from app votes up until the Awards ceremony.)	Result
Special performance by guest
Sp.	Tí Nâu (Brown Mouse)	"Việt Nam trong tôi là" by Yến Lê	N/A	Thùy Chi	N/A	N/A
Sp.	Lady Mây (Lady Cloud)	"Môi chạm môi" by August and Tez	N/A	Myra Trần	N/A	N/A
Award ceremony
1	Ong Bây Bi (Baby Bee)	N/A	"Có đau thì đau một mình" by Orange	Orange (Note: She's also the real identity of Tiểu Phượng Hoàng (Little Phoenix).)	30,3% (122.610)	RUNNER-UP
2	Voi Bản Đôn (Ban Don Elephant)	N/A	"Một phần hai" by August and OgeNus	Anh Tú	45,4% (183.324)	WINNER
3	Cú Tây Bắc (Northwest Owl)	N/A	"Mẹ ơi, mai con về" by Hoàng Nhất	Hương Lan	24,3% (98.219)	THIRD

- Via the VieON app, Voi Bản Đôn got 183.324 votes, Cú Tây Bắc got 98.219 votes and Ong Bây Bi got 122.610 votes.
