= The Masked Singer Vietnam =

- Also known as: Ca sĩ mặt nạ
- Genre: Reality show
- Based on: King of Mask Singer by Munhwa Broadcasting Corporation
- Developed by: Bùi Hữu Đức
- Directed by: Vương Khang; Trường Khánh
- Presented by: Ngô Kiến Huy
- Starring: Trấn Thành; Tóc Tiên; Wowy; Đức Phúc; Bích Phương
- Opening theme: "Behind The Mask" by Châu Đăng Khoa, performed by Sofia, Red
- Country of origin: Vietnam
- Original language: Vietnamese
- No. of seasons: 3
- No. of episodes: 34

Production
- Executive producer: Lê Minh Trị
- Camera setup: Multi-camera
- Running time: 120–180 minutes (includes some ads)
- Production companies: Vie Channel; VieON

Original release
- Network: HTV2
- Release: July 16, 2022 – present

The Masked Singer Vietnam (Vietnamese: Ca sĩ mặt nạ, lit. 'masked singer') is a Vietnam reality singing competition that premiered on HTV2 - Vie Channel, Vie Giải Trí and the VieON app from July 16, 2022. This is the Vietnamese version of the South Korean television show King of Mask Singer, and is part of the Masked Singer franchise. The show is presented by Ngô Kiến Huy, with Trấn Thành, Tóc Tiên, Wowy (later Đức Phúc) and Bích Phương appearing in each episode as panelists, along with at least one guest panelist in each episode.

== Format ==
Each season of The Masked Singer Vietnam features a group of celebrity contestants. 15 contestants will be divided into 3 groups. They will be in mascots and their identities are hidden throughout the show. Each contestant will be provided with a hint video with clues related with that mascot. The contestant then performs a song with his or her real voice. The panelists can ask the contestant for more information, and are also provided with other clues about him/her to predict who the character is. The contestant will conceal his/her voice during that time.

At the end of each first mascots' performance, the panelists write their prediction about the contestant's real name. This is kept unknown until the contestant takes off the mask (only the first name written will be considered).

At the end of the episode, the panelists and 99 audiences in the studio will vote for their favorite contestant. This is then converted to the percentage of votes for each contestant. Whoever has the lowest votes will be eliminated and have to reveal his/her real identity.

As of season 2:

- In the first round, all mascots in a group compete together. Two lowest-voted mascots from audiences will perform a battle performance, with the lowest-voted one by panelists and audiences being eliminated. Two subsequent rounds have the same rules, but with battle round eliminated and whoever has lowest votes will instead being unmasked.
- In episodes 10–12, the remaining contestants will be divided into 3 groups, with each group consisting of 3 contestants from each group. The contestant with the highest votes is safe for the next round, and the remaining 2 must perform a play-off performance and the panelists will decide who goes on to the next round.
- In episodes 13–15, the remaining contestants will perform weekly. For the semi-final night, there will be additional mascots, and no one will be eliminated, with their votes being transferred to the final.
- In the final (episode 16), only the one with the lowest votes is eliminated. The remaining 3 continued to be voted by audiences, and results will be announced at the awards ceremony.
- The mascot with the highest votes in the Top 3 wins the title, owning the "Golden Mask" trophy. Both the runner-up and third place contestants will get a medal.

In addition, the "Golden Ear" trophy is also present for the best panelist of a season. The prediction of each panelist will be announced when a contestant is eliminated. A correct prediction will give the panelist 1 point. After all contestants' identities are revealed, the panelist has a highest score will receive the "Golden Ear" trophy.

== Production ==
Vie Channel announced in July 2022 to have bought the local franchise of King of Mask Singer. Teasers for all mascots were also announced later on. On July 6, 2022, Trấn Thành, Tóc Tiên and Wowy were announced to be the main panelists.

Talking with Thanh Niên for the show's concept, the Vie Channel representatives said: "We realize that Vietnam has many potential singers who sings very well, but it seems that they are being lost and lack opportunities to develop against the microelectronics music... If those talents have the opportunity and the stage to showcase their talent, why don't we do this to help revive professional music?".

The producers said that it took two years for them to produce and broadcast The Masked Singer Vietnam. According to the initial plan, the show would be filmed and premiered in 2021, however, due to the COVID-19 pandemic in Vietnam, it was delayed. This, nevertheless, be a time for improving the quality of the show.

The show is currently co-produced by Vie Channel and VieON.

=== Contestant selection ===
Choosing artists with each have different attributes is the first real challenge to the producers. In addition, they also tried to find artists of different ages and generations with the view to reaching more audiences. When the list of artists is complete, production begins; this takes them another half year, however, to discuss and take on the best strategy.

=== Theme song ===
The official theme song of the show is "Behind The Mask" by Châu Đăng Khoa, performed by Sofia and Red. This made the first appearance in the first episode of The Masked Singer Vietnam.

=== Design ===
==== Mascot and costumes ====
I make these mascot sets to compete against all other versions in the world, to bring it to the world and show off the talent of Vietnamese people to others, not just Asia. Those are the special points I want to give to The Masked Singer Vietnam, the quality of the product must be really delicate. Since I am a fashion person, I want everything to be beautiful. This is an artist wearing a fashion suit and a round masked head, not a mascot like any others, thus this must be more artistic and technical. With the talent of Vietnamese people and made in Vietnam to make the best of a mascot.

— Ngô Mạnh Đông Đông.

Inspired by animals, the mascot sets were designed by Ngô Mạnh Đông Đông. Each set of wings was decorated with feathers and stones. Speaking about designing the mascots, he said that he loves taking risks, upgrading himself with new challenges and hopes to receive many compliments for his "one-of-a-kind" mascot. Despite his lengthy experience in jewelry making, he still finds it difficult to design mascots. He had to invite United States' experts to Vietnam to learn and research, and even had to learn non-specialist jobs.

According to the show's representative, each mascot is built according to a different story and personality, creating a new highlight of the show that no other has at that time. The mascots are also considered to be unique and more classy than the original one. Also, the mascots are made such that they can still sing normally without the need to open their mouths but can still sing. Ngô Mạnh Đông Đông also said: "The microphone placement of each mascot is also very important. [...] We have to learn very carefully about this when putting the mic in, as well as adjusting the position of it so that the artist can see and sing normally".

In order for the artists to have the most comfortable experience singing in their mascots, the producer said that they had special requirements when ordering mascot sets with the designer. "Our order was that the mascots should be beautiful, comfortable to wear in, and technically guaranteed for the artist to be able to sing, even if they are heavy or bulky. We and the designer worked very closely together, wearing the mascot over and over again with the band, and only when the technical requirements are guaranteed can the artist wear it to sing. As "The Masked Singer Vietnam" is a competition among artists, with quality first, we does not make difficulties for artists in mascot. Mascot is just an external form that creates stories for artists, and technical factors must be guaranteed to the highest such that they can perform their best in the competition." They also said that the investment for those mascot sets took them more than 1 year with a total cost up to billions dong. The mascot sets of the program are all elaborately made, designed using many expensive materials worldwide. Each mascot set is modeled many times, and they must ensure aesthetic factors and technical requirements when performing... before making a final product. After each round, more details are added to the mascot.

Alongside mascot, Ngô Kiến Huy's costume design are also gaining attraction. Vương Khang said he was surprised to Ngô Kiến Huy's different concept to his costume every week to perform alongside dancers. According to him, his costumes cost him up to 500 million dong for making every appearance being neat. The mask is also one of the elements that he takes effort to. For him, the host is a symbol of the show; so the masks play an extremely important role in it.

==== Stage ====
In each performance, the stage is staged in a different style with meticulous props to illustrate it. Every angle is also calculated to create an extreme performance with excellent visual effects, in order to make more sympathy with the audience.

=== Security ===
All contestants in The Masked Singer Vietnam are kept completely anonymous with both the audience and other staff outside the crew. They are not allowed to travel by personal vehicles and are not accompanied by any assistants or managers. Instead, a dedicated car will take them to the set and record at the scheduled time frame. They will then put on their masks and move into the waiting room, each with a separate room, labeled with each artist's name such that no one knows who they are sharing with. Those rooms only allows stylists and crews to come in to assist them with costume-related issues. They always have the companionship and supervision of the crew members whenever they go to ensure absolute confidentiality of their identities. Thảo Trang shared during her participation: "This is not just a gameshow of singing and performing, but also a test of endurance in tight costumes. Wearing this mask is a bit hard to hear, but when singing, each singer will have earphones." Mai Tiến Dũng added: "Parking is also not allowed, everyone has to pick each other up afar, walk in while covered with blankets, each has a separate room. I heard the voice and suspiciously recognize the singer, but I couldn't shake hands, each was completely isolated, and all hidden after singing". The identities of the mascot artists are kept strictly confidential by the crew and are only revealed when they take off their masks on the stage.

=== Music ===
Hoài Sa currently is the music director, and also one of the few people who know the real identities of the mascots participating in the show. According to his revelation, there's a legendary artist participating the show. Sharing when he was assigned the role of music director for the program, he said that the participants were not contestants but actually celebrities, and understands what is the strength of each person because he has worked with them before. "But, in the program, they have to sing songs that don't - make - their - name. It's a difficult problem but also exciting for me", he said, "When they practice they sing out of habits, but on stage, the aura will come in and they will have real feelings. I sit there and connect them with the orchestra, the real emotion comes from that."

== Broadcasting ==
The Masked Singer Vietnam debuted on July 16, 2022. The first season premiered on HTV2 - Vie Channel and Vie Giải Trí every Saturday at 8:00 p.m. (GMT+7), alongside the VieON app which premiered it 30 minutes earlier. All episodes are also premiered on Vie Channel's official YouTube channel at 9:00 p.m.. The awards ceremony were live simultaneously on television, the VieON app and the producer's official YouTube channel from 10:30 p.m. on November 19, 2022.

The second season was premiered simultaneously on HTV2, VTVCab 1 and the VieON app every Friday at 9:00 p.m., also premiered on the producer's official YouTube channel. Both main performances and unmasking were aired on the same episode, except for episodes 2–6, which aired the unmasking part as a standalone part on Wednesdays. The awards ceremony was live from 10:00 p.m. on December 16, 2023.

== Panelists and host ==
In the first season, Trấn Thành, Tóc Tiên and Wowy served as the initial panelists, while Ngô Kiến Huy being the host. For some reasons, however, Wowy only appears in the first two rounds, and Đức Phúc was then announced as an alternative. Guest panelists also appear throughout the season. In season two Đức Phúc was replaced by Bích Phương.

== List of seasons ==
Seasons overview
Season	Contestants	Episodes	Originally released		Winner	Runner-up	Third place	Ref.
Season	Contestants	Episodes	First released	Last released	Winner	Runner-up	Third place	Ref.
1	15	17	July 16, 2022	November 19, 2022	Ngọc Mai as "O Sen (Ms. Lotus)"	Trần Thu Hà as "Phượng Hoàng Lửa (Fire Phoenix)"	Myra Trần as "Lady Mây (Lady Cloud)"	
2	18	17	August 4, 2023	December 16, 2023	Anh Tú as "Voi Bản Đôn (Ban Don Elephant)"	Orange as "Ong Bây Bi (Baby Bee)"	Hương Lan as "Cú Tây Bắc (Northwest Owl)"	
3	15	TBA	October 3, 2026	TBA	TBA	TBA	TBA	TBA

== Season 1 ==
Contestants

Results
Stage name		Celebrity	Episodes																
Stage name		Celebrity	1 (Note: No one was eliminated in this episode as this was an introductory episode.)	2	3	4	5	6	7	8	9	10	11	12	13	14	15	16	17
Stage name		Celebrity	Round 1						Round 2			Round 3			Round 4	Round 5	Semi-finals	Final	Awards ceremony
B	O Sen (Ms. Lotus)	Ngọc Mai		SAFE			SAFE			RISK				WIN	SAFE	RISK	RISK	SAFE	WINNER
C	Phượng Hoàng Lửa (Fire Phoenix)	Hà Trần			SAFE			SAFE			SAFE		WIN		RISK	SAFE	SAFE	SAFE	RUNNER-UP
A	Lady Mây (Cloud Lady)	Myra Trần	SAFE			SAFE			SAFE					RISK	SAFE	SAFE	SAFE	RISK	THIRD
C	Tí Nâu (Brown Mouse)	Thùy Chi			SAFE			RISK			SAFE	WIN			SAFE	SAFE	RISK	OUT	
B	Hươu Thần (Deer God)	Mai Tiến Dũng		SAFE			SAFE			SAFE			RISK		RISK	OUT			
B	Báo Mắt Biếc (Blue-Eyed Leopard)	Uyên Linh		SAFE			RISK			SAFE		RISK			OUT				
C	Kỳ Đà Hoa (Flowered Iguana)	Thảo Trang			SAFE			SAFE			RISK			OUT					
A	Chàng Lúa (Paddy Guy)	Tăng Phúc	SAFE			RISK			RISK				OUT						
A	Miêu Quý Tộc (Noble Cat)	Hà Nhi	SAFE			SAFE			SAFE			OUT							
C	Bướm Mặt Trăng (Moon Butterfly)	Trung Quân			SAFE			SAFE			OUT								
B	Buffalove	Vương Anh Tú		SAFE			SAFE			OUT									
A	Kim Sa Ngư (Sequin Goldfish)	Lương Bích Hữu	SAFE			SAFE			OUT										
C	Nhím Uiza (Ouchie Hedgehog)	Song Luân			SAFE			OUT											
B	ChipChip Pink	Juky San		SAFE			OUT												
A	Phi Hành Gia Heo (Pig Astronaut)	Vũ	SAFE			OUT													

- A The masked singer is on Group A.
- B The masked singer is on Group B.
- C The masked singer is on Group C.
- WINNER The masked singer won first place.
- RUNNER-UP The masked singer won second place.
- THIRD PLACE The masked singer won third place.
- WIN The masked singer won their respective round and moved on to the next round. (Note: Only applied when the contestant is the only one who doesn't have to compete in the Battle Round in Round 3.)
- SAFE The masked singer was safe from elimination.
- RISK The masked singer is in the group with the lowest number of votes or must participate in the Battle Round but wasn't eliminated.
- OUT The masked singer was eliminated from the competition and unmasked upon their elimination.
- The masked singer did not perform.

Episodes

=== Episode 1 (July 16) ===
- Guest panelist: Minh Hằng
- References:
- Opening performance: "Behind The Mask" by Châu Đăng Khoa, performed by Sofia and Red.

Performances in the first episode
#	Stage name	Song	Votes
1	Miêu Quý Tộc (Noble Cat)	"Tâm sự cùng người lạ" by Tiên Cookie	18,45%
2	Phi Hành Gia Heo (Pig Astronaut)	"Vài lần đón đưa" by Trần Lê	11,65%
3	Chàng Lúa (Paddy Guy)	"Sóc Sờ Bai Sóc Trăng" by Thanh Sơn	8,74%
4	Kim Sa Ngư (Sequin Goldfish)	"Xem như em chẳng may" by Trung Ngon	6,8%
5	Lady Mây (Lady Cloud)	"All by Myself" by Eric Carmen and Sergei Rachmaninoff	54,36%

=== Episode 2 (July 23) ===
- Guest panelist: Trúc Nhân

Performances in the second episode
#	Stage name	Song	Votes
1	ChipChip Pink	"Đi đu đưa đi" by Tiên Cookie	14,56%
2	Báo Mắt Biếc (Blue-Eyed Leopard)	"Lặng thầm" by Nguyễn Hoàng Duy	13,59%
3	O Sen (Ms. Lotus)	"Hồn hoang" by Hoàng Bảo	18,45%
4	Buffalove	"Phía sau một cô gái" by Tiên Cookie	16,50%
5	Hươu Thần (Deer God)	"Không ai hơn em đâu anh" by Hứa Kim Tuyền – "Destiny" by Đỗ Hiếu	36,90%

=== Episode 3 (July 30) ===
- Guest panelist: Hari Won

Performances in the third episode
#	Stage name	Song	Votes
1	Bướm Mặt Trăng (Moon Butterfly)	"Keep me in love" by Đỗ Hiếu	18,18%
2	Tí Nâu (Brown Mouse)	"Thích em hơi nhiều" by Wren Evans and Mew Amazing	10,10%
3	Nhím Uiza (Ouchy Hedgehog)	"Careless Whisper" by George Michael and Andrew Ridgeley	9,10%
4	Kỳ Đà Hoa (Flowered Iguana)	"Bóng mây qua thềm" by Võ Thiện Thanh	17,17%
5	Phượng Hoàng Lửa (Fire Phoenix)	"Kiếp nào có yêu nhau" by Hoài Trinh (poem) and Phạm Duy (music)	45,45%

=== Episode 4 (August 6) ===
- Guest panelist: Ngọc Sơn
- Topic: First things

Performances in the fourth episode
#	Stage name	Song	Identity	Votes (after 2 rounds)	Result
1	Phi Hành Gia Heo (Pig Astronaut)	"Bông hoa đẹp nhất" by Hà Anh, Phan Viết Tính, Nguyễn Văn Trung	Vũ	12,14% (Note: Phi Hành Gia Heo and Chàng Lúa has the same votes after 2 rounds. After the tiebreaker votes by 99 audiences, Chàng Lúa got 51,46% votes and was safe, Phi Hành Gia Heo was eliminated with 48,54% votes.)	OUT
2	Chàng Lúa (Paddy Guy)	"Canh ba" by Nguyễn Thương	Undisclosed	12,14%	RISK
3	Miêu Quý Tộc (Noble Cat)	"Tan" by Phạm Đại Minh Nhật	Undisclosed	16,50%	SAFE
4	Kim Sa Ngư (Sequin Goldfish)	"Sao cha không" by Phan Mạnh Quỳnh	Undisclosed	21,36%	SAFE
5	Lady Mây (Lady Cloud)	"Như những phút ban đầu" by Tiến Minh	Undisclosed	37,86%	SAFE

- Unmasking performance: "Bước qua nhau" by Vũ, performed by Vũ.

=== Episode 5 (August 13) ===
- Guest panelist: Trúc Nhân
- Topic: First things

Performances in the fifth episode
#	Stage name	Song	Identity	Votes (after 2 rounds)	Result
1	O Sen (Ms. Lotus)	"Chân ái" by Châu Đăng Khoa	Undisclosed	20,39%	SAFE
2	ChipChip Pink	"Làm ơn" by Trần Trung Đức	Juky San	13,11%	OUT
3	Buffalove	"Bài ngửa" by Buffalove	Undisclosed	15,05%	RISK
4	Báo Mắt Biếc (Blue-Eyed Leopard)	"Để mãi được gần anh" by Anh Quân	Undisclosed	18,93%	SAFE
5	Huơu Thần	"Ai chung tình được mãi" by Đông Thiên Đức	Undisclosed	32,52%	SAFE

- Unmasking performance: "Phải chăng em đã yêu?" by RedT, performed by Juky San.

=== Episode 6 (August 20) ===
- Guest panelist: Gil Lê
- Topic: First things

Performances in the sixth episode
#	Stage name	Song	Identity	Votes (after 2 rounds)	Result
1	Nhím Uiza	"Bước đến bên em" by Khắc Hưng	Song Luân	8,59%	OUT
2	Bướm Mặt Trăng (Moon Butterfly)	"Và ngày nào đó" by JB Lê Phương	Undisclosed	29,29%	SAFE
3	Tí Nâu (Brown Mouse)	"Duyên phận" by Thái Thịnh	Undisclosed	10,10%	RISK
4	Phượng Hoàng Lửa (Fire Phoenix)	"Hoa nở không màu" by Nguyễn Minh Cường	Undisclosed	28,79%	SAFE
5	Kỳ Đà Hoa (Flowered Iguana)	"Đừng yêu nữa, em mệt rồi" by Nguyễn Phúc Thiện – "Anh ơi ở lại" by Đạt G	Undisclosed	23,23%	SAFE

- Unmasking performance: "Đổi hạnh phúc lấy cô đơn" by Nghị Martin and Song Luân, performed by Song Luân.

=== Episode 7 (August 27) ===
- Guest panelist: Trọng Hiếu
- Topic: Love

Performances in the seventh episode
#	Stage name	Song	Identity	Votes	Result
1	Kim Sa Ngư	"Tuổi mộng mơ" by Phạm Duy	Lương Bích Hữu	11,65%	OUT
2	Chàng Lúa (Paddy Guy)	"Mong manh tình về" by Đức Trí	Undisclosed	16,5%	RISK
3	Lady Mây (Lady Cloud)	"If" by Vũ Cát Tường	Undisclosed	35,92%	SAFE
4	Miêu Quý Tộc (Noble Cat)	"Dạ vũ" by Tăng Duy Tân	Undisclosed	35,92%	SAFE

- Unmasking performance: "Em vẫn tin vào tình yêu ấy" by Tú Dưa, performed by Lương Bích Hữu.

=== Episode 8 (September 3) ===
- Guest panelist: Châu Đăng Khoa
- Topic: Love

Performances in the eighth episode
#	Stage name	Song	Identity	Votes	Result
1	Hươu Thần (Deer God)	"Yếu đuối" by Hoàng Dũng	Undisclosed	24,27%	SAFE
2	Buffalove	"Cứu vãn kịp không?" by Buffalove	Vương Anh Tú	14,56%	OUT
3	O Sen (Ms. Lotus)	"Phải lòng con gái Bến Tre" by Phan Ni Tấn (music) and Hoàng Thành (melody)	Undisclosed	15,6%	RISK
4	Báo Mắt Biếc (Blue-Eyed Leopard)	"Bước qua mùa cô đơn" by Vũ	Undisclosed	44,66%	SAFE

- Unmasking performance: "Giúp anh trả lời những câu hỏi" by Vương Anh Tú, performed by Vương Anh Tú.

=== Episode 9 (September 10) ===
- Guest panelist: Đức Phúc
- Topic: Love

Performances in the ninth episode
#	Stage name	Song	Identity	Votes	Result
1	Kỳ Đà Hoa (Flowered Iguana)	"Nàng thơ" by Hoàng Dũng	Undisclosed	11,65%	RISK
2	Bướm Mặt Trăng (Moon Butterfly)	"Buồn không thể buông" by RIN9	Trung Quân	10,68%	OUT
3	Tí Nâu (Brown Mouse)	"Việt Nam trong tôi là" by Yến Lê	Undisclosed	42,72%	SAFE
4	Phượng Hoàng Lửa (Fire Phoenix)	"Góc tối" by Nguyễn Hải Phong	Undisclosed	34,95%	SAFE

- Unmasking performance: "Dừng lại vẫn kịp lúc" by Vương Anh Tú, performed by Trung Quân.

=== Episode 10 (September 17) ===
- Guest panelists: Châu Đăng Khoa and Bảo Anh
- Topic: Another universe

Performances in the tenth episode
#	Stage name	Group	Song	Votes		Result
1	Báo Mắt Biếc (Blue-Eyed Leopard)	B	"Bên trên tầng lầu" by Tăng Duy Tân	N/A		RISK
2	Tí Nâu (Brown Mouse)	C	"Duyên mình lỡ" by Tú Dưa	48,08%		WIN
3	Miêu Quý Tộc (Noble Cat)	A	"I'm Diva" by Mew Amazing	N/A		RISK
Battle round				Identity	Votes	Result
1	Báo Mắt Biếc (Blue-Eyed Leopard)	B	"Đã hơn một lần" by Tăng Nhật Tuệ	Undisclosed	N/A	SAFE
2	Miêu Quý Tộc (Noble Cat)	A	"Đã hơn một lần" by Tăng Nhật Tuệ	Hà Nhi	N/A	OUT

- Unmasking performance: "Lâu lâu nhắc lại" by Đỗ Hoài Nam, performed by Hà Nhi.

=== Episode 11 (September 24) ===
- Guest panelists: Lê Hiếu và Phan Mạnh Quỳnh
- Topic: Party

Performances in the eleventh episode
#	Stage name	Group	Song	Votes		Result
1	Chàng Lúa (Paddy Guy)	A	"Có không giữ mất đừng tìm" by Bùi Công Nam	N/A		RISK
2	Hươu Thần (Deer God)	B	"Talk to me" by Triple D	N/A		RISK
3	Phượng Hoàng Lửa (Fire Phoenix)	C	"Nước ngoài" by Phan Mạnh Quỳnh	45,92%		WIN
Battle round				Identity	Votes	Result
1	Chàng Lúa (Paddy Guy)	A	"Rung động" by Vũ Khắc Anh	Tăng Phúc	40,00%	OUT
2	Hươu Thần	B	"Rung động" by Vũ Khắc Anh	Undisclosed	60,00%	SAFE

- Unmasking performance: "Sài Gòn yếu đuối biết dựa vào ai?" by Huỳnh Quốc Huy, performed by Tăng Phúc.

=== Episode 12 (October 1) ===
- Guest panelists: ViruSs và Hứa Kim Tuyền
- Topic: Favourites

Performances in the twelfth episode
#	Stage name	Group	Song	Votes		Result
1	Kỳ Đà Hoa (Flowered Iguana)	C	"Cảm ơn tình yêu tôi" by Phương Uyên	N/A		RISK
2	Lady Mây (Lady Cloud)	A	"Anh chưa thương em đến vậy đâu" by Hứa Kim Tuyền	N/A		RISK
3	O Sen (Ms. Lotus)	B	"Carmen – Habanera" by Georges Bizet	43,27%		WIN
Battle round				Identity	Votes	Result
1	Lady Mây (Lady Cloud)	A	"Sợ" by Châu Đăng Khoa	Undisclosed	N/A	SAFE
2	Kỳ Đà Hoa (Flowered Iguana)	C	"Sợ" by Châu Đăng Khoa	Thảo Trang	N/A	OUT

- Unmasking performance: "Ước mơ của mẹ" by Hứa Kim Tuyền, performed by Thảo Trang.

=== Episode 13 (October 8) ===
- Guest panelist: Bùi Anh Tú
- Topic: Fears

Performances in the thirteen episode
#	Stage name	Song	Identity	Votes	Result
1	Phượng Hoàng Lửa (Fire Phoenix)	"Em dạo này" by Ngọt	Undisclosed	9,62%	RISK
2	Hươu Thần (Deer God)	"Tình về nơi đâu" by Thanh Bùi and Dương Khắc Linh	Undisclosed	4,81%	RISK
3	Báo Mắt Biếc (Blue-Eyed Leopard)	"Yêu xa" by Vũ Cát Tường	Uyên Linh	3,85%	OUT
4	Tí Nâu (Brown Mouse)	"Ave Maria" by Franz Schubert	Undisclosed	19,23%	SAFE
5	Lady Mây (Lady Cloud)	"All the Man That I Need" by Dean Pitchford and Michael Gore	Undisclosed	34,62%	SAFE
6	O Sen (Ms. Lotus)	"Cho em gần anh thêm chút nữa" by Tăng Nhật Tuệ	Undisclosed	27,88%	SAFE

- Unmasking performance: "Giữa đại lộ Đông Tây" by Hứa Kim Tuyền, performed by Uyên Linh.

=== Episode 14 (October 15) ===
- Guest panelist: Mỹ Linh
- Topic: Moments

Performances in the fourteenth episode
#	Stage name	Song	Identity	Votes	Result
Special performance by guests
Sp.	Anh Cloud (Cloud Guy)	"Head in the Clouds" by Hayd	Hayd	N/A	N/A
Main performances
1	Hươu Thần (Deer God)	"Cứu lấy anh đi" by Đỗ Hiếu	Mai Tiến Dũng	5,83%	OUT
2	O Sen (Ms. Lotus)	"Túy âm" by Xesi and Hoàng Trọng Lợi (poem)	Undisclosed	8,73%	RISK
3	Lady Mây (Lady Cloud)	"Cám dỗ" by Hứa Kim Tuyền	Undisclosed	14,56%	SAFE
4	Tí Nâu (Brown Mouse)	"Lạc trôi" by Sơn Tùng M-TP	Undisclosed	28,16%	SAFE
5	Phượng Hoàng Lửa (Fire Phoenix)	"Nửa thập kỷ" by Hoàng Dũng (Note: During the performance, Phượng Hoàng Lửa accidentally dropped her mascot head. She had to put her mask back on to continue performing. To keep her identity confidential, the producer greyed out the real identity of Phượng Hoàng Lửa.)	Undisclosed	42,72%	SAFE

- Unmasking performance: "Người như anh" by Hùng Quân, performed by Mai Tiến Dũng.

=== Episode 15 – Semi-final (October 22) ===
- Guest panelist: Noo Phước Thịnh
- Topic: Ladies Night

Performances in the Semi-final episode
#	Stage name	Song	Identity	Supporter(s)	Votes	Result
Challenge (special guest performance)
Sp.	Hoàng Tử Rồng (Dragon Prince)	"Định mệnh" by Isaac Thái	Noo Phước Thịnh	—N/a	91,26% (Note: The show initially announced that Hoàng Tử Rồng would be a challenger and needs voting to advance to Top 5, but he was later revealed to be Noo Phước Thịnh and joined the panelists of this episode.)	WIN
Main performances
1	O Sen (Ms. Lotus)	"Chạm khẽ tim anh một chút thôi" by Tăng Nhật Tuệ – "Trót yêu" by Phan Lê Ái Phương	Undisclosed	O Súng (Ms. Water Lily)	15,53% (Note: Tí Nâu and O Sen both had the lowest votes in the Semi-final. According to the rules, whoever has the lowest votes is eliminated, resulting in two unmaskings in the episode. To keep them back in the show, Trấn Thành decided that all would vote once again to keep or to eliminate both Tí Nâu and O Sen. After seeking advice from everyone, Ngô Kiến Huy announced that both would go to the final. This made the first time in The Masked Singer franchise that there would be four instead of three contestants in the final.)	RISK
2	Phượng Hoàng Lửa (Fire Phoenix)	"Em không là duy nhất" by Lương Bằng Quang – "Có ai thương em như anh" của Bùi Công Nam	Undisclosed	Tiểu Phượng Hoàng (Little Phoenix)	24,27%	SAFE
3	Tí Nâu (Brown Mouse)	"Cho con được thay cha" by Yến Lê	Undisclosed	Tí Bros (Mouse Brothers) (Note: Tí Bros consists of 4 members, namely Tí Cao Nguyên (Plateau Mouse), Tí Vườn (Garden Mouse), Tí Thành Phố (City Mouse), Tí Việt Kiều (Overseas Vietnamese Mouse).)	15,53%	RISK
4	Lady Mây (Lady Cloud)	"Có người" and "Góc ban công" by Vũ Cát Tường	Undisclosed	Nàng Mây (Cloud Girl)	44,67%	SAFE

- By the rules, the accompanying mascots would be unmasked along with eliminated contestant. However, no one was eliminated in this episode, so their identities are still undisclosed as of now.

=== Episode 16 - Final (November 5) ===
- Guest panelist: Lệ Quyên

Performances in the final episode
#	Stage name	Song	Identity	Votes	Result
Special performance by guest
Sp.	Thiên Nga Đen	"Trái tim tổn thương" by Nguyễn Minh Cường	Lệ Quyên	N/A	N/A
Main performances
1	Lady Mây (Lady Cloud)	"Giữa đêm bật khóc" by Châu Đăng Khoa	Undisclosed	22,33%	RISK
2	O Sen (Ms. Lotus)	"Vũ điệu gió" by Vũ Minh Tâm	Undisclosed	31,07%	SAFE
3	Tí Nâu (Brown Mouse)	"Hơn em chỗ nào" by ViruSs	Thùy Chi	21,36%	OUT
4	Phượng Hoàng Lửa (Fire Phoenix)	"Thanh xuân" by Trần Đức Minh	Undisclosed	25,24%	SAFE

- Group performance: "Dưới ánh đèn sân khấu" by Hứa Kim Tuyền, performed by Lady Mây, O Sen, Tí Nâu and Phượng Hoàng Lửa.
- Unmasking performance: "Giấc mơ trưa" by Giáng Son (music) and Nguyễn Vĩnh Tiến (melody), performed by Thùy Chi.

=== Episode 17 – Awards ceremony (November 19 – Live) ===
- This was part of The Masked Singer Vietnam – All-star Concert event taken place on November 19, 2022.

Performances in Awards ceremony
#	Stage name	Special performance	Unmasking performance	Identity	Votes (Note: Votes are concluded from messages and app votes up until the Awards ceremony.)	Result
Special performance by guest
Sp.	Bướm Mặt Trăng (Moon Butterfly)	"Anh tự do nhưng cô đơn" by Đạt G	N/A	Trung Quân	N/A	N/A
Award ceremony
1	Lady Mây (Lady Cloud)	"Tôi đứng giữa đồng hoa" by Hứa Kim Tuyền	"Tình yêu đến sau" by Triết Phạm	Myra Trần	29% (121.421)	THIRD
2	Phượng Hoàng Lửa (Fire Phoenix)	"Tôi đứng giữa đồng hoa" by Hứa Kim Tuyền	"Mùa hè đẹp nhất" by Đức Huy	Trần Thu Hà	35% (147.013)	RUNNER-UP
3	O Sen (Ms. Lotus)	"Tôi đứng giữa đồng hoa" by Hứa Kim Tuyền	"Đi đâu cho thiếp theo cùng" by Phạm Duy	Ngọc Mai	36% (151.037)	WINNER

- Trấn Thành was revealed under the mascot "Kỵ Sĩ Nấm Hương (Mushroom Knight)" in Concert.
- O Sen got 5.070 votes by SMS and 145.967 votes by app, Lady Mây got 1.733 votes by SMS and 119.688 votes by app, Phượng Hoàng Lửa got 2.059 votes by SMS and 144.954 votes by app.

== Season 2 ==
Contestants

Results
Stage name		Celebrity	Episodes																
Stage name		Celebrity	1	2 (Note: From this episode and til Episode 6, the performances were aired on Friday and eliminations and unmaskings air on Wednesday.)	3	4	5	6	7 (Note: From this episode and onwards, the performances and unmaskings both return to airing on Friday.)	8	9	10	11	12	13	14	15	16	17
Stage name		Celebrity	Round 1			Round 2			Round 3			Round 4			Round 5	Round 6	Semi-Final	Final	Awards ceremony
B	Voi Bản Đôn (Ban Don Elephant)	Anh Tú		WIN			SAFE		SAFE			RISK			SAFE	SAFE	SAFE	SAFE	WINNER
A	Ong Bây Bi (Baby Bee) (WC)	Orange				WIN					RISK			WIN	WIN	RISK	RISK	WIN	RUNNER-UP
A	Cú Tây Bắc (Northwest Owl)	Hương Lan	SAFE			SAFE			WIN			WIN			RISK	SAFE	RISK	RISK	THIRD
A	HippoHappy	Lâm Bảo Ngọc	WIN			SAFE				WIN			RISK		RISK	WIN	WIN	OUT	
B	Bố Gấu (Papa Bear) (WC)	Hoàng Hải					RISK				WIN			RISK	SAFE	OUT			
B	Cún Tóc Lô (Pup in Hair Rollers)	Ngọc Anh		SAFE			WIN			SAFE			WIN		OUT				
C	Chuột Cherry (Cherry Mouse)	Nhật Thủy			RISK			RISK			SAFE			OUT					
C	Sứa Thủy Tinh (Glassy Jellyfish)	Phượng Vũ			SAFE			SAFE		RISK			OUT						
C	Nàng Tiên Hoa (Flower Fairy) (WC)	Dương Hoàng Yến						WIN	RISK			OUT							
A	Kỳ Lân Lãng Tử (Romantic Unicorn)	Dương Edward	RISK			RISK					OUT								
C	Thỏ Xỏ Khuyên (Pierced Rabbit)	Hoàng Dũng			WIN			SAFE		OUT									
B	Cáo Tiểu Thư (Fox Lady) (WC)	Vũ Thảo My					SAFE		OUT										
C	Tê Giác Ngộ Nghĩnh (Funky Rhino) (WC)	Châu Khải Phong						OUT											
B	Cừu Bông (Fluffy Sheep)	Khởi My		RISK			OUT												
A	Bạch Khổng Tước (White Peacock) (WC)	Hoàng Mỹ An				OUT													
C	Madame Vịt (Madame Duck)	Kháh Linh			OUT														
B	Cá Ngựa Đôi (Seahorse Twinsies)	Phạm Đình Thái Ngân		OUT															
B	Cá Ngựa Đôi (Seahorse Twinsies)	Trương Thảo Nhi		OUT															
A	Khỉ Hồng (Pink Monkey)	Ưng Hoàng Phúc	OUT																

- A The masked singer is on Group A.
- B The masked singer is on Group B.
- C The masked singer is on Group C.
- WINNER The masked singer won first place.
- RUNNER-UP The masked singer won second place.
- THIRD PLACE The masked singer won third place.
- WIN The masked singer won their respective round and moved on to the next round.
- SAFE The masked singer was safe from elimination.
- RISK The masked singer is in the group with the lowest number of votes or must participate in the Battle Round but was not eliminated.
- OUT The masked singer was eliminated from the competition and unmasked upon their elimination.
- The masked singer did not perform
- (WC) This masked singer is a wildcard contestant.

Episodes

=== Episode 1 (August 4) ===
- Guest panelist: Song Luân

Performances in the first episode
#	Stage name	Song	Results		
1	Khỉ Hồng (Pink Monkey)	"Vì anh là vậy" by Mew Amazing and Trọng Hiếu	RISK		
2	Kỳ Lân Lãng Tử (Romantic Unicorn)	"Cảm giác lúc ấy sẽ ra sao" by Only C and Hưng Cacao	RISK		
3	Cú Tây Bắc (Northwest Owl)	"Đưa em tìm động hoa vàng" by Phạm Duy (music) and Phạm Thiên Thư (poem)	SAFE		
4	HippoHappy	"Quá khứ còn lại gì" by Vũ Minh Tâm	WIN		
Battle round			Identity	Votes	Result
1	Khỉ Hồng (Pink Monkey)	"Sợ rằng em biết anh còn yêu em" by Vương Anh Tú	Ưng Hoàng Phúc	35,97%	OUT
2	Kỳ Lân Lãng Tử (Romantic Unicorn)	"Sợ rằng em biết anh còn yêu em" by Vương Anh Tú	undisclosed	64,03%	SAFE

- Unmasking performance: "Thà rằng như thế" by Nguyễn Hoài Anh, performed by Ưng Hoàng Phúc.

=== Episode 2 (August 11/16) ===
- Guest panelist: Bảo Anh

Performances in the second episode
#	Stage name	Song	Results		
1	Cừu Bông (Fluffy Sheep)	"Bước qua đời nhau" by Khắc Việt	RISK		
2	Voi Bản Đôn (Ban Don Elephant)	"Ngày mai người ta lấy chồng" by Đông Thiên Đức	WIN		
3	Cá Ngựa Đôi (Seahorse Twinsies)	"Đừng ngoảnh lại" by Lưu Hương Giang – "Để em rời xa" by Phúc Bồ	RISK		
4	Cún Tóc Lô (Pup in Hair Rollers)	"Yêu như ngày yêu cuối" by Tăng Nhật Tuệ	SAFE		
Battle round			Identity	Votes	Result
1	Cừu Bông (Fluffy Sheep)	"Tận cùng nỗi nhớ" by Andiez	undisclosed	62,59%	SAFE
2	Cá Ngựa Đôi (Seahorse Twinsies)	"Tận cùng nỗi nhớ" by Andiez	Phạm Đình Thái Ngân	37,41%	OUT
2	Cá Ngựa Đôi (Seahorse Twinsies)	"Tận cùng nỗi nhớ" by Andiez	Trương Thảo Nhi	37,41%	OUT

- Unmasking performances: "Em là lý do" by Phạm Đình Thái Ngân and "Chạy qua bao con phố" by Trương Thảo Nhi, performed by Phạm Đình Thái Ngân and Trương Thảo Nhi.

=== Episode 3 (August 18/23) ===
- Guess panelist: Rocker Nguyễn

Performances in the third episode
#	Stage name	Song	Results		
1	Madame Vịt (Madame Duck)	"Thị Mầu" by Nguyễn Hoàng Phong and Masew	RISK		
2	Thỏ Xỏ Khuyên (Pierced Rabbit)	"Khi người mình yêu khóc" by Phan Mạnh Quỳnh	WIN		
3	Chuột Cherry (Cherry Mouse)	"Em yêu anh nhiều lắm" by Sỹ Luân	RISK		
4	Sứa Thủy Tinh (Glassy Jellyfish)	"Lửng lơ" by Masew, B Ray, RedT and Ý Tiên	SAFE		
Battle round			Identity	Votes	Result
1	Madame Vịt (Madame Duck)	"Buông" by Vũ Ngọc Bích	Khánh Linh	35,97%	OUT
2	Chuột Cherry (Cherry Mouse)	"Buông" by Vũ Ngọc Bích	undisclosed	64,03%	SAFE

- Unmasking performance: "Anh cứ đi đi" by Vương Anh Tú, performed by Khánh Linh.

=== Episode 4 (August 25/30) ===
- Guest panelist: Hà Nhi
- Topic: Dream & Business

Performances in the fourth episode
#	Stage name	Song	Identity	Votes	Result
1	Kỳ Lân Lãng Tử (Romantic Unicorn)	"Tell Me Why" by Mr.A	undisclosed	13,60%	RISK
WC	Ong Bây Bi (Baby Bee)	"Giá như cô ấy chưa xuất hiện" by Vương Anh Tú	undisclosed	26,21%	WIN
2	HippoHappy	"Vùng ký ức" by Duy Khang	undisclosed	24,27%	SAFE
WC	Bạch Khổng Tước (White Peacock)	"Như lời đồn" by Khắc Hưng	Hoàng Mỹ An	11,65%	OUT
3	Cú Tây Bắc (Northwest Owl)	"Tình yêu màu nắng" by Phạm Thanh Hà	undisclosed	24,27%	SAFE

- Unmasking performance: "Bức thư cuối gửi anh" by Vũ Ngọc Bích, performed by Hoàng Mỹ An.

=== Episode 5 (September 1/6) ===
- Guest panelist: Bảo Anh
- Topic: Crazy Love

Performances in the fifth episode
#	Stage name	Song	Identity	Votes	Result
1	Voi Bản Đôn (Ban Don Elephant)	"Rời bỏ" by Vũ Huy Hoàng	undisclosed	19,42%	SAFE
2	Cừu Bông (Fluffy Sheep)	"Họ yêu ai mất rồi" by Doãn Hiếu	Khởi My	17,48%	OUT
WC	Bố Gấu (Papa Bear)	"Đã sai từ lúc đầu" by Nguyễn Minh Cường	undisclosed	18,45%	RISK
3	Cún Tóc Lô (Pup in Hair Rollers)	"Em gái mưa" by Mr. Siro	undisclosed	24,27%	WIN
WC	Cáo Tiểu Thư (Fox Lady)	"Cơn mưa ngang qua" by Sơn Tùng M-TP	undisclosed	20,39%	SAFE

- Unmasking performance: "Người yêu cũ" by Phan Mạnh Quỳnh, performed by Khởi My.

=== Episode 6 (September 15/20) ===
- Guest panelist: Vũ Cát Tường
- Topic: Milestones & Numbers

Performances in the sixth episode
#	Stage name	Song	Identity	Votes	Result
1	Chuột Cherry (Cherry Mouse)	"Bùa yêu" by Tiên Cookie, Phạm Thanh Hà and DươngK	undisclosed	12,62%	RISK
WC	Tê Giác Ngộ Nghĩnh (Funky Rhino)	"Thay tôi yêu cô ấy" by Thanh Hưng	Châu Khải Phong	11,65%	OUT
2	Thỏ Xỏ Khuyên (Pierced Rabbit)	"Em mới là người yêu anh" by Khắc Hưng	undisclosed	22,33%	SAFE
3	Sứa Thủy Tinh (Glassy Jellyfish)	"Chạm đáy nỗi đau" by Mr. Siro	undisclosed	20,39%	SAFE
WC	Nàng Tiên Hoa (Flower Fairy)	"Hối duyên" by Masew and Khôi Vũ	undisclosed	33,01%	WIN

- Unmasking performance: "Ngắm hoa lệ rơi" by Duy Cường, performed by Châu Khải Phong.

=== Episode 7 (September 22) ===
- Guest panelist: Văn Mai Hương
- Topic: Mistakes

Performances in the seventh episode
#	Stage name	Group	Song	Identity	Votes	Results
1	Cáo Tiểu Thư (Fox Lady)	B	"Không ai khác ngoài em" by Madily and Ha Kiem	Vũ Thảo My	11,65%	OUT
2	Cú Tây Bắc (Northwest Owl)	A	"Ngày xưa Hoàng Thị" by Phạm Duy (music) and Phạm Thiên Thư (poem)	undisclosed	37,86%	WIN
3	Nàng Tiên Hoa (Flower Fairy)	C	"Khôn ngoan" by Trung Ngon	undisclosed	14,56%	RISK
4	Voi Bản Đôn (Ban Don Elephant)	B	"Lỗi tại mưa" by Vicky Nhung	undisclosed	35,92%	SAFE

- Unmasking performance: "Silence" by Benjamin James, performed by Vũ Thảo My.

=== Episode 8 (September 29) ===
- Guest panelist: Nhật Thủy
- Topic: Cuisine

Performances in the eighth episode
#	Stage name	Group	Song	Identity	Votes	Results
1	Sứa Thủy Tinh (Glassy Jellyfish)	C	"Em khóc được rồi" by Mew Amazing	undisclosed	17,48%	RISK
2	Thỏ Xỏ Khuyên (Pierced Rabbit)	C	"Người con gái ta thương" by Phạm Toàn Thắng (music) and Ngô Võ Giang Trung (melody)	Hoàng Dũng	15,53%	OUT
3	HippoHappy	A	"Giữ lấy làm gì" by Grey D	undisclosed	36,89%	WIN
4	Cún Tóc Lô (Pup in Hair Rollers)	B	"Phai" by Microwave	undisclosed	30,10%	SAFE

- Unmasking performance: "Đoạn kết mới" by Hoàng Dũng, performed by Hoàng Dũng.

=== Episode 9 (October 6) ===
- Guest panelist: Đạt G
- Topic: Youth

Performances in the ninth episode
#	Stage name	Group	Song	Identity	Votes	Results
1	Ong Bây Bi (Baby Bee)	A	"Chuyện đôi ta" by Emcee L	undisclosed	22,33%	RISK
2	Bố Gấu (Papa Bear)	B	"Hoàng hôn tháng Tám" by Phạm Toàn Thắng	undisclosed	32,04%	WIN
3	Kỳ Lân Lãng Tử (Romantic Unicorn)	A	"Em hát ai nghe" by Trungg I.U	Dương Edward	18,45%	OUT
4	Chuột Cherry (Cherry Mouse)	C	"Rửa mặt đi em" by Đạt G	undisclosed	27,18%	SAFE

- Unmasking performance: "Thương em" by Khắc Việt, performed by Dương Edward.

=== Episode 10 (October 13) ===
- Guest panelist: Myra Trần
- Topic: Once Resounding

Performances in the tenth episode
#	Stage name	Group	Song	Votes		Result
1	Voi Bản Đôn (Ban Don Elephant)	B	"My Everything" by Tiên Tiên	N/A		RISK
2	Nàng Tiên Hoa (Flower Fairy)	C	"Trước khi em tồn tại" by Vũ Đình Trọng Thắng	N/A		RISK
3	Cú Tây Bắc (Northwest Owl)	A	"Buồn làm chi em ơi" by Nguyễn Minh Cường – "Dang dở" by Hồ Phi Nal	38,38%		WIN
Battle round				Identity	Votes	Result
1	Voi Bản Đôn (Ban Don Elephant)	B	"Dành cho em" by Hoàng Tôn	Undisclosed	61,87%	SAFE
2	Nàng Tiên Hoa (Flower Fairy)	C	"Dành cho em" by Hoàng Tôn	Dương Hoàng Yến	38,13%	OUT

- Unmasking performance: "Dù chỉ là" by Khắc Hưng, performed by Dương Hoàng Yến.

=== Episode 11 (October 20) ===
- Guest panelist: Khắc Hưng
- Topic: Lifetime's performances

Performances in the tenth episode
#	Stage name	Group	Song	Votes		Result
1	Cún Tóc Lô (Pup in Hair Rollers)	B	"Nỗi đau ngự trị" by Lương Bằng Quang – "Như vẫn còn đây" by Phúc Trường	39,40%		WIN
2	Sứa Thủy Tinh (Glassy Jellyfish)	C	"Khóc xong quên anh" by Trung Ngon	22,22%		RISK
3	HippoHappy	A	"Buông" by Nguyễn Duy Anh	38,38%		RISK
Battle round				Identity	Votes	Result
1	HippoHappy	A	"Những kẻ mộng mơ" by Nguyễn Bảo Trọng	Undisclosed	58,99%	SAFE
2	Sứa Thủy Tinh (Glassy Jellyfish)	C	"Những kẻ mộng mơ" by Nguyễn Bảo Trọng	Phượng Vũ	41,01%	OUT

- Unmasking Performance: "Not My Only" by Mew Amazing, performed by Phượng Vū.

=== Episode 12 (October 27) ===
- Guest panelist: Quang Dũng
- Topic: A thousand pains

Performances in the tenth episode
#	Stage name	Group	Song	Votes		Result
1	Bố Gấu (Papa Bear)	B	"Trò đùa của tạo hóa" by Nguyễn Hồng Thuận	N/A		RISK
2	Chuột Cherry (Cherry Mouse)	C	"Rồi ta sẽ ngắm pháo hoa cùng nhau" by Olew	N/A		RISK
3	Ong Bây Bi (Baby Bee)	A	"Là anh đó" by Andiez	45,45%		WIN
Battle round				Identity	Votes	Result
1	Bố Gấu (Papa Bear)	B	"Tìm" by Phạm Toàn Thắng	Undisclosed	57,55%	SAFE
2	Chuột Cherry (Cherry Mouse)	C	"Tìm" by Phạm Toàn Thắng	Nhật Thủy	42,45%	OUT

- Unmasking performance: "Gật đầu" by Đoàn Minh Quân, performed by Nhật Thủy.

=== Episode 13 (November 3) ===
- Guest panelists: Thùy Chi & Erik
- Topic: Mind-blowing memories with fans - Fantastic

Performances in the thirteen episode
#	Stage name	Song	Identity	Votes	Result
1	HippoHappy	"Chắc ai đó sẽ về" by Sơn Tùng M-TP	Undisclosed	8,74%	RISK
2	Cún Tóc Lô (Pup in Hair Rollers)	"Vỡ tan" của Trịnh Thăng Bình	Ngọc Anh	7,77%	OUT
3	Cú Tây Bắc (Northwest Owl)	"Bèo dạt mây trôi" by Dân ca Quan họ and Đặng Ngọc Long (music) – "Người ơi người ở đừng về" by Dân ca Quan họ Bắc Ninh and Xuân Tứ (melody) – "Em tôi" by Thuận Yến (music) và Xuân Trường (melody)	Undisclosed	12,62%	RISK
4	Ong Bây Bi (Baby Bee)	"Gặp lại năm ta 60" by Ong Bây Bi (duet with Erik)	Undisclosed	31,07%	WIN
5	Bố Gấu (Papa Bear)	"Vô cùng" by Võ Hoài Phúc and Huỳnh Tuấn Anh	Undisclosed	14,56%	SAFE
6	Voi Bản Đôn (Ban Don Elephant)	"Khóa ly biệt" by Đông Thiên Đức	Undisclosed	25,24%	SAFE

- Unmasking performance: "Hãy yêu khi ta còn bên nhau" by Ngọc Anh, performed by Ngọc Anh.

=== Episode 14 (November 10) ===
- Guest panelist: Hứa Kim Tuyền
- Topic: OTP - One True Pairing

Performances in the fourteenth episode
#	Stage name	Song	Identity	Votes	Result
1	Ong Bây Bi (Baby Bee)	"Ngủ một mình" by Hieuthuhai, Negav (melody) and Kewtiie (music)	Undisclosed	17,48%	RISK
2	Cú Tây Bắc (Northwest Owl)	"Gọi em là đóa hoa sầu" by Phạm Duy (music) and Phạm Thiên Thư (poem)	Undisclosed	20,29%	SAFE
3	Bố Gấu (Papa Bear)	"Có nỗi buồn ghé qua" by Nguyễn Minh Cường	Hoàng Hải	12,60%	OUT
4	Voi Bản Đôn (Ban Don Elephant)	"Duyên do trời, phận tại ta" by Voi Bản Đôn and Phan Hiếu	Undisclosed	23,30%	SAFE
5	HippoHappy	"Rồi em sẽ gặp một chàng trai khác" by Hứa Kim Tuyền	Undisclosed	26,21%	WIN

- Unmasking performance: "Nhắn gió mây rằng anh yêu em" by Đoàn Minh Vũ, performed by Hoàng Hải.

=== Episode 15 (November 17) ===
- Guest panelist: Minh Tuyết
- Topic: Convergence of quintessence

Performances in the Semi-final episode
#	Stage name	Song	Identity	Partner(s)	Votes	Result
Special performance by guest
Sp.	Dứa Minh Tinh (Star Pineapple)	"Đại Minh Tinh" by Hứa Kim Tuyền	Minh Tuyết	—N/a	—N/a	—N/a
Main performances
1	Ong Bây Bi (Baby Bee)	"Lệ lưu ly" by DT Tập Rap and Drum7 – "Cắt đôi nỗi sầu" by Tăng Duy Tân	Undisclosed	Bướm Mặt Trăng (Moon Butterfly)	23,31%	RISK
2	Voi Bản Đôn (Ban Don Elephant)	"Chắc anh đang" của Tiên Tiên – "Lời tạm biệt chưa nói" của Kai Đinh	Undisclosed	Miêu Quý Tộc (Noble Cat)	25,24%	SAFE
3	Cú Tây Bắc (Northwest Owl)	"Từ đó" by Phan Mạnh Quỳnh – "Giấc mơ trưa" by Giáng Son (music) and Nguyễn Vĩnh Tiến (poem)	Undisclosed	Tí Nâu (Brown Mouse)	24,27%	RISK
4	HippoHappy	"Ngày chưa giông bão" by Phan Mạnh Quỳnh	Undisclosed	Bố Gấu (Papa Bear)	27,18%	WIN

=== Episode 16 - Final (November 24) ===
- Guest panelist: Bằng Kiều
- Topic: I am extraordinary

Performances in the final episode
#	Stage name	Song	Identity	Votes	Result
Special performance by guest
Sp.	Ếch Ca Ca (Frog Brother)	"Nếu không vui đã là sai rồi" by Ếch Ca Ca	Bằng Kiều	N/A	N/A
Main performances
1	HippoHappy	"Nói không thành lời" by Nguyễn Hải Minh Cơ	Lâm Bảo Ngọc	20,39%	OUT
2	Cú Tây Bắc (Northwest Owl)	"Bậu ơi đừng khóc" by Hamlet Trương	Undisclosed	23,3%	RISK
3	Ong Bây Bi (Baby Bee)	"Bát cơm mặn" by Ong Bây Bi and Mew Amazing	Undisclosed	30,1%	WIN
4	Voi Bản Đôn (Ban Don Elephant)	"Đừng nên nói" by Đạt G	Undisclosed	26,21%	SAFE

- Group performance: "Tôi phi thường" by Bùi Công Nam, performed by HippoHappy, Cú Tây Bắc, Ong Bây Bi and Voi Bản Đôn.
- Unmasking performance: "Trái tim tan vỡ cũng không sao" by Tiên Cookie, performed by Lâm Bảo Ngọc.

=== Episode 17 – Awards ceremony (December 16 – Live) ===
- This was part of The Masked Singer Vietnam – All-star Concert event taken place on December 16, 2023.

Performances in Awards ceremony
#	Stage name	Special performance	Unmasking performance	Identity	Votes (Note: Votes are concluded from app votes up until the Awards ceremony.)	Result
Special performance by guest
Sp.	Tí Nâu (Brown Mouse)	"Việt Nam trong tôi là" by Yến Lê	N/A	Thùy Chi	N/A	N/A
Sp.	Lady Mây (Lady Cloud)	"Môi chạm môi" by August and Tez	N/A	Myra Trần	N/A	N/A
Award ceremony
1	Ong Bây Bi (Baby Bee)	N/A	"Có đau thì đau một mình" by Orange	Orange (Note: She's also the real identity of Tiểu Phượng Hoàng (Little Phoenix).)	30,3% (122.610)	RUNNER-UP
2	Voi Bản Đôn (Ban Don Elephant)	N/A	"Một phần hai" by August and OgeNus	Anh Tú	45,4% (183.324)	WINNER
3	Cú Tây Bắc (Northwest Owl)	N/A	"Mẹ ơi, mai con về" by Hoàng Nhất	Hương Lan	24,3% (98.219)	THIRD

- Via the VieON app, Voi Bản Đôn got 183.324 votes, Cú Tây Bắc got 98.219 votes and Ong Bây Bi got 122.610 votes.
