= Nguyễn Hoàng Hải =

Nguyễn Hoàng Hải may refer to:

- Hoàng Hải (born 1982), Vietnamese Pop/R&B singer
- Nguyễn Tất Nhiên, pen-name of Vietnamese oet Nguyễn Hoàng Hải (1952–1992) who moved to France and then the United States
- Nguyễn Hoàng Hải (badminton) (born 1986), Vietnamese badminton player
