= The Voice Kids of Vietnam season 1 =

The Voice Kids of Vietnam
- Season 1
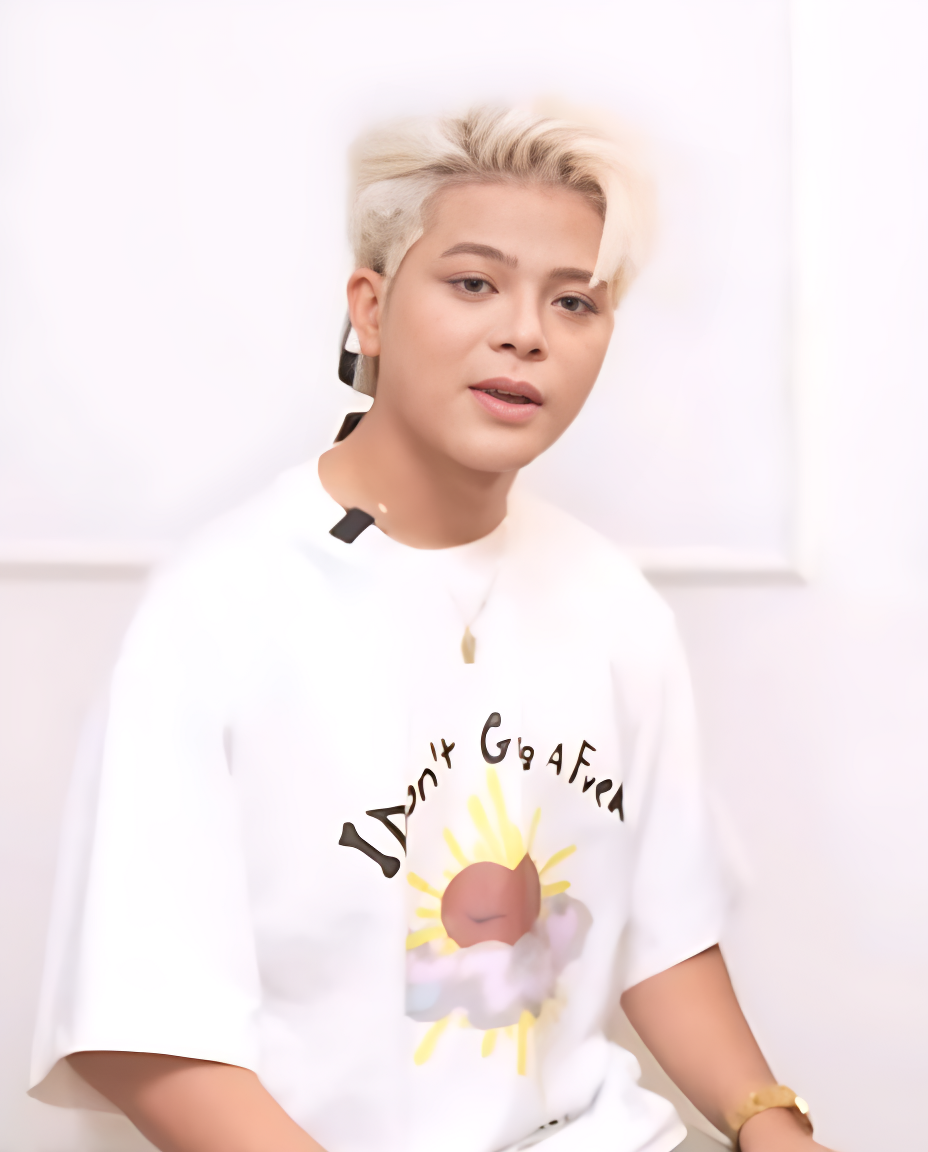
- Hosted by: Trấn Thành; Thanh Thảo
- Judges: Thanh Bùi; Lưu Hương Giang; Hồ Hoài Anh; Hiền Thục
- Winner: Nguyễn Quang Anh
- Winning coach: Lưu Hương Giang & Hồ Hoài Anh
- Runner-up: Phương Mỹ Chi

Release
- Original network: VTV3
- Original release: June 1 – September 7, 2013

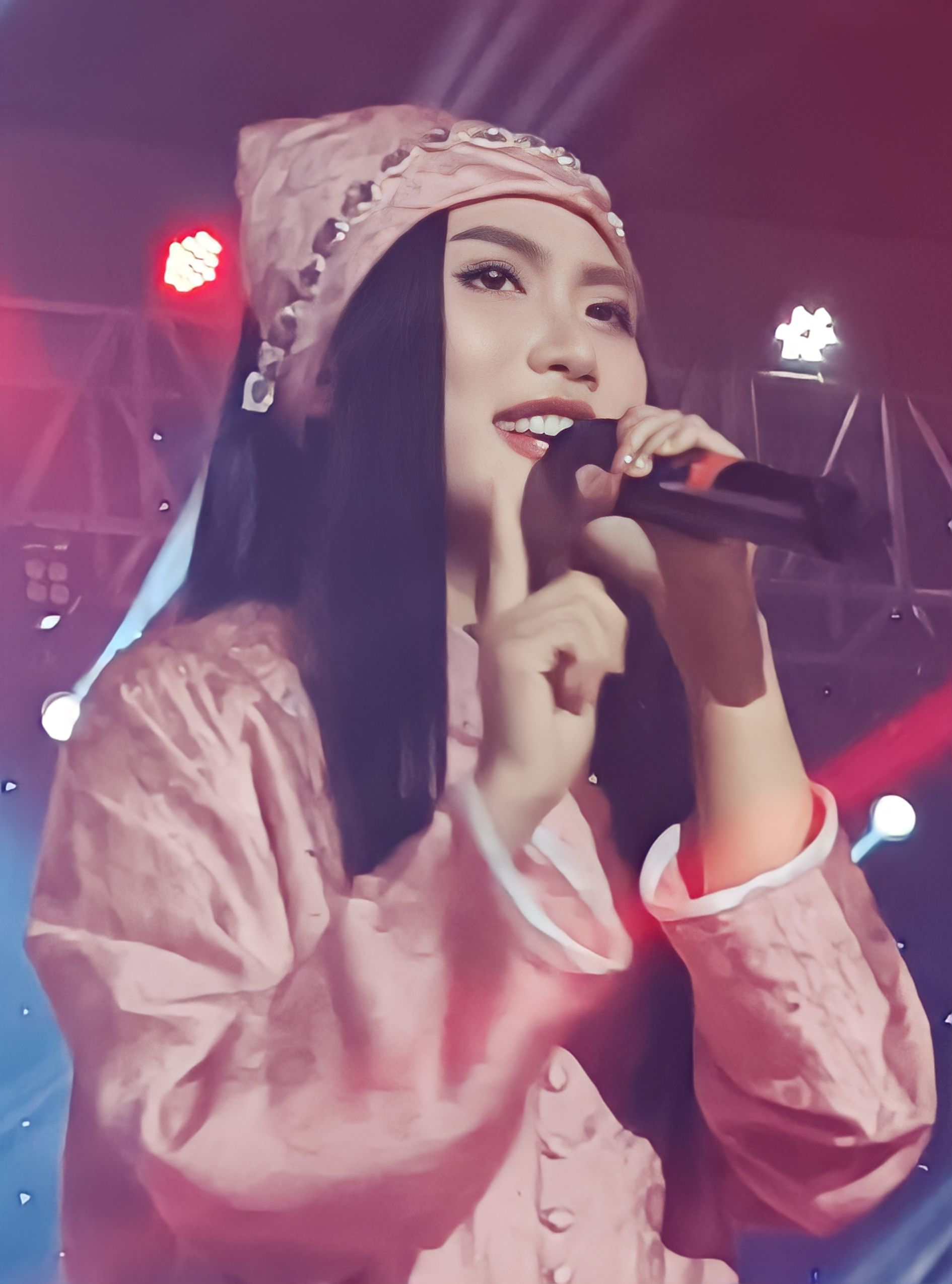
Phương Mỹ Chi, season one runner-up

The first season of The Voice Kids of Vietnam (Vietnamese: Giọng Hát Việt Nhí) began on June 1, 2013. The show is co-hosted by Trấn Thành and Thanh Thảo. The judges are Thanh Bùi, husband-and-wife duo Hồ Hoài Anh & Lưu Hương Giang, and Hiền Thục.

== Blind Auditions ==
Blind auditions take place from June 1, 2013 to June 29, 2013. Each judge will be facing away from the contestants in chairs. If they like what they hear, they can press the red "TÔI CHỌN BẠN" (I WANT YOU) button in front of them to turn around. If more than one coach turns around, the contestant must then choose which team they want to be on. If none of the judges turn around, the contestant is eliminated.

=== Episode 1: Blind Auditions, Part 1 ===
Coach presses their button	Contestant eliminated with no coach pressing their button	Contestant defaulted to this coach's team	Contestant elected to join this coach's team

Order	Contestant	Song	Coach's and Contestant's choices		
Order	Contestant	Song	Thanh Bùi	Hồ Hoài Anh & Lưu Hương Giang	Hiền Thục
1	Đỗ Trí Dũng _{10, from Yên Bái}	Rock Con Diều (Writer: Võ Thiện Thanh) - Phương Thanh ft. Minh Thuận	—		
2	Trần Chi Mai _{13, from Hanoi}	Stronger (What Doesn't Kill You) (Writers: Jörgen Elofsson, Ali Tamposi, David Gamson, Greg Kurstin) - Kelly Clarkson			—
3	Đinh Nho Khoa _{14, from Ho Chi Minh City}	Knockin' on Heaven's Door (Writer: Bob Dylan) - Bob Dylan	—	—	—
4	Đinh Nguyễn Song Khanh _{14, from Ho Chi Minh City}	That Should Be Me (Writer: Justin Bieber) - Justin Bieber	—	—	—
5	Trần Thục Quyên _{14, from Ho Chi Minh City}	A Moment Like This (Writers: Jörgen Elofsson, John Reid) - Kelly Clarkson	—	—	—
6	Nguyễn Cao Khánh _{14, from Ho Chi Minh City}	Bà Tôi (Writer: Phương Uyên) - Ngọc Khuê	—	—	
7	Lương Thùy Mai _{12, from Hanoi}	Price Tag (Writers: Jessie J, Dr. Luke, Claude Kelly, B.o.B) - Jessie J			
8	Vũ Song Vũ _{14, from Haiphong}	Biển Nhớ (Writer: Trịnh Công Sơn) - Khánh Ly		—	
9	Bùi Thị Kiều Vy _{9, from Ho Chi Minh City}	Tomorrow (Writers: Charles Strouse, Martin Charnin) - Grace Jones			
10	Phạm Thành Tuân _{15, from Đà Nẵng}	Cannonball (Writer: Damien Rice) - Damien Rice			—
11	Nguyễn Lê Nguyên _{13, from Ho Chi Minh City}	Và Ta Đã Thấy Mặt Trời (Writer: Nguyễn Cường) - Siu Black	—	—	
12	Bùi Huyền Thảo My _{12, from Ho Chi Minh City}	Set Fire to the Rain (Writers: Adele, Fraser T Smith) - Adele			

=== Episode 2: Blind Auditions, Part 2 ===
Order	Contestant	Song	Coach's and Contestant's choices		
Order	Contestant	Song	Thanh Bùi	Hồ Hoài Anh & Lưu Hương Giang	Hiền Thục
1	Cao Đức Anh _{14, from Nghệ An}	Quê Hương Tuổi Thơ Tôi (Writer: Từ Huy) - Mỹ Tâm	—	—	
2	Lê Trung Thành _{15, from Ho Chi Minh City}	Gửi Mẹ (Writer: Nhạc Ngoại) - Hằng Bing Boong		—	
3	Nguyễn Phương Duyên _{10, from Bình Định}	Bà Tôi (Writer: Nguyễn Vĩnh Tiến) - Ngọc Khuê	—	—	
4	Chiara Falcone _{10, from Đà Nẵng}	L'Italiano (Writer: Toto Cutugno) - Toto Cutugno			—
5	Nguyễn Cao Tú Uyên _{13, from Đà Nẵng}	One and Only (Writers: Adele, Dan Wilson, Greg Wells) - Adele			—
6	Nguyễn Tuấn Dũng _{14, from Hanoi}	Dòng Thời Gian (Writer: Nguyễn Hải Phong) - Nguyễn Hải Phong	—	—	—
7	Mai Xuân Bách _{14, from Bình Thuận}	Stay (Writers: Mikky Ekko, Justin Parker) - Rihanna			—
8	Nguyễn Khánh Hà _{15, from Hanoi}	Someone Like You (Writers: Adele, Dan Wilson) - Adele			
9	Huỳnh Hữu Đại _{13, from Ho Chi Minh City}	Try (Writers: busbee, Ben West) - P!nk			
10	Phương Mỹ Chi _{10, from Ho Chi Minh City}	Quê Em Mùa Nước Lũ (Writer: Tiến Luân) - Hương Lan			

=== Episode 3: Blind Auditions, Part 3 ===
Order	Contestant	Song	Coach's and Contestant's choices		
Order	Contestant	Song	Thanh Bùi	Hồ Hoài Anh & Lưu Hương Giang	Hiền Thục
1	Hồ Văn Phong _{14, from Thanh Hóa}	Cánh Diều (Writer: Ngọc Đại) - Hoàng Hải			—
2	Nguyễn Miccah _{14, from Hanoi}	Monster (Writers: Hayley Williams, Taylor York) - Paramore	—		—
3	Hà Phạm Anh Thư _{14, from Bình Dương}	Giọt Sương Và Chiếc Lá (Writer: Hồ Hoài Anh) - Lưu Hương Giang	—	—	—
4	Đỗ Thị Hồng Khanh _{9, from Hanoi}	Mamma (Writers: Cesare Andrea Bixio, Bruno Cherubini, Harold Barlow, Phil Brito) - David Whitfield			
5	Đoàn Nguyễn Bảo Trọng _{15, from Ho Chi Minh City}	Mưa Hồng (Writer: Trịnh Công Sơn) - Khánh Ly		—	
6	Nguyễn Ngọc Phương Nghi _{10, from Ho Chi Minh City}	Lời Mẹ Hát (Writer: Anh Quân) - Mỹ Linh		—	
7	Trịnh Đức Nam _{14, from Hanoi}	Diamonds (Writers: Sia Furler, Benny Blanco, Mikkel Storleer Eriksen, Tor Erik Hermansen) - Rihanna		—	—
8	Nguyễn Trần Hoàng Anh _{11, from Đắk Lắc}	Lý Kéo Chài (Writer: Dân ca Nam Bộ) - Thanh Lan		—	
9	Phạm Nguyễn Linh Lan _{12, from Ho Chi Minh City}	The Climb (Writers: Jessi Alexander, Jon Mabe) - Miley Cyrus		—	
10	Võ Thị Thu Hà _{11, from Nghệ An}	I Will Always Love You (Writer: Dolly Parton) - Whitney Houston			

=== Episode 4: Blind Auditions, Part 4 ===
Order	Contestant	Song	Coach's and Contestant's choices		
Order	Contestant	Song	Thanh Bùi	Hồ Hoài Anh & Lưu Hương Giang	Hiền Thục
1	Nguyễn Chiến Thắng _{11, from Hanoi}	Trống cơm (Writer: Dân ca Bắc Bộ) - Thanh Thảo	†	—	
2	Bùi Chang Tuyết Lan _{11, from Ho Chi Minh City}	If We Hold on Together (Writers: Diana Ross, James Horner, Will Jennings) - Diana Ross	—	—	
3	Bạch Phúc Nguyên _{9, from Thừa Thiên–Huế}	What Makes You Beautiful (Writers: Rami Yacoub, Carl Falk, Savan Kotecha) - One Direction			
4	Phạm Đức Thắng _{13, from Ho Chi Minh City}	Yoü and I (Writer: Lady Gaga) - Lady Gaga	—	—	—
5	Nguyễn Tùng Hiếu _{15, from Ho Chi Minh City}	Thu Cạn (Writer: Giáng Son) - Nguyên Thảo	—		—
6	Nguyễn Thị Yến Nhi _{13, from Đồng Nai}	Tôi Thích (Writer: Phương Uyên) - Tóc Tiên			
7	Phạm Ngọc Quỳnh Như _{14, from Ho Chi Minh City}	Mama Do (Uh Oh, Uh Oh) (Writers: Mads Hauge, Phil Thornalley) - Pixie Lott		—	—
8	Cao Ngọc Thùy Anh _{15, from Ho Chi Minh City}	As Long As You Love Me (Writers: Rodney Jerkins, Andre Lindal, Nasri, Big Sean, Justin Bieber) - Justin Bieber			
9	Tôn Chí Long _{13, from Cần Thơ}	Bay (Writer: Nguyễn Hải Phong) - Thu Minh			—
10	Nguyễn Quang Anh _{12, from Thanh Hóa}	Đám Cưới Chuột (Writers: Gạt Tàn Đầy) - Gạt Tàn Đầy			

† Hồ Hoài Anh pressed Thanh Bùi's button. However at the time, Thanh Bùi also expressed his wish to press it.

=== Episode 5: Blind Auditions, Part 5 ===
Order	Contestant	Song	Coach's and Contestant's choices		
Order	Contestant	Song	Thanh Bùi	Hồ Hoài Anh & Lưu Hương Giang	Hiền Thục
1	Bùi Quang Nhật _{10, from Thừa Thiên-Huế}	Con Cò (Writer: Lưu Hà An) - Tùng Dương	—	—	
2	Nguyễn Thảo Linh _{13, from Hanoi}	Mirrors (Writers: Justin Timberlake, Timbaland, Jerome "J-Roc" Harmon, James Fauntleroy) - Justin Timberlake		—	—
3	Nguyễn Mai Thùy Anh _{10, from Hanoi}	You Raise Me Up (Writers: Rolf Løvland, Brendan Graham) - Westlife	—	—	—
4	Lê Dương Quỳnh Anh _{12, from Ho Chi Minh City}	Wannabe (Writers: Spice Girls, Matt Rowe, Richard Stannard) - Spice Girls			
5	Lê Đoàn Phương Anh _{15, from Ho Chi Minh City}	Phố Cổ (Writer: Nguyễn Duy Hùng) - Thùy Chi		—	
6	Trần Ngọc Duy _{12, from Hải Dương}	Gặp Mẹ Trong Mơ (Writer: Lê Tự Minh) - Thùy Chi			
7	Đỗ Hoàng Dương _{14, from Hanoi}	Taxi (Writer: Nguyễn Hải Phong) - Thu Minh			
8	Trần Ông Minh Triết _{14, from Quảng Nam}	I See the Light (Writers: Alan Menken, Glenn Slater) - Mandy Moore		-	
9	Nguyễn Hải Khang _{10, from ?}	Tìm Lại (Writer: Microwave) - Microwave		-	-
10	Bùi Duy Lan Hương _{15, from Ho Chi Minh City}	If I Ain't Got You (Writer: Alicia Keys) - Alicia Keys		-	-
