= Nguyen Hoang Hai =

Nguyen Hoang Hai may refer to:

- Hoang Hai (born 1982), Vietnamese Pop/R&B singer
- Nguyen Van Hai (born c. 1950), Vietnamese dissident blogger
