= The Masked Singer Vietnam season 1 =

The Masked Singer Vietnam
- Season 1
- Starring: Trấn Thành; Tóc Tiên; Wowy; Đức Phúc
- Hosted by: Ngô Kiến Huy
- No. of contestants: 15
- Winner: Ngọc Mai as "O Sen (Ms. Lotus)"
- Runner-up: Hà Trần as "Phượng Hoàng Lửa (Fire Phoenix)"
- No. of episodes: 17

Release
- Original network: HTV2 - Vie Channel
- Original release: July 16 – November 19, 2022

Season chronology
- Next → Season 2

The first season of The Masked Singer Vietnam aired on HTV2 - Vie Channel and VieON from July 16 to November 19, 2022. The winner of this season was Ngọc Mai, a singer and vocal coach who is in the mascot "O Sen (Ms. Lotus)", while runner-up belonged to Hà Trần with the mascot "Phượng Hoàng Lửa (Fire Phoenix)" and third place belonged to Myra Trần with the mascot "Lady Mây (Lady Cloud)".

== Panelists and host ==
The panelists and host for season 1 were announced on July 6, 2022. Trấn Thành, Tóc Tiên and Wowy were the main panelists, while Ngô Kiến Huy was the host of the season. However, for some reasons, Wowy only appeared in the first two rounds, and from episode 10, Đức Phúc replaced him.

The guest panelist also appear in the show and changes in each episode, with Minh Hằng being the first guest panelist. Among the main panelists are Trấn Thành and Tóc Tiên (excluding Wowy as he wasn't present after round 2), there is also the "Golden Ears" award for the best panelist of each season. In this season, the winner is Tóc Tiên as out of 15 contestants, she correctly predicted the real identity of 7 contestants, while Trấn Thành only correctly predicted six of them.

== Contestants ==
The contestants were all announced from the beginning of July 2022. In this season, 15 contestants were divided into three groups: A, B and C. According to the show, each contestant behind the mask are celebrities, with several awards and famous singles. Besides the main contestants, in the semi-final episode, the supporting mascots also appeared to support the main mascot in their performance. Each main mascot will have one, or even a group of supporting mascots.

Results
Stage name		Celebrity	Episodes																
Stage name		Celebrity	1 (Note: No one was eliminated in this episode as this was an introductory episode.)	2	3	4	5	6	7	8	9	10	11	12	13	14	15	16	17
Stage name		Celebrity	Round 1						Round 2			Round 3			Round 4	Round 5	Semi-finals	Final	Awards ceremony
B	O Sen (Ms. Lotus)	Ngọc Mai		SAFE			SAFE			RISK				WIN	SAFE	RISK	RISK	SAFE	WINNER
C	Phượng Hoàng Lửa (Fire Phoenix)	Hà Trần			SAFE			SAFE			SAFE		WIN		RISK	SAFE	SAFE	SAFE	RUNNER-UP
A	Lady Mây (Cloud Lady)	Myra Trần	SAFE			SAFE			SAFE					RISK	SAFE	SAFE	SAFE	RISK	THIRD
C	Tí Nâu (Brown Mouse)	Thùy Chi			SAFE			RISK			SAFE	WIN			SAFE	SAFE	RISK	OUT	
B	Hươu Thần (Deer God)	Mai Tiến Dũng		SAFE			SAFE			SAFE			RISK		RISK	OUT			
B	Báo Mắt Biếc (Blue-Eyed Leopard)	Uyên Linh		SAFE			RISK			SAFE		RISK			OUT				
C	Kỳ Đà Hoa (Flowered Iguana)	Thảo Trang			SAFE			SAFE			RISK			OUT					
A	Chàng Lúa (Paddy Guy)	Tăng Phúc	SAFE			RISK			RISK				OUT						
A	Miêu Quý Tộc (Noble Cat)	Hà Nhi	SAFE			SAFE			SAFE			OUT							
C	Bướm Mặt Trăng (Moon Butterfly)	Trung Quân			SAFE			SAFE			OUT								
B	Buffalove	Vương Anh Tú		SAFE			SAFE			OUT									
A	Kim Sa Ngư (Sequin Goldfish)	Lương Bích Hữu	SAFE			SAFE			OUT										
C	Nhím Uiza (Ouchie Hedgehog)	Song Luân			SAFE			OUT											
B	ChipChip Pink	Juky San		SAFE			OUT												
A	Phi Hành Gia Heo (Pig Astronaut)	Vũ	SAFE			OUT													

- A The masked singer is on Group A.
- B The masked singer is on Group B.
- C The masked singer is on Group C.
- WINNER The masked singer won first place.
- RUNNER-UP The masked singer won second place.
- THIRD PLACE The masked singer won third place.
- WIN The masked singer won their respective round and moved on to the next round. (Note: Only applied when the contestant is the only one who doesn't have to compete in the Battle Round in Round 3.)
- SAFE The masked singer was safe from elimination.
- RISK The masked singer is in the group with the lowest number of votes or must participate in the Battle Round but wasn't eliminated.
- OUT The masked singer was eliminated from the competition and unmasked upon their elimination.
- The masked singer did not perform.

== Episodes ==
=== Episode 1 (July 16) ===
- Guest panelist: Minh Hằng
- References:
- Opening performance: "Behind The Mask" by Châu Đăng Khoa, performed by Sofia and Red.

Performances in the first episode
#	Stage name	Song	Votes
1	Miêu Quý Tộc (Noble Cat)	"Tâm sự cùng người lạ" by Tiên Cookie	18,45%
2	Phi Hành Gia Heo (Pig Astronaut)	"Vài lần đón đưa" by Trần Lê	11,65%
3	Chàng Lúa (Paddy Guy)	"Sóc Sờ Bai Sóc Trăng" by Thanh Sơn	8,74%
4	Kim Sa Ngư (Sequin Goldfish)	"Xem như em chẳng may" by Trung Ngon	6,8%
5	Lady Mây (Lady Cloud)	"All by Myself" by Eric Carmen and Sergei Rachmaninoff	54,36%

=== Episode 2 (July 23) ===
- Guest panelist: Trúc Nhân

Performances in the second episode
#	Stage name	Song	Votes
1	ChipChip Pink	"Đi đu đưa đi" by Tiên Cookie	14,56%
2	Báo Mắt Biếc (Blue-Eyed Leopard)	"Lặng thầm" by Nguyễn Hoàng Duy	13,59%
3	O Sen (Ms. Lotus)	"Hồn hoang" by Hoàng Bảo	18,45%
4	Buffalove	"Phía sau một cô gái" by Tiên Cookie	16,50%
5	Hươu Thần (Deer God)	"Không ai hơn em đâu anh" by Hứa Kim Tuyền – "Destiny" by Đỗ Hiếu	36,90%

=== Episode 3 (July 30) ===
- Guest panelist: Hari Won

Performances in the third episode
#	Stage name	Song	Votes
1	Bướm Mặt Trăng (Moon Butterfly)	"Keep me in love" by Đỗ Hiếu	18,18%
2	Tí Nâu (Brown Mouse)	"Thích em hơi nhiều" by Wren Evans and Mew Amazing	10,10%
3	Nhím Uiza (Ouchy Hedgehog)	"Careless Whisper" by George Michael and Andrew Ridgeley	9,10%
4	Kỳ Đà Hoa (Flowered Iguana)	"Bóng mây qua thềm" by Võ Thiện Thanh	17,17%
5	Phượng Hoàng Lửa (Fire Phoenix)	"Kiếp nào có yêu nhau" by Hoài Trinh (poem) and Phạm Duy (music)	45,45%

=== Episode 4 (August 6) ===
- Guest panelist: Ngọc Sơn
- Topic: First things

Performances in the fourth episode
#	Stage name	Song	Identity	Votes (after 2 rounds)	Result
1	Phi Hành Gia Heo (Pig Astronaut)	"Bông hoa đẹp nhất" by Hà Anh, Phan Viết Tính, Nguyễn Văn Trung	Vũ	12,14% (Note: Phi Hành Gia Heo and Chàng Lúa has the same votes after 2 rounds. After the tiebreaker votes by 99 audiences, Chàng Lúa got 51,46% votes and was safe, Phi Hành Gia Heo was eliminated with 48,54% votes.)	OUT
2	Chàng Lúa (Paddy Guy)	"Canh ba" by Nguyễn Thương	Undisclosed	12,14%	RISK
3	Miêu Quý Tộc (Noble Cat)	"Tan" by Phạm Đại Minh Nhật	Undisclosed	16,50%	SAFE
4	Kim Sa Ngư (Sequin Goldfish)	"Sao cha không" by Phan Mạnh Quỳnh	Undisclosed	21,36%	SAFE
5	Lady Mây (Lady Cloud)	"Như những phút ban đầu" by Tiến Minh	Undisclosed	37,86%	SAFE

- Unmasking performance: "Bước qua nhau" by Vũ, performed by Vũ.

=== Episode 5 (August 13) ===
- Guest panelist: Trúc Nhân
- Topic: First things

Performances in the fifth episode
#	Stage name	Song	Identity	Votes (after 2 rounds)	Result
1	O Sen (Ms. Lotus)	"Chân ái" by Châu Đăng Khoa	Undisclosed	20,39%	SAFE
2	ChipChip Pink	"Làm ơn" by Trần Trung Đức	Juky San	13,11%	OUT
3	Buffalove	"Bài ngửa" by Buffalove	Undisclosed	15,05%	RISK
4	Báo Mắt Biếc (Blue-Eyed Leopard)	"Để mãi được gần anh" by Anh Quân	Undisclosed	18,93%	SAFE
5	Huơu Thần	"Ai chung tình được mãi" by Đông Thiên Đức	Undisclosed	32,52%	SAFE

- Unmasking performance: "Phải chăng em đã yêu?" by RedT, performed by Juky San.

=== Episode 6 (August 20) ===
- Guest panelist: Gil Lê
- Topic: First things

Performances in the sixth episode
#	Stage name	Song	Identity	Votes (after 2 rounds)	Result
1	Nhím Uiza	"Bước đến bên em" by Khắc Hưng	Song Luân	8,59%	OUT
2	Bướm Mặt Trăng (Moon Butterfly)	"Và ngày nào đó" by JB Lê Phương	Undisclosed	29,29%	SAFE
3	Tí Nâu (Brown Mouse)	"Duyên phận" by Thái Thịnh	Undisclosed	10,10%	RISK
4	Phượng Hoàng Lửa (Fire Phoenix)	"Hoa nở không màu" by Nguyễn Minh Cường	Undisclosed	28,79%	SAFE
5	Kỳ Đà Hoa (Flowered Iguana)	"Đừng yêu nữa, em mệt rồi" by Nguyễn Phúc Thiện – "Anh ơi ở lại" by Đạt G	Undisclosed	23,23%	SAFE

- Unmasking performance: "Đổi hạnh phúc lấy cô đơn" by Nghị Martin and Song Luân, performed by Song Luân.

=== Episode 7 (August 27) ===
- Guest panelist: Trọng Hiếu
- Topic: Love

Performances in the seventh episode
#	Stage name	Song	Identity	Votes	Result
1	Kim Sa Ngư	"Tuổi mộng mơ" by Phạm Duy	Lương Bích Hữu	11,65%	OUT
2	Chàng Lúa (Paddy Guy)	"Mong manh tình về" by Đức Trí	Undisclosed	16,5%	RISK
3	Lady Mây (Lady Cloud)	"If" by Vũ Cát Tường	Undisclosed	35,92%	SAFE
4	Miêu Quý Tộc (Noble Cat)	"Dạ vũ" by Tăng Duy Tân	Undisclosed	35,92%	SAFE

- Unmasking performance: "Em vẫn tin vào tình yêu ấy" by Tú Dưa, performed by Lương Bích Hữu.

=== Episode 8 (September 3) ===
- Guest panelist: Châu Đăng Khoa
- Topic: Love

Performances in the eighth episode
#	Stage name	Song	Identity	Votes	Result
1	Hươu Thần (Deer God)	"Yếu đuối" by Hoàng Dũng	Undisclosed	24,27%	SAFE
2	Buffalove	"Cứu vãn kịp không?" by Buffalove	Vương Anh Tú	14,56%	OUT
3	O Sen (Ms. Lotus)	"Phải lòng con gái Bến Tre" by Phan Ni Tấn (music) and Hoàng Thành (melody)	Undisclosed	15,6%	RISK
4	Báo Mắt Biếc (Blue-Eyed Leopard)	"Bước qua mùa cô đơn" by Vũ	Undisclosed	44,66%	SAFE

- Unmasking performance: "Giúp anh trả lời những câu hỏi" by Vương Anh Tú, performed by Vương Anh Tú.

=== Episode 9 (September 10) ===
- Guest panelist: Đức Phúc
- Topic: Love

Performances in the ninth episode
#	Stage name	Song	Identity	Votes	Result
1	Kỳ Đà Hoa (Flowered Iguana)	"Nàng thơ" by Hoàng Dũng	Undisclosed	11,65%	RISK
2	Bướm Mặt Trăng (Moon Butterfly)	"Buồn không thể buông" by RIN9	Trung Quân	10,68%	OUT
3	Tí Nâu (Brown Mouse)	"Việt Nam trong tôi là" by Yến Lê	Undisclosed	42,72%	SAFE
4	Phượng Hoàng Lửa (Fire Phoenix)	"Góc tối" by Nguyễn Hải Phong	Undisclosed	34,95%	SAFE

- Unmasking performance: "Dừng lại vẫn kịp lúc" by Vương Anh Tú, performed by Trung Quân.

=== Episode 10 (September 17) ===
- Guest panelists: Châu Đăng Khoa and Bảo Anh
- Topic: Another universe

Performances in the tenth episode
#	Stage name	Group	Song	Votes		Result
1	Báo Mắt Biếc (Blue-Eyed Leopard)	B	"Bên trên tầng lầu" by Tăng Duy Tân	N/A		RISK
2	Tí Nâu (Brown Mouse)	C	"Duyên mình lỡ" by Tú Dưa	48,08%		WIN
3	Miêu Quý Tộc (Noble Cat)	A	"I'm Diva" by Mew Amazing	N/A		RISK
Battle round				Identity	Votes	Result
1	Báo Mắt Biếc (Blue-Eyed Leopard)	B	"Đã hơn một lần" by Tăng Nhật Tuệ	Undisclosed	N/A	SAFE
2	Miêu Quý Tộc (Noble Cat)	A	"Đã hơn một lần" by Tăng Nhật Tuệ	Hà Nhi	N/A	OUT

- Unmasking performance: "Lâu lâu nhắc lại" by Đỗ Hoài Nam, performed by Hà Nhi.

=== Episode 11 (September 24) ===
- Guest panelists: Lê Hiếu và Phan Mạnh Quỳnh
- Topic: Party

Performances in the eleventh episode
#	Stage name	Group	Song	Votes		Result
1	Chàng Lúa (Paddy Guy)	A	"Có không giữ mất đừng tìm" by Bùi Công Nam	N/A		RISK
2	Hươu Thần (Deer God)	B	"Talk to me" by Triple D	N/A		RISK
3	Phượng Hoàng Lửa (Fire Phoenix)	C	"Nước ngoài" by Phan Mạnh Quỳnh	45,92%		WIN
Battle round				Identity	Votes	Result
1	Chàng Lúa (Paddy Guy)	A	"Rung động" by Vũ Khắc Anh	Tăng Phúc	40,00%	OUT
2	Hươu Thần	B	"Rung động" by Vũ Khắc Anh	Undisclosed	60,00%	SAFE

- Unmasking performance: "Sài Gòn yếu đuối biết dựa vào ai?" by Huỳnh Quốc Huy, performed by Tăng Phúc.

=== Episode 12 (October 1) ===
- Guest panelists: ViruSs và Hứa Kim Tuyền
- Topic: Favourites

Performances in the twelfth episode
#	Stage name	Group	Song	Votes		Result
1	Kỳ Đà Hoa (Flowered Iguana)	C	"Cảm ơn tình yêu tôi" by Phương Uyên	N/A		RISK
2	Lady Mây (Lady Cloud)	A	"Anh chưa thương em đến vậy đâu" by Hứa Kim Tuyền	N/A		RISK
3	O Sen (Ms. Lotus)	B	"Carmen – Habanera" by Georges Bizet	43,27%		WIN
Battle round				Identity	Votes	Result
1	Lady Mây (Lady Cloud)	A	"Sợ" by Châu Đăng Khoa	Undisclosed	N/A	SAFE
2	Kỳ Đà Hoa (Flowered Iguana)	C	"Sợ" by Châu Đăng Khoa	Thảo Trang	N/A	OUT

- Unmasking performance: "Ước mơ của mẹ" by Hứa Kim Tuyền, performed by Thảo Trang.

=== Episode 13 (October 8) ===
- Guest panelist: Bùi Anh Tú
- Topic: Fears

Performances in the thirteen episode
#	Stage name	Song	Identity	Votes	Result
1	Phượng Hoàng Lửa (Fire Phoenix)	"Em dạo này" by Ngọt	Undisclosed	9,62%	RISK
2	Hươu Thần (Deer God)	"Tình về nơi đâu" by Thanh Bùi and Dương Khắc Linh	Undisclosed	4,81%	RISK
3	Báo Mắt Biếc (Blue-Eyed Leopard)	"Yêu xa" by Vũ Cát Tường	Uyên Linh	3,85%	OUT
4	Tí Nâu (Brown Mouse)	"Ave Maria" by Franz Schubert	Undisclosed	19,23%	SAFE
5	Lady Mây (Lady Cloud)	"All the Man That I Need" by Dean Pitchford and Michael Gore	Undisclosed	34,62%	SAFE
6	O Sen (Ms. Lotus)	"Cho em gần anh thêm chút nữa" by Tăng Nhật Tuệ	Undisclosed	27,88%	SAFE

- Unmasking performance: "Giữa đại lộ Đông Tây" by Hứa Kim Tuyền, performed by Uyên Linh.

=== Episode 14 (October 15) ===
- Guest panelist: Mỹ Linh
- Topic: Moments

Performances in the fourteenth episode
#	Stage name	Song	Identity	Votes	Result
Special performance by guests
Sp.	Anh Cloud (Cloud Guy)	"Head in the Clouds" by Hayd	Hayd	N/A	N/A
Main performances
1	Hươu Thần (Deer God)	"Cứu lấy anh đi" by Đỗ Hiếu	Mai Tiến Dũng	5,83%	OUT
2	O Sen (Ms. Lotus)	"Túy âm" by Xesi and Hoàng Trọng Lợi (poem)	Undisclosed	8,73%	RISK
3	Lady Mây (Lady Cloud)	"Cám dỗ" by Hứa Kim Tuyền	Undisclosed	14,56%	SAFE
4	Tí Nâu (Brown Mouse)	"Lạc trôi" by Sơn Tùng M-TP	Undisclosed	28,16%	SAFE
5	Phượng Hoàng Lửa (Fire Phoenix)	"Nửa thập kỷ" by Hoàng Dũng (Note: During the performance, Phượng Hoàng Lửa accidentally dropped her mascot head. She had to put her mask back on to continue performing. To keep her identity confidential, the producer greyed out the real identity of Phượng Hoàng Lửa.)	Undisclosed	42,72%	SAFE

- Unmasking performance: "Người như anh" by Hùng Quân, performed by Mai Tiến Dũng.

=== Episode 15 – Semi-final (October 22) ===
- Guest panelist: Noo Phước Thịnh
- Topic: Ladies Night

Performances in the Semi-final episode
#	Stage name	Song	Identity	Supporter(s)	Votes	Result
Challenge (special guest performance)
Sp.	Hoàng Tử Rồng (Dragon Prince)	"Định mệnh" by Isaac Thái	Noo Phước Thịnh	—N/a	91,26% (Note: The show initially announced that Hoàng Tử Rồng would be a challenger and needs voting to advance to Top 5, but he was later revealed to be Noo Phước Thịnh and joined the panelists of this episode.)	WIN
Main performances
1	O Sen (Ms. Lotus)	"Chạm khẽ tim anh một chút thôi" by Tăng Nhật Tuệ – "Trót yêu" by Phan Lê Ái Phương	Undisclosed	O Súng (Ms. Water Lily)	15,53% (Note: Tí Nâu and O Sen both had the lowest votes in the Semi-final. According to the rules, whoever has the lowest votes is eliminated, resulting in two unmaskings in the episode. To keep them back in the show, Trấn Thành decided that all would vote once again to keep or to eliminate both Tí Nâu and O Sen. After seeking advice from everyone, Ngô Kiến Huy announced that both would go to the final. This made the first time in The Masked Singer franchise that there would be four instead of three contestants in the final.)	RISK
2	Phượng Hoàng Lửa (Fire Phoenix)	"Em không là duy nhất" by Lương Bằng Quang – "Có ai thương em như anh" của Bùi Công Nam	Undisclosed	Tiểu Phượng Hoàng (Little Phoenix)	24,27%	SAFE
3	Tí Nâu (Brown Mouse)	"Cho con được thay cha" by Yến Lê	Undisclosed	Tí Bros (Mouse Brothers) (Note: Tí Bros consists of 4 members, namely Tí Cao Nguyên (Plateau Mouse), Tí Vườn (Garden Mouse), Tí Thành Phố (City Mouse), Tí Việt Kiều (Overseas Vietnamese Mouse).)	15,53%	RISK
4	Lady Mây (Lady Cloud)	"Có người" and "Góc ban công" by Vũ Cát Tường	Undisclosed	Nàng Mây (Cloud Girl)	44,67%	SAFE

- By the rules, the accompanying mascots would be unmasked along with eliminated contestant. However, no one was eliminated in this episode, so their identities are still undisclosed as of now.

=== Episode 16 - Final (November 5) ===
- Guest panelist: Lệ Quyên

Performances in the final episode
#	Stage name	Song	Identity	Votes	Result
Special performance by guest
Sp.	Thiên Nga Đen	"Trái tim tổn thương" by Nguyễn Minh Cường	Lệ Quyên	N/A	N/A
Main performances
1	Lady Mây (Lady Cloud)	"Giữa đêm bật khóc" by Châu Đăng Khoa	Undisclosed	22,33%	RISK
2	O Sen (Ms. Lotus)	"Vũ điệu gió" by Vũ Minh Tâm	Undisclosed	31,07%	SAFE
3	Tí Nâu (Brown Mouse)	"Hơn em chỗ nào" by ViruSs	Thùy Chi	21,36%	OUT
4	Phượng Hoàng Lửa (Fire Phoenix)	"Thanh xuân" by Trần Đức Minh	Undisclosed	25,24%	SAFE

- Group performance: "Dưới ánh đèn sân khấu" by Hứa Kim Tuyền, performed by Lady Mây, O Sen, Tí Nâu and Phượng Hoàng Lửa.
- Unmasking performance: "Giấc mơ trưa" by Giáng Son (music) and Nguyễn Vĩnh Tiến (melody), performed by Thùy Chi.

=== Episode 17 – Awards ceremony (November 19 – Live) ===
- This was part of The Masked Singer Vietnam – All-star Concert event taken place on November 19, 2022.

Performances in Awards ceremony
#	Stage name	Special performance	Unmasking performance	Identity	Votes (Note: Votes are concluded from messages and app votes up until the Awards ceremony.)	Result
Special performance by guest
Sp.	Bướm Mặt Trăng (Moon Butterfly)	"Anh tự do nhưng cô đơn" by Đạt G	N/A	Trung Quân	N/A	N/A
Award ceremony
1	Lady Mây (Lady Cloud)	"Tôi đứng giữa đồng hoa" by Hứa Kim Tuyền	"Tình yêu đến sau" by Triết Phạm	Myra Trần	29% (121.421)	THIRD
2	Phượng Hoàng Lửa (Fire Phoenix)	"Tôi đứng giữa đồng hoa" by Hứa Kim Tuyền	"Mùa hè đẹp nhất" by Đức Huy	Trần Thu Hà	35% (147.013)	RUNNER-UP
3	O Sen (Ms. Lotus)	"Tôi đứng giữa đồng hoa" by Hứa Kim Tuyền	"Đi đâu cho thiếp theo cùng" by Phạm Duy	Ngọc Mai	36% (151.037)	WINNER

- Trấn Thành was revealed under the mascot "Kỵ Sĩ Nấm Hương (Mushroom Knight)" in Concert.
- O Sen got 5.070 votes by SMS and 145.967 votes by app, Lady Mây got 1.733 votes by SMS and 119.688 votes by app, Phượng Hoàng Lửa got 2.059 votes by SMS and 144.954 votes by app.
