= Juky San =

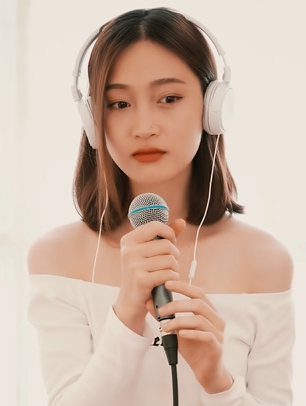
- Juky San in 2019
- Born: Trần Thị Dung; 14 January 1998 (age 28); Thai Binh, Vietnam
- Occupation: Singer-songwriter
- Years active: 2019–
- Musical career
- Origin: Ho Chi Minh City, Vietnam
- Genres: V-pop; ballad; dance-pop; R&B
- Instrument: Vocals

Trần Thị Dung, known professionally as Juky San (born 14 January 1998), is a Vietnamese singer-songwriter.

She participated in season 6 of The Voice Vietnam (2019). Belonged to Huynh Hoai Anh's team. Stopped in the final Top 7. Before participating in TV shows, Juky San was known for her covers of songs such as "Cau hon", "Yeu em dai kho", and "Em ngay nay". After the cover, she started releasing official songs. San also participated in season 1 of The Masked Singer Vietnam with her character as Chip Chip Pink. In 2025, Juky San joined the TV show Em xinh "say hi".

== Discography ==
=== Singles ===
- "Lễ Nhà, Hội Ta" (2020)
- "Có Một Người Từng Là Tất Cả" (2020)
- "Phải Chăng Em Đã Yêu" (2021)
- "Bởi Vì Yêu" (2021)
- "Khóc Cười" (2021)
- "Mùa Thu Cho Em" (2022)
- "Bản Giao Hưởng Mùa Đông" (2022)
- "Em Là Coffee" (2023)
- "Nghĩ Đến Anh" (2024)
- "Người Đầu Tiên" (2025)

=== Extended plays ===
- Symphonies (2022)
- Chia Tay (2024)

== Life and career ==
=== 1998–2020: Before fame and The Voice Vietnam ===
Juky San was born on January 14, 1998 in Thai Binh with the birth name Tran Thi Dung, and has two younger sisters. She and her family had to move constantly, starting with moving to Cam Ranh, Khanh Hoa when she was six years old. A year later, her family moved again to Duc Trong district, Lam Dong province to live and own a curtain making shop there. After graduating from high school, Juky San went to Ho Chi Minh City to study at Military Medical College 2 specializing in dental nursing, and after graduation worked as a dental assistant for a clinic in the city for a while.

While she loves singing, Juky San did not receive any formal music training, nor did anyone in her family pursue an artistic career. All her singing experience came from school art competitions. She and some friends formed a group that produced cover videos of popular songs and uploaded them to social media. In 2019, San successfully attracted attention from the online community when she performed the song "Cầu hôn" by singer Văn Mai Hương, and won the cover competition organized by Văn Mai Hương herself. Taking advantage of this popularity, she collaborated with Helia to create her first song titled "Yêu rồi đấy".

In the same year, Juky San entered the sixth season of The Voice Vietnam television competition. Initially, she was rejected by the judges in the audition round due to her limited vocal skills. When the audition video was released on social media, she received a very positive reception from some viewers and thus earned the right to enter the main filming round. After her performance in the blind audition round, San was chosen to join coach Tuan Hung's team, and when the male singer continued to recruit more members even though he had already filled the required number, she had to leave the team to ensure the lineup and later became a member of Ho Hoai Anh's team. In the end, the female singer stopped at the semi-final round with a position in the top 7.

Emerging from The Voice Vietnam, Juky San released personal products including "There's Someone Somewhere in the City", "Family Festival, Our Gathering" and "Brother" in collaboration with Thinh Suy. She was chosen by musician Duc Tri to perform the theme song for the movie Secret of the Wind, "The Wind Comes". In 2020, Juky San released the series Youthful Smile, a collection of Chinese movie soundtracks adapted into Vietnamese lyrics and re-performed by her with completely new musical arrangements. The songs in the project attracted tens of millions of views on YouTube and contributing to the singer receiving a silver button for her personal YouTube channel within one month. San said that she does not intend to develop in the long-term direction of cover songs because she still wants to have works with her own mark. During the latter half of the year, she left her management company and began working as an independent singer.

=== 2021–2024: "Phải chăng em đã yêu?" and follow-up projects ===
On February 12, 2021, Juky San released a new single in collaboration with musician RedT, "Phải chăng em đã yêu?", marking her first product since separating to pursue a solo career. The song has a gentle feel, true to Juky San's style, and tells the story of a girl's sweet unrequited love for someone who makes her heart flutter. While it was an unplanned song for the female singer and the production process was rushed, after its release, "Have I Fallen in Love?" became a phenomenon during Valentine's Day and Lunar New Year, reaching number 3 on YouTube's trending tab with over 13 million views after almost a month. The song earned the female singer a nomination at the 24th Green Wave Awards, in the "Outstanding New Face" category.

In March, Juky San participated in the music program "La Lam A Nha" and was fortunate enough to be paired with male singer Dan Truong for a duet of the song "Thien Ha Huu Tinh Nhan" – a song from her project "Thanh Xuan Nhat Tieu" last year based on the theme song of the Chinese TV series "The Condor Heroes". The coincidental combination of two singers with Vietnamese lyrics to Chinese songs, along with the harmony in their performance, created an effect for the performance. The video of the performance extracted from the program attracted more than 10 million views and topped the trending chart of YouTube Vietnam. After "La Lam A Nha", the two continued to collaborate to make a music video (MV) for "Thien Ha Huu Tinh Nhan", released on April 17. In addition, San contributed her voice to the song "Tho" by the male group Da LAB.

On November 25, Juky San introduced her debut song "Because of Love," written during the social distancing period due to the COVID-19 pandemic, and continued to be true to her youthful, cheerful image. The next song, "Crying and Laughing," was released on her birthday, January 14, 2022, marking a change in style towards a more individualistic and charming direction as she first tried her hand at R&B music and dance. In 2022, San collaborated with singer Hoang Dung and musician Hua Kim Tuyen for the first time to create the song "Friendship that Thousands Love" to promote the campaign of the same name for the ZaloPay brand. She was one of the 15 anonymous artists participating in the first season of The Masked Singer Vietnam and was behind the mascot ChipChip Pink, and was eliminated in the first round. After this program, she released the extended play (EP) Symphonies: Juky San No.22 in early November, which included four songs representing the four seasons of the year, with classical music influences based on "love for Mozart, Chopin and Pachelbel"; including the only new song in the entire EP, "Winter Symphony". In addition, Juky San also participated in the EP project GenZ and Trinh inspired by the two films Trinh Cong Son and Em and Trinh,[8] and together with Hoang Duyen remade the song "Xe dap oi" from the album celebrating the 25th anniversary of the Lan Song Xanh music award.

In 2023, she returned with the new single "You Are Coffee," along with her first music video filmed in a single take (one-shot). Following this video, she went on to make another version, an "introverted" version of "You Are Coffee" in August and a dance version of "There's Someone Somewhere in the City" in December, also in one-shot format. In 2024, San released the EP "Farewell" in collaboration with producer 2pillz. The EP included three songs all written by her: "Rush In," "Last Message," and "Don't Pick Up Your Phone," with "Rush In" chosen as the lead single for the EP accompanied by its own music video.

=== 2025–: Breakthrough with "Người đầu tiên" and Deeply in Love ===
In May 2025, Juky San was confirmed as one of the 30 female artists participating in the first season of the reality music television show Em xinh "say hi". Her journey in the competition was not very smooth, as she was often in the lower group after each round, being eliminated before the final night, and later won a spot to return to the show and made it to the final round, where she finished in the top 16 overall. There, she performed her self-composed song "The First Person" - a ballad about loneliness and separation in love. Outside of the program, San performed two other versions of "The First One" in collaboration with buitruonglinh and Lamoon, both with an anime flavor. Both versions contributed to increasing the reach of the main song by achieving number 1 on domestic digital music platforms, and reaching number 1 on both Billboard Vietnam Top Vietnamese Songs and Official Vietnam Chart.

On January 12, 2026, Juky San released her debut studio album, Đẫm tình, to mark six years of professional activity. The album includes 11 songs featuring the vocals of rappers Liu Grace, Dao Tu A1J, and Negav, capturing different emotional stages of love from infatuation, happiness to separation, hurt, and growth. Among these, the song "Let's Forget the Pain Together," a collaboration with Liu Grace, was chosen as the lead single for the album, released four days earlier.
