= Nguyễn Tất Nhiên =

Vietnamese poet

- Born: Nguyễn Hoàng Hải; 30.May 1952; Biên Hòa
- Died: 3.August 1998; California
- Known for: Poetry

Nguyễn Hoàng Hải, pen name Nguyễn Tất Nhiên (30 May 1952 in Biên Hòa – 3 August 1992 in California), was a Vietnamese poet. In 1980, he emigrated first to France, and then to Orange County.

== Published works ==
- Nàng thơ trong mắt 1966
- Dấu mưa qua đất 1968
- Thiên Tai 1970
