= Hương Lan =

Vietnamese singer (born 1956)

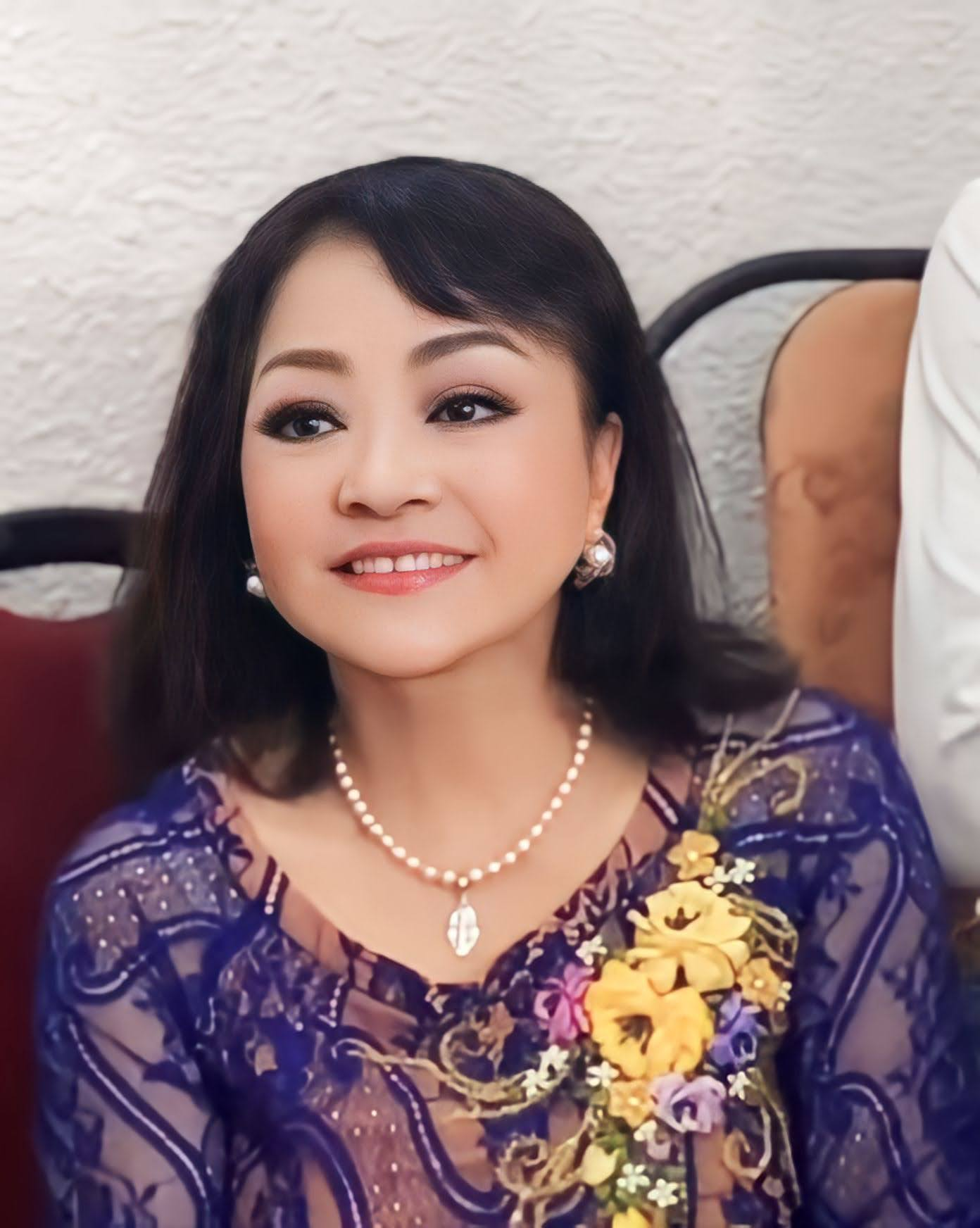
- Born: Trần Thị Ngọc Ánh; May 9, 1956 (age 70); Saigon, South Vietnam
- Occupation: Singer
- Relatives: Hương Thanh (sister)

Hương Lan, real name Trần Thị Ngọc Ánh (Saigon, 1956) is a Vietnamese popular singer.

== Early life ==
The eldest of five children, she moved to France in 1978 and has since been linked to artist Hữu Phước.

== Personal life ==
She got married for the first time in late 1975 with her co-star Chí Tâm. However, in 1982, the two divorced while settling in France. The two have two sons together: Henry Bảo Duong (born 1977) and Patrick Bảo Duong (born 1978).

In early 1986, at the birthday party of singer Elvis Phương, she met Mr. Đặng Quốc Toàn, an aeronautical mechanical engineer. The two fell in love and officially got married in 1988. Mr. Toan had three children of his own before going back to live with her.

She is considered by artist Hoài Linh as a sister because she has guided him since the very beginning of his artistic career in the US.
