= Vo Hoai Phuc =

Vietnamese composer (born 1982)

Võ Hoài Phúc
- Born: Võ Đại Hoài Phúc; December 7, 1982 (age 42); Vietnam
- Occupation(s): songwriter, producer, music director, trainer

Võ Hoài Phúc (Võ Đại Hoài Phúc) is a Vietnamese composer who turned to the professional career of music when being a second-year student of physics, Pedagogy University, HCMC.

Until now he has many songs popularized in Vietnam and abroad (Thuy Nga Paris by night), of which the most famous is “Hoang mang” bringing him the Favorite Musician Award 2007 [Lan Song Xanh – Voice of HCMC]

Being the youngest child in a family with 7 brothers and sisters, Vo Hoai Phuc is musician Hoai An's brother.

== Summary ==
Graduating in advanced composing course – HCMC Music Association, from 2005 Vo Hoai Phuc worked for Ben Thanh Audio & Video Co. as an editor. He joined to edit and implement many music performances, CDs and cassette records.

He joined the Music Content Team as an editor at Zing News (2006–2008); Sóng Nhạc, Pops.vn (2008–2009) and Go.vn (2010–2011).

From 2011 Vo Hoai Phuc has been Director of Viet Artists company focus on Digital Music Copyright, Music Composing (for TVC, TV shows, Film, Game...), Event & Entertainment Show, Media Production, Artists Management and Performing Arts Academy.

Vo Hoai Phuctook part in shows:

- Executive Producer - Cửu Long Hội Ngộ (2006)
- Judge - BeU Honda (2010, 2012, 2013)
- Executive Producer - Dòng Thời Gian (2015)
- Music Director - Larue Tình Bạn Mãi Mãi (2016)

== Songs ==
Vo Hoai Phuc's popular songs:

- Hoang mang
- Khi cô đơn em nhớ ai
- Hai thế giới
- Ngày mai em rời xa
- Một đời em đã yêu
- Gọi tên ngày mới
- Phút cuối
- Yêu không hối hận

...
