= Hoàng Hải =

Vietnamese Pop/R&B singer (born 1982)

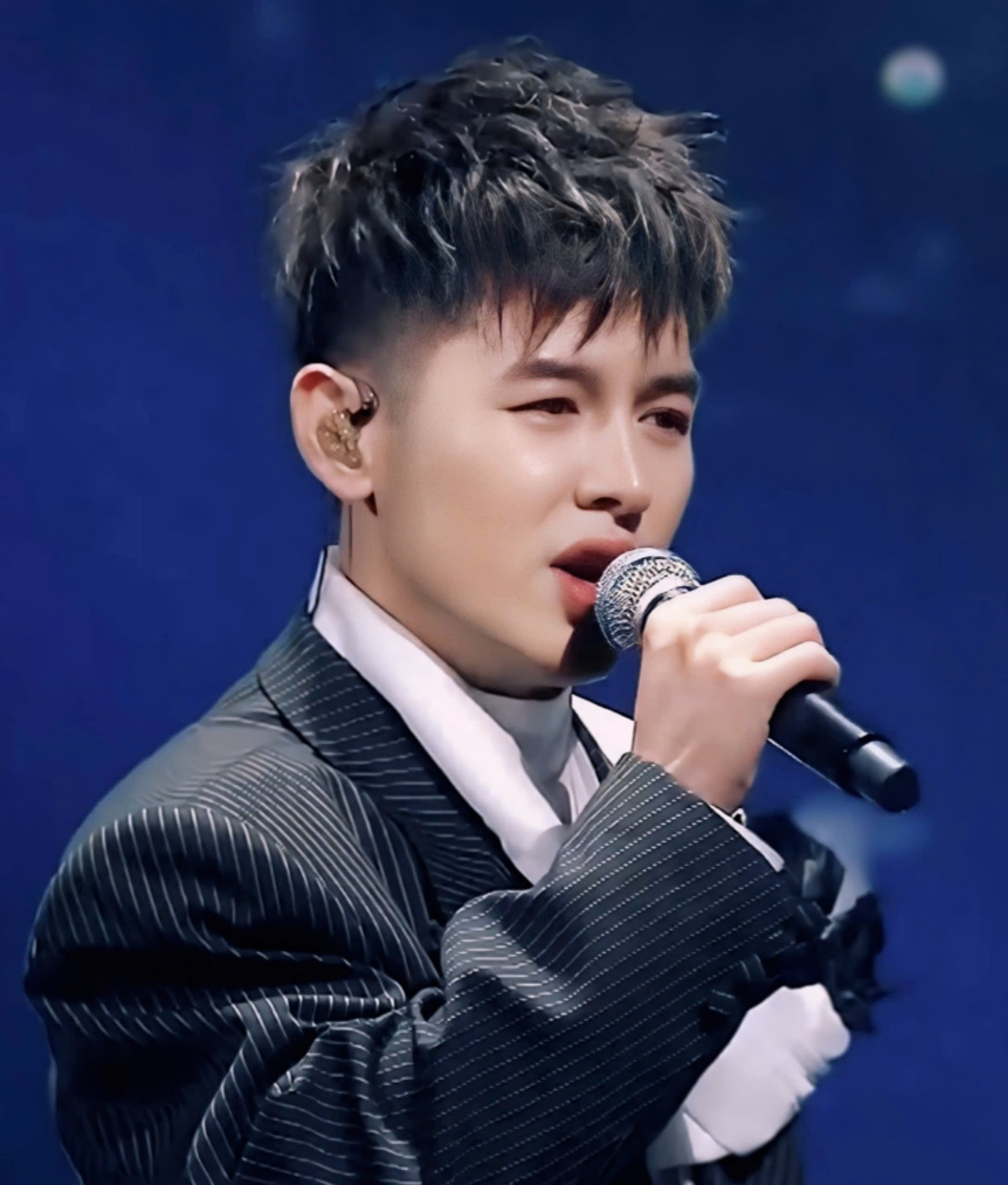
- Hoàng Hải in 2024

Background information
- Also known as: Hoàng tử V-Pop & R&B
- Born: Nguyễn Hoàng Hải; April 30, 1982 (age 44)
- Origin: Hanoi, Vietnam
- Genres: Pop, R&B, Rock, Classical
- Instruments: Vocals
- Years active: 1999 - present
- Label: H2 Productions

Nguyễn Hoàng Hải (born April 30, 1982) is a Vietnamese Pop/R&B singer. He won the contest Sao Mai Điểm Hẹn in 2006 and since then has risen to his current fame.

== Biography ==
Hoàng Hải was a member of the band Tình Bạn, which also includes his friend and current manager Nguyễn Minh Sơn and also Lương Ngọc Châu, the one who has composed songs exclusively for Hải's vocal range.
