= Lyhan =

Vietnamese singer-songwriter (born 1999)

- Born: Trần Thị Thảo Linh (Note: This is the full name Lyhan was known by when participating in the show The Debut in 2018. Most news sources do not include the word "Thị" when referring to her original name.)
- Years active: 2018–present
- Musical career
- Origin: Thành phố Hồ Chí Minh, Việt Nam
- Genres: V-pop; pop rock; slowcore; ballad
- Instrument: Vocals
- Label: Universal Music Vietnam

Trần Thị Thảo Linh (born 14 April 1999), known professionally as Lyhan (stylized as LyHan or LYHAN), is a Vietnamese singer-songwriter. After entering the music scene through the Vietnamese television show The Debut and collaborating with several artists in the industry, she officially debuted under the Universal Music Vietnam label in November 2024 with the song "Nhân danh tình yêu."

Lyhan became more widely known after finishing as runner-up in the first season of the reality television show Em xinh "say hi" in 2025, followed by the release of her debut studio album Tâm linh in the same year. She was the winner of the "Most Popular Female Singer/Rapper" award at the 28th Làn Sóng Xanh Awards.

== Life and career ==
=== 1999–2024: Early life and before debut ===
Lyhan was born Trần Thị Thảo Linh on 14 April 1999, in Thanh Hóa. Her mother is a beauty specialist who owns a small shop in Taiwan, China, and she has a younger brother. Her parents separated when she was very young; her mother later went through two other marriages that also ended in divorces. Having shown a passion for music from a young age, Lyhan moved to Ho Chi Minh City in late 2017 to attend Thanh Bùi's Soul Music & Performing Arts Academy (SMPAA).

In 2018, Lyhan made her first public appearance when she signed up for the TV show Project No. 1 – The Debut, but she was eliminated in the very first round due to her limited vocal abilities. Following this competition, she joined BarryB and Nalo to provide vocals for the track "Show Me Your Love" by producer CM1X, released in December 2018. In July 2019, Lyhan auditioned for a soon-to-debut girl group managed by Quyen Linh called O2O Girl Band but failed to make the official lineup. She subsequently formed a separate group called Saigon Sweet Girls with three other members—Alice, CheeZz, and Lily—at the end of the year. In 2021, she was featured in Hoang Ton's song "Tình yêu ngủ quên," which garnered 1.5 million views on YouTube and became a popular trend on TikTok at the time. That same year, she also acted in the music videos for "Yêu sắc yếu" by Osad and "Candy" by Duong Domic. Lyhan was one of the artists featured on indie singer-songwriter Hooligan's album Epic in 2023, performing on the track "Em không thể làm những điều bất thường với những người bình thường (Epic Love)."

Lyhan is a social media content creator. She frequently posts cover videos, transformation clips, and dance performances—either solo or in collaboration with others—on her personal TikTok channel.

=== 2024–present: "Nhân danh tình yêu", Em xinh "say hi", Tâm linh and breakthrough ===
On 5 October 2024, Lyhan released the song "A New Harley Quinn" to coincide with the official theatrical release of Joker: Folie à Deux, drawing attention and curiosity from audiences regarding the singer's identity. The Vietnamese version of the track, titled "Nhân danh tình yêu," was released later on November 11, marking her official debut as an exclusive artist under Universal Music Vietnam. In the accompanying music video, Lyhan reveals her identity through a primary black-and-white color scheme, symbolizing the suffering and pain of a toxic relationship, while also making extensive use of choreography.

In May 2025, Lyhan was announced as one of the 30 female artists participating in the first season of the music reality show Em xinh "say hi". After finishing as the runner-up, she announced the release of her debut studio album titled Tâm linh on 11 November 2025, marking the one-year anniversary of her official debut. The album consists of 8 tracks heavily influenced by sadcore combined with pop rock, R&B, and ballads, arranged sequentially to tell an internal story of the conflicting emotions she experienced, her transformation, and her own journey of self-healing.

== Discography ==
=== Album ===
- Tâm linh (2025)

=== Singles ===
==== As lead artist ====
| Year | Title | Album | Ref |
|---|---|---|---|
| 2018 | "Show Me Your Love" (with BarryB, Nalo, CM1X) | Non-album singles | |
| 2018 | "Last Xmas" (with CM1X, Nalo, BC, Bò) | Non-album singles | |
| 2019 | "Overnite" (with Freaky, CM1X) | Non-album singles | |
| 2019 | "Sao cô ấy không yêu tôi" (with Freaky, CM1X) | Non-album singles | |
| 2019 | "Điều chưa nói" | Non-album singles | |
| 2024 | "A New Harley Quinn" | Non-album singles | |
| 2024 | "Nhân danh tình yêu" | Tâm linh | |
| 2025 | "Welcome Home" | Tâm linh | |
| 2025 | "The Real Aura" (with 30 em xinh) | From Em xinh "say hi" | |
| 2025 | "AAA" (with Liên quân 2) | From Em xinh "say hi" | |
| 2025 | "Run" (with Châu Bùi, Yeolan, 52Hz, Ánh Sáng AZA) | From Em xinh "say hi" | |
| 2025 | "Em chỉ là" (with Bích Phương, Hoàng Duyên, Muộii ft. Tăng Duy Tân) | From Em xinh "say hi" | |
| 2025 | "Not My Fault" (with Mỹ Mỹ, Liu Grace, MaiQuinn) | From Em xinh "say hi" | |
| 2025 | "Lắm lúc" (with Tiên Tiên, Miu Lê, Bảo Anh, MaiQuinn) | From Em xinh "say hi" | |
| 2025 | "Tín hiệu yêu" (with Tiên Tiên, Miu Lê, Bảo Anh, MaiQuinn) | From Em xinh "say hi" | |
| 2025 | "Rơi tự do"‡ | Tâm linh | |
| 2025 | "Hourglass" (with Châu Bùi, Juky San, Saabirose) | From Em xinh "say hi" | |
| 2025 | "Việt Nam hơn từng ngày" (with 30 em xinh) | From Em xinh "say hi" | |
| 2025 | "Best of Luck" (with Bích Phương, Orange, Phương Mỹ Chi, Lamoon) | From Em xinh "say hi" | |

==== As featured artist ====
| Year | Title | Ref |
|---|---|---|
| 2019 | "Reborn" (CM1X ft. Lyhan) | |
| 2021 | "Tình yêu ngủ quên" (Hoàng Tôn ft. Lyhan) | |
| 2022 | "Ngã ba" (Osad ft. Lyhan) | |

== Filmography ==
=== Music videos ===
| Year | Title | Artists | Role | Notes |
|---|---|---|---|---|
| 2021 | "Yêu sắc yếu" | Osad | Acting | |
| 2021 | "Candy" | Dương Domic, Microdot | Acting | |
| 2025 | "Cảm ơn, cảm ơn" | Ngô Lan Hương | Cameo | |
| 2025 | "Vào một ngày khác" | Muộii | Cameo | |

=== TV shows ===
| Year | Title | Role | Network | Notes |
|---|---|---|---|---|
| 2018 | Dự án số 1 – The Debut | Contestant | VTV3 | |
| 2025 | Em xinh "say hi" | Contestant | HTV2 | |
| 2026 | Sóng 26 | Performer | HTV2 | |

== Awards and nominations ==
=== Awards ===
| Year | Award | Category | Nomination | Result | Ref |
|---|---|---|---|---|---|
| 2025 | L'Officiel Beauty Choice Awards | Best Beauty Transformation (Female) | Lyhan | Won | |
| 2025 | Harper’s Bazaar Star Awards | Best New Artist (Pop) | Lyhan | Won | |
| 2025 | WeYoung | Rising Artist | Lyhan | Nominated | |
| 2025 | Làn Sóng Xanh | Best New Artist | Lyhan | Nominated | |
| 2025 | Làn Sóng Xanh | Most Favorite Female Singer/Rapper | Lyhan | Won | |
| 2025 | WeChoice Awards | Rising Artist | Lyhan | Nominated | |
| 2026 | SR Fashion Awards | Most Stylish Female Singer of the Year | Lyhan | | |

=== Achievements ===
- Finished as the runner-up and made the "Best 5" lineup in Em xinh "say hi" 2025.
