= Lâm Bảo Ngọc =

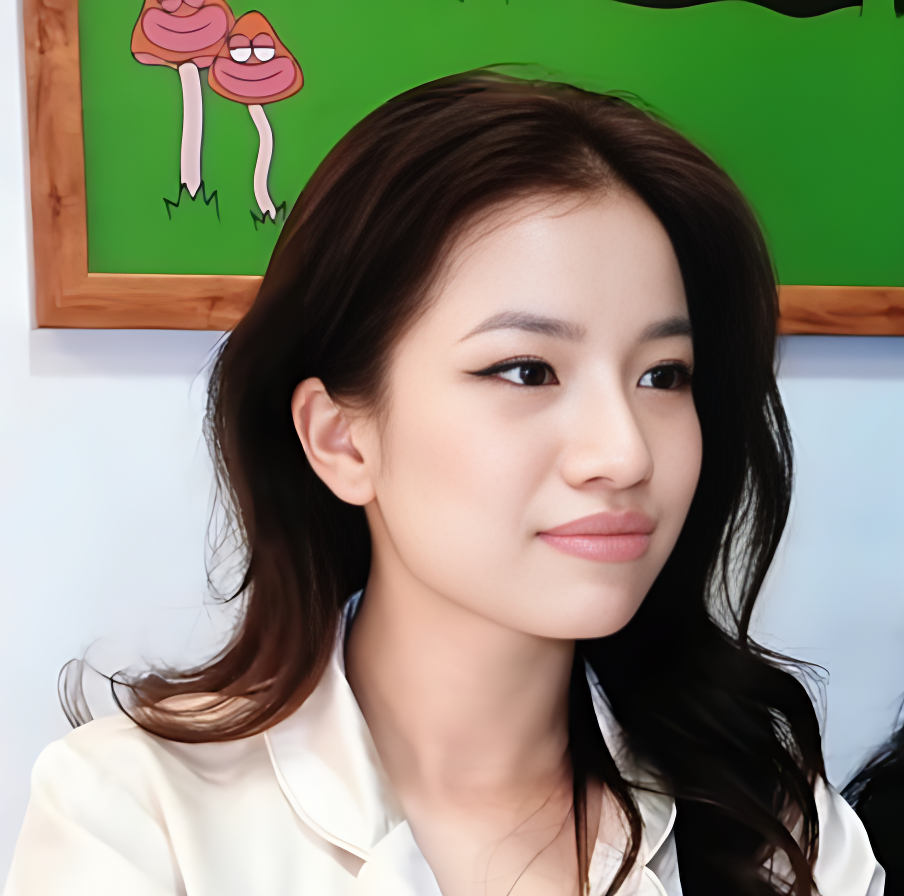
- Ngọc in 2024

Background information
- Born: Lâm Bảo Ngọc; August 17, 1996 (age 30); Nam Dinh, Vietnam
- Genres: V-pop; dance-pop; R&B; ballad
- Occupation: Singer
- Instrument: Vocal
- Years active: 2017–

Lâm Bảo Ngọc (born 17 August 1996) is a Vietnamese singer. She is first known for finishing as runner-up in Sao Mai 2017 and The Voice of Vietnam in 2019. In 2023, she participated in The Masked Singer Vietnam as "HippoHappy" and finished in fourth place.

== Early life ==
Lâm Bảo Ngọc was born on 17 August, 1996 in a family with an artistic tradition in Nam Định. She is the second child in a family of three sisters, with her father and mother being music teachers at elementary and middle schools.

Starting to show her singing talent at the age of three, Ngọc actively participated in singing competitions locally and beyond during her school years. After graduating from high school, she achieved the highest entrance exam score at both Hanoi College of Arts (majoring in Dance Performance) and the Military University of Culture and Arts (majoring in Music Pedagogy). She then decided to enroll in the military university After winning the runner-up prize at the Sao Mai competition in 2017, she was directly admitted to the H37 military system Intermediate Vocal Music class of the school.

== Singles ==
=== As lead artist ===
Year	Title	Ref.
2020	"#142"	
2020	"Cười lên Việt Nam"	
2021	"Mong trở về"	
2021	"Thanh xuân này có nhau" (với Mars)	
2022	"Ngày hát tình ca" (với Lê Hồng Phi)	
2023	"Giá như con còn cha"	
2024	"Không phẩy tám phần trăm" (với Vương Anh Tú)	
2024	"Hành trình của lá" (với PiaLinh, Minh Cà Ri)	
2024	"Giáng sinh em phiêu" (với Hoàng Mỹ An)	
2025	"Tình yêu buông tha cho chúng ta" (với Trungg I.U)	
2025	"I'm Sorry"	
2025	"Vì ai mà khóc" (với Nguyễn Minh Cường)	
2025	"Kiếp sau vẫn là người Việt Nam" (với Quốc Thiên, Dương Hoàng Yến, Quân A.P)	

==== From Em xinh "say hi" ====
Year	Title	Ref.
2025	"The Real Aura" (with 30 Em xinh "say hi" contestants)	
2025	"AAA" (with Liên quân 2)	
2025	"Từng" (with Lyly, Han Sara, Liu Grace, Danmy)	
2025	"Gã săn cá" (with MaiQuinn, Quỳnh Anh Shyn, Saabirose ft. Quang Hùng MasterD)	
2025	"Quả chín quá" (with Đào Tử A1J, 52Hz, Pháo)	
2025	"Bad Liar" (with Phương Mỹ Chi, Pháo, Liu Grace, Saabirose)	
2025	"Duyên" (with Phương Mỹ Chi, Pháo, Liu Grace, Saabirose)	
2025	"Ái kỷ"	
2025	"Tadida" (with Bích Phương, 52Hz, Bảo Anh)	
2025	"Việt Nam hơn từng ngày" (with 30 Em xinh "say hi" contestants)	
