= Em xinh "say hi" season 1 =

2025 Vietnamese television series

Em xinh "say hi"
- Season 1
- Hosted by: Trấn Thành
- No. of contestants: 30
- Winner: Phương Mỹ Chi
- Runner-up: Lyhan
- No. of episodes: 14

Release
- Original network: HTV2 - Vie Channel; ON Vie Giải Trí; VieON
- Original release: May 31 – August 23, 2025

The first season of Em xinh "say hi" was aired on HTV2 - Vie Channel, ON Vie Giải Trí, VieON app and on the "Vie Channel" YouTube channel from 31 May to 23 August 2025. The main theme for this season is "The Real Aura".

At the finale of the season, 5 em xinh with the most votes for the finale formed the girl group, "Em xinh Best 5". The final lineup for the group are: Phương Mỹ Chi, Lyhan, Bích Phương, Orange and Lamoon, with Phương Mỹ Chi being the winner and Lyhan being the runner-up.

== Production history ==
At the finale of the first season of Anh trai "say hi", the producers teased the show's female version, titled Em xinh "say hi". The show's premiere date was said to be in April 2025, according to the producers at the fourth concert of Anh trai "say hi" 2024. However, on 19 March 2025, the producers have confirmed the show's actual premiere date, being 31 May 2025, one month later than the original plan. The main producers of the show, introduced on 1 April 2025, are the same people who helped to create the success of Anh trai "say hi", including: Trấn Thành as host, JustaTee (introduced as "Jexxica Thanh Tú") as the music director, Vương Khang as the stage director and Kye Nguyễn as the fashion director.

The official press conference and fan-meeting was organized at Thiso Mall, Ho Chi Minh City in the afternoon of May 14, 2025, with the appearance of 28 out of 30 cast members. Similar to the show's male version, all of the songs being performed are completely original with the help of over 20 songwriters and music producers. The teaser of the show's theme song "The Real Aura" was premiered on the same day, with the official release of the song and its music video exactly two weeks later, at May 28, 2025.

== Contestants ==
Em xinh "say hi" consists of 30 female artists (dubbed as "em xinh") working in multiple fields. Each em xinh is defined as "idols" who not only have attractive figures and talent, but also possessing the "aura" - a term - defined by the producers - commonly used to describe a person who are not being confined to a singular identity, constantly evolve and change, but still retain their own colors.

The contestants go through the process of music making, practice to prepare for performances and go through challenges to improve their "Real Aura": Presence, Magnetism, Identity, Adaptability and Impact. The show's stated goal is to find a new generation of Vietnamese idols that possess the "Real Aura", and are ready to get through challenges and experiment in the arts while maintaining the traditional values of Vietnamese women. The winners would have the opportunity to be in a girl group.

The list below include the cast members that was announced on 2 May 2025. In the cast of 30 "em xinh", Bảo Anh appeared on the first season of the Vietnamese version of Sisters Who Make Waves, a show with a similar format, before quitting for personal reason.

Em xinh	Occupation	Year of birth	Final result
Phương Mỹ Chi	Singer-songwriter	2003	WINNER
Lyhan	Singer-songwriter	1999	RUNNER-UP
Bích Phương	Singer	1989	BEST 5
Orange	Singer-songwriter	1997	BEST 5
Lamoon	Singer-songwriter/Actress	2003	BEST 5
Phương Ly	Singer	1990	TOP 10
Miu Lê	Singer/Actress	1991	TOP 10
Lâm Bảo Ngọc	Singer	1996	TOP 10
52Hz	Singer-songwriter	1999	TOP 10
Pháo (Note: Pháo is referred as "Pháo Northside" on the show)	Singer-songwriter/Rapper	2003	TOP 10
Tiên Tiên	Singer-songwriter	1991	TOP 16
Bảo Anh	Singer/Actress	1992	TOP 16
Châu Bùi	Model/Fashionista	1997	TOP 16
MaiQuinn	Singer-songwriter	1998	TOP 16
Juky San	Singer-songwriter	1998	TOP 16
Saabirose	Singer-songwriter/Rapper	2002	TOP 16
Mỹ Mỹ	Singer/Dancer	1996	ELIMINATED (Livestage 4)
Quỳnh Anh Shyn	Model/Fashionista/Actress	1996	ELIMINATED (Livestage 4)
Liu Grace	Rapper	1997	ELIMINATED (Livestage 4)
Vũ Thảo My	Singer	1997	ELIMINATED (Livestage 4)
Tao Yi A1J (Note: Tao Yi A1J is referred as "Đào Tử A1J" on the show)	Singer-songwriter/Rapper	1999	ELIMINATED (Livestage 3)
Han Sara	Singer	2000	ELIMINATED (Livestage 3)
Muộii	Singer-songwriter	2002	ELIMINATED (Livestage 3)
Ánh Sáng AZA	Singer-songwriter	2006	ELIMINATED (Livestage 3)
Lyly	Singer-songwriter	1996	ELIMINATED (Livestage 2)
Ngô Lan Hương	Singer-songwriter	1998	ELIMINATED (Livestage 2)
Yeolan	Singer/Model	1998	ELIMINATED (Livestage 2)
Chi Xê	Singer-songwriter	1999	ELIMINATED (Livestage 2)
Hoàng Duyên	Singer	1999	ELIMINATED (Livestage 2)
Danmy	Singer-songwriter/Rapper	2003	ELIMINATED (Livestage 2)

== Guests ==
Guests	Occupation	Year of birth	Roles	Episodes appearance
Nguyễn Đình Mạnh	Actor	1994	Quiet room waiter (episode 1), school discipline monitor (episode 9)	1, 9
Trần Quốc Anh	Actor	1998	Quiet room waiter	1
Lê Dương Bảo Lâm	Actor/Comedian	1989	Butler	3
JSOL	Singer	1997	Guest artist in the "Red Flag" performance	3, 4, 5
Quang Hùng MasterD	Singer-songwriter/Music producer	1997	Guest artist in the "Gã săn cá" (Fisherman) performance	3, 4, 5
WEAN	Singer-songwriter/Actor/Rapper	1998	Guest artist in the "Hề" (Funny) performance	3, 4, 5
Gemini Hùng Huỳnh	Singer/Dancer/Model	1999	Guest artist in the "Điều em luôn mong muốn" (What I really want) performance	3, 4, 5
Dương Domic	Singer-songwriter	2000	Guest artist in the "We belong together" performance	3, 4, 5
Negav	Singer-songwriter/Rapper	2001	Guest artist in the "Perfect" performance	3, 4, 5
Pháp Kiều	Singer-songwriter/Rapper	2001	Guest artist in the "Không đau nữa rồi" (No more pain) performance	3, 4, 5
Tăng Duy Tân	Singer-songwriter	1995	Guest artist in the "Em chỉ là" (I'm just) performance	4, 5
Rùa	Dancer/Choreographer	1989	Dance battle judges	8
Phan Hiển	Dancer/Choreographer	1993	Dance battle judges	8
C2Low	Dancer/Choreographer	1995	Dance battle judges	8
Sơn Lâm	Dancer/Choreographer	1995	Dance battle judges	8
Phước Lee	Dancer/B-boy	1995	Dance battle judges	8
Thunder	Actor/Dancer	1997	School discipline monitor	9
Ngô Lan Hương	Singer-songwriter	1998	Guest appearance in the "Tín hiệu yêu" (Love sign) performance	10
Yeolan	Singer/Model	1998	Guest appearance in the "Tín hiệu yêu" (Love sign) performance	10
Chi Xê	Singer-songwriter	1999	Guest appearance in the "Tín hiệu yêu" (Love sign) performance	10
Hoàng Duyên	Singer	1999	Guest appearance in the "Tín hiệu yêu" (Love sign) performance	10
Muộii	Singer-songwriter	2002	Guest appearance in the "Tín hiệu yêu" (Love sign) performance	10
Ánh Sáng AZA	Singer-songwriter	2006	Guest appearance in the "Tín hiệu yêu" (Love sign) performance Guest appearance in the "Live my way" performance	10, 13
Phúc Du	Rapper	1996	Guest feature in the "Cô ấy không yêu anh" (She doesn't love you) performance	12

== Program's content ==
=== Livestage 1 ===
Prior to stepping in the main room, all of the cast have to participate in a game. Each "em xinh" were given 100 points and can choose between two rooms: "Quiet" room to purchase amenities or "Active" room to do challenges and gain points to purchase amenities. During the waiting for all 30 "em xinh" to join the main room, there are challenges for the contestants that entered previously, announced through secret phone calls. After all of the cast's entrance, a randomizer occurred, where the whole cast switch seats with each other to determine the team (which are based on the label behind the seat number's sign). Based on the label, six teams were formed: team "The moon hugs the sun" (Châu Bùi, Yeolan, Lyhan, 52Hz, Ánh Sáng AZA); team "Diamond" (Phương Mỹ Chi, MaiQuinn, Bích Phương, Lamoon, Pháo); team "Eyes" (Miu Lê, Ngô Lan Hương, Tao Yi A1J, Muộii, Saabirose); team "Wings" (Bảo Anh, Mỹ Mỹ, Quỳnh Anh Shyn, Orange, Vũ Thảo My); team "Infinity" (Phương Ly, Juky San, Chi Xê, Hoàng Duyên, Tiên Tiên) and team "Shield" (LyLy, Lâm Bảo Ngọc, Liu Grace, Han Sara, Danmy).

Each team then chose their team captain (except for Miu Lê who automatically became a team leader as a reward to her completion of the secret mission being given prior, although she later abandoned the role due to the show's twist). The team leaders are: Tiên Tiên (team Infinity), Bích Phương (team Diamond), LyLy (team Shield), Quỳnh Anh Shyn (team Wings), Châu Bùi (team The moon hugs the sun) and Miu Lê (team Eyes). Then, the contestants who own the Pyraminx (Miu Lê, Bảo Anh, Tiên Tiên) have the ability to switch team with another "em xinh". In case of a team captain switching team, the em xinh that replaced their spot would be the new team captain. The teams after switching are as follow ("em xinh" with their name bolded are that team's captain):

- Team "The moon hugs the sun": **Châu Bùi**, Yeolan, Lyhan, 52Hz, Ánh Sáng AZA
- Team "Diamond": **Bích Phương**, Phương Mỹ Chi, Tiên Tiên, Lamoon, Pháo
- Team "Eyes": **MaiQuinn**, Ngô Lan Hương, Tao Yi A1J, Muộii, Saabirose
- Team "Wings": **Quỳnh Anh Shyn**, Miu Lê, Mỹ Mỹ, Orange, Vũ Thảo My
- Team "Infinity" **Pháo**, Phương Ly, Juky San, Chi Xê, Hoàng Duyên
- Team "Shield" **LyLy**, Lâm Bảo Ngọc, Liu Grace, Han Sara, Danmy

The remaining score after the games are being used to purchase shoes for the game, each with different prices. The order to buy shoes are based on the team's total score. Team "The moon hugs the sun" does not have enough points to buy shoes for the whole team, therefore have to use the shoes chosen by the host. After a catwalk session to warmup, each team would do a splitting challenge using the chosen shoes, creating a line from the first feet to the second feet. The team's score is the total length of all 5 lines created by all members. The team with more length have priority to choose their song demo.

After the game, the whole cast had the chance to listen and choose from the six new song demos. After the process of song choosing, all 30 em xinh would create two armies through randomization. After the process of randomization, four em xinh that possessed the Rubik cube (Phương Mỹ Chi, LyLy, Danmy, Châu Bùi) would pick a member in their army to switch with another member of the other army. As the result of the switch, Pháo was switched with Bích Phương, Lâm Bảo Ngọc was switched with Bảo Anh, Miu Lê was switched with Tiên Tiên and Phương Ly was switched with Ánh Sáng AZA. Each team also chose an army leader, with Bích Phương and Tiên Tiên are the two armies leader for army 1 and army 2, respectively.

The final lineup for two armies are as follow (army leader name are in bold)

Army 1: Bích Phương, Phương Ly, Miu Lê, Bảo Anh, Lyly, Mỹ Mỹ, Quỳnh Anh Shyn, Orange, Liu Grace, Vũ Thảo My, Ngô Lan Hương, Chi Xê, Hoàng Duyên, Saabirose and Lamoon.

Army 2: Tiên Tiên, Lâm Bảo Ngọc, Châu Bùi, MaiQuinn, Juky San, Yeolan, Lyhan, Tao Yi A1J, 52Hz, Han Sara, Muộii, Phương Mỹ Chi, Pháo, Danmy, Ánh Sáng AZA.

For the first Livestage, 30 em xinh have to perform two songs in two rounds:

- Round 1 - Armies battle: Each army have to perform their own remake of the show's theme song (The Real Aura). After each performance, 300 studio audiences would vote for the performance (they can vote for both). The army with higher score would be the winner of the round and each member would have 50 additional points to their own individual points.
- Round 2 - Group battle: Each team would perform their own song derived from the assigned demo. After each performance, 300 studio audiences would vote for each em xinh to create their individual score (it is possible to vote for every em xinh). After every performances, audience would vote for two of their favorite performances. The three teams with the most votes would have each of its member to have 100, 75 or 50 points respectively.

Concluding Livestage 1, army 2 is the winner of the first round, resulting in all 15 members of the team have an extra 50 points for their individual score. For the second round, team Diamond, The moon hugs the sun and Eyes are the top three teams, receiving 114, 98 and 97 votes respectively. This mean that each member of the teams Diamond, The moon hugs the sun and Eyes receive 100, 75 and 50 points respectively. The rest of the teams receive 95, 82 and 81 votes, although the host did not specify which team receive how many.

No "em xinh" was eliminated after Livestage 1.

Livestage 1
Episode 1 – Armies battle (31/05/2025)
Army	Performance order	Song [English translation] (Credit)	Members					Votes		Result
Army 1	1	"Đã xinh lại còn thông minh" [Beautiful and Smart] (JustaTee, Pixel Neko, Mary, (Note: This is the pseudonym Bích Phương used when writing songs for the show.) Orange, Liu Grace, Ngô Lan Hương, Saabirose)	**Bích Phương**					247		Lost
Army 1	1	"Đã xinh lại còn thông minh" [Beautiful and Smart] (JustaTee, Pixel Neko, Mary, Orange, Liu Grace, Ngô Lan Hương, Saabirose)	Phương Ly					247		Lost
Army 1	1	"Đã xinh lại còn thông minh" [Beautiful and Smart] (JustaTee, Pixel Neko, Mary, Orange, Liu Grace, Ngô Lan Hương, Saabirose)	Miu Lê					247		Lost
Army 1	1	"Đã xinh lại còn thông minh" [Beautiful and Smart] (JustaTee, Pixel Neko, Mary, Orange, Liu Grace, Ngô Lan Hương, Saabirose)	Bảo Anh					247		Lost
Army 1	1	"Đã xinh lại còn thông minh" [Beautiful and Smart] (JustaTee, Pixel Neko, Mary, Orange, Liu Grace, Ngô Lan Hương, Saabirose)	Lyly					247		Lost
Army 1	1	"Đã xinh lại còn thông minh" [Beautiful and Smart] (JustaTee, Pixel Neko, Mary, Orange, Liu Grace, Ngô Lan Hương, Saabirose)	Mỹ Mỹ					247		Lost
Army 1	1	"Đã xinh lại còn thông minh" [Beautiful and Smart] (JustaTee, Pixel Neko, Mary, Orange, Liu Grace, Ngô Lan Hương, Saabirose)	Quỳnh Anh Shyn					247		Lost
Army 1	1	"Đã xinh lại còn thông minh" [Beautiful and Smart] (JustaTee, Pixel Neko, Mary, Orange, Liu Grace, Ngô Lan Hương, Saabirose)	Orange					247		Lost
Army 1	1	"Đã xinh lại còn thông minh" [Beautiful and Smart] (JustaTee, Pixel Neko, Mary, Orange, Liu Grace, Ngô Lan Hương, Saabirose)	Liu Grace					247		Lost
Army 1	1	"Đã xinh lại còn thông minh" [Beautiful and Smart] (JustaTee, Pixel Neko, Mary, Orange, Liu Grace, Ngô Lan Hương, Saabirose)	Vũ Thảo My					247		Lost
Army 1	1	"Đã xinh lại còn thông minh" [Beautiful and Smart] (JustaTee, Pixel Neko, Mary, Orange, Liu Grace, Ngô Lan Hương, Saabirose)	Ngô Lan Hương					247		Lost
Army 1	1	"Đã xinh lại còn thông minh" [Beautiful and Smart] (JustaTee, Pixel Neko, Mary, Orange, Liu Grace, Ngô Lan Hương, Saabirose)	Chi Xê					247		Lost
Army 1	1	"Đã xinh lại còn thông minh" [Beautiful and Smart] (JustaTee, Pixel Neko, Mary, Orange, Liu Grace, Ngô Lan Hương, Saabirose)	Hoàng Duyên					247		Lost
Army 1	1	"Đã xinh lại còn thông minh" [Beautiful and Smart] (JustaTee, Pixel Neko, Mary, Orange, Liu Grace, Ngô Lan Hương, Saabirose)	Saabirose					247		Lost
Army 1	1	"Đã xinh lại còn thông minh" [Beautiful and Smart] (JustaTee, Pixel Neko, Mary, Orange, Liu Grace, Ngô Lan Hương, Saabirose)	Lamoon					247		Lost
Army 2	2	"AAA" (JustaTee, Kado, Tiên Tiên, Juky San, Lyhan, Tao Zi A1J, 52Hz, Muộii, Pháo Northside, Danmy, Ánh Sáng AZA)	**Tiên Tiên**					**284**		**Won** (50 additional individual points)
Army 2	2	"AAA" (JustaTee, Kado, Tiên Tiên, Juky San, Lyhan, Tao Zi A1J, 52Hz, Muộii, Pháo Northside, Danmy, Ánh Sáng AZA)	Lâm Bảo Ngọc					**284**		**Won** (50 additional individual points)
Army 2	2	"AAA" (JustaTee, Kado, Tiên Tiên, Juky San, Lyhan, Tao Zi A1J, 52Hz, Muộii, Pháo Northside, Danmy, Ánh Sáng AZA)	Châu Bùi					**284**		**Won** (50 additional individual points)
Army 2	2	"AAA" (JustaTee, Kado, Tiên Tiên, Juky San, Lyhan, Tao Zi A1J, 52Hz, Muộii, Pháo Northside, Danmy, Ánh Sáng AZA)	MaiQuinn					**284**		**Won** (50 additional individual points)
Army 2	2	"AAA" (JustaTee, Kado, Tiên Tiên, Juky San, Lyhan, Tao Zi A1J, 52Hz, Muộii, Pháo Northside, Danmy, Ánh Sáng AZA)	Juky San					**284**		**Won** (50 additional individual points)
Army 2	2	"AAA" (JustaTee, Kado, Tiên Tiên, Juky San, Lyhan, Tao Zi A1J, 52Hz, Muộii, Pháo Northside, Danmy, Ánh Sáng AZA)	Yeolan					**284**		**Won** (50 additional individual points)
Army 2	2	"AAA" (JustaTee, Kado, Tiên Tiên, Juky San, Lyhan, Tao Zi A1J, 52Hz, Muộii, Pháo Northside, Danmy, Ánh Sáng AZA)	Lyhan					**284**		**Won** (50 additional individual points)
Army 2	2	"AAA" (JustaTee, Kado, Tiên Tiên, Juky San, Lyhan, Tao Zi A1J, 52Hz, Muộii, Pháo Northside, Danmy, Ánh Sáng AZA)	Tao Yi A1J					**284**		**Won** (50 additional individual points)
Army 2	2	"AAA" (JustaTee, Kado, Tiên Tiên, Juky San, Lyhan, Tao Zi A1J, 52Hz, Muộii, Pháo Northside, Danmy, Ánh Sáng AZA)	52Hz					**284**		**Won** (50 additional individual points)
Army 2	2	"AAA" (JustaTee, Kado, Tiên Tiên, Juky San, Lyhan, Tao Zi A1J, 52Hz, Muộii, Pháo Northside, Danmy, Ánh Sáng AZA)	Han Sara					**284**		**Won** (50 additional individual points)
Army 2	2	"AAA" (JustaTee, Kado, Tiên Tiên, Juky San, Lyhan, Tao Zi A1J, 52Hz, Muộii, Pháo Northside, Danmy, Ánh Sáng AZA)	Muộii					**284**		**Won** (50 additional individual points)
Army 2	2	"AAA" (JustaTee, Kado, Tiên Tiên, Juky San, Lyhan, Tao Zi A1J, 52Hz, Muộii, Pháo Northside, Danmy, Ánh Sáng AZA)	Phương Mỹ Chi					**284**		**Won** (50 additional individual points)
Army 2	2	"AAA" (JustaTee, Kado, Tiên Tiên, Juky San, Lyhan, Tao Zi A1J, 52Hz, Muộii, Pháo Northside, Danmy, Ánh Sáng AZA)	Pháo					**284**		**Won** (50 additional individual points)
Army 2	2	"AAA" (JustaTee, Kado, Tiên Tiên, Juky San, Lyhan, Tao Zi A1J, 52Hz, Muộii, Pháo Northside, Danmy, Ánh Sáng AZA)	Danmy					**284**		**Won** (50 additional individual points)
Army 2	2	"AAA" (JustaTee, Kado, Tiên Tiên, Juky San, Lyhan, Tao Zi A1J, 52Hz, Muộii, Pháo Northside, Danmy, Ánh Sáng AZA)	Ánh Sáng AZA					**284**		**Won** (50 additional individual points)
Episode 2 - Team battle (7/6/2025)
Team	Performance order	Song [English translation] (Credits)	Members	Individual votes	#	Total individual score	#	Performance votes	Rank	Result
Infinity	1	"Em xinh em bling" [Beautiful and shiny] (RedT, DBaola, ducnn, Juky San, Chi Xê, Pháo Northside)	Phương Ly	249	5	249	20	Not public	4-6th	No additional individual points
Infinity	1	"Em xinh em bling" [Beautiful and shiny] (RedT, DBaola, ducnn, Juky San, Chi Xê, Pháo Northside)	Juky San	203	20	253	19	Not public	4-6th	No additional individual points
Infinity	1	"Em xinh em bling" [Beautiful and shiny] (RedT, DBaola, ducnn, Juky San, Chi Xê, Pháo Northside)	Chi Xê	170	30	170	30	Not public	4-6th	No additional individual points
Infinity	1	"Em xinh em bling" [Beautiful and shiny] (RedT, DBaola, ducnn, Juky San, Chi Xê, Pháo Northside)	Hoàng Duyên	179	29	179	29	Not public	4-6th	No additional individual points
Infinity	1	"Em xinh em bling" [Beautiful and shiny] (RedT, DBaola, ducnn, Juky San, Chi Xê, Pháo Northside)	**Pháo**	238	7	288	14	Not public	4-6th	No additional individual points
Eyes	2	"Easier" (Jabb Võ (Tổng Đài), Lý Anh Khoa (Tổng Đài), Nguyễn Lưu Thanh An (Tổng Đài), Minsicko, MaiQuinn, Ngô Lan Hương, Tao Zi A1J, Muộii, Saabirose)	Ngô Lan Hương	210	19	260	18	97	3rd	50 additional individual points
Eyes	2	"Easier" (Jabb Võ (Tổng Đài), Lý Anh Khoa (Tổng Đài), Nguyễn Lưu Thanh An (Tổng Đài), Minsicko, MaiQuinn, Ngô Lan Hương, Tao Zi A1J, Muộii, Saabirose)	**MaiQuinn**	214	17	314	10	97	3rd	50 additional individual points
Eyes	2	"Easier" (Jabb Võ (Tổng Đài), Lý Anh Khoa (Tổng Đài), Nguyễn Lưu Thanh An (Tổng Đài), Minsicko, MaiQuinn, Ngô Lan Hương, Tao Zi A1J, Muộii, Saabirose)	Tao Yi A1J	191	26	291	13	97	3rd	50 additional individual points
Eyes	2	"Easier" (Jabb Võ (Tổng Đài), Lý Anh Khoa (Tổng Đài), Nguyễn Lưu Thanh An (Tổng Đài), Minsicko, MaiQuinn, Ngô Lan Hương, Tao Zi A1J, Muộii, Saabirose)	Muộii	218	14-15	318	8	97	3rd	50 additional individual points
Eyes	2	"Easier" (Jabb Võ (Tổng Đài), Lý Anh Khoa (Tổng Đài), Nguyễn Lưu Thanh An (Tổng Đài), Minsicko, MaiQuinn, Ngô Lan Hương, Tao Zi A1J, Muộii, Saabirose)	Saabirose	197	24	247	22	97	3rd	50 additional individual points
Shield	3	"Từng" [Used to] (Ben Ngo, Darrys, Tieman, LyLy, Liu Grace, Danmy)	**LyLy**	223	9	223	24	Not public	4-6th	No additional individual points
Shield	3	"Từng" [Used to] (Ben Ngo, Darrys, Tieman, LyLy, Liu Grace, Danmy)	Lâm Bảo Ngọc	221	11	271	15	Not public	4-6th	No additional individual points
Shield	3	"Từng" [Used to] (Ben Ngo, Darrys, Tieman, LyLy, Liu Grace, Danmy)	Liu Grace	222	10	222	25	Not public	4-6th	No additional individual points
Shield	3	"Từng" [Used to] (Ben Ngo, Darrys, Tieman, LyLy, Liu Grace, Danmy)	Han Sara	220	12-13	270	16	Not public	4-6th	No additional individual points
Shield	3	"Từng" [Used to] (Ben Ngo, Darrys, Tieman, LyLy, Liu Grace, Danmy)	Danmy	196	25	246	23	Not public	4-6th	No additional individual points
Wings	4	"Đồng dao xinh gái" (Note: Original title: "Đồng dao Beauty" (Beauty of Folk).)[Beauty of Folk] (Jabb Võ (Tổng Đài), Lý Anh Khoa (Tổng Đài), Nguyễn Lưu Thanh An (Tổng Đài), Gxxfy, JustaTee, Orange)	Miu Lê	264	1	264	17	Not public	4-6th	No additional individual points
Wings	4	"Đồng dao xinh gái"[Beauty of Folk] (Jabb Võ (Tổng Đài), Lý Anh Khoa (Tổng Đài), Nguyễn Lưu Thanh An (Tổng Đài), Gxxfy, JustaTee, Orange)	Mỹ Mỹ	218	14-15	218	26	Not public	4-6th	No additional individual points
Wings	4	"Đồng dao xinh gái"[Beauty of Folk] (Jabb Võ (Tổng Đài), Lý Anh Khoa (Tổng Đài), Nguyễn Lưu Thanh An (Tổng Đài), Gxxfy, JustaTee, Orange)	**Quỳnh Anh Shyn**	215	16	215	27	Not public	4-6th	No additional individual points
Wings	4	"Đồng dao xinh gái"[Beauty of Folk] (Jabb Võ (Tổng Đài), Lý Anh Khoa (Tổng Đài), Nguyễn Lưu Thanh An (Tổng Đài), Gxxfy, JustaTee, Orange)	Orange	248	6	248	21	Not public	4-6th	No additional individual points
Wings	4	"Đồng dao xinh gái"[Beauty of Folk] (Jabb Võ (Tổng Đài), Lý Anh Khoa (Tổng Đài), Nguyễn Lưu Thanh An (Tổng Đài), Gxxfy, JustaTee, Orange)	Vũ Thảo My	212	18	212	28	Not public	4-6th	No additional individual points
The moon hugs the sun	5	"Run" (Jabb Võ (Tổng Đài), Lý Anh Khoa (Tổng Đài), Nguyễn Lưu Thanh An (Tổng Đài), Dreamble, Châu Bùi, Yeolan, Lyhan, 52Hz, Ánh Sáng AZA)	**Châu Bùi**	202	21-22	327	5	98	2nd	75 additional individual points
The moon hugs the sun	5	"Run" (Jabb Võ (Tổng Đài), Lý Anh Khoa (Tổng Đài), Nguyễn Lưu Thanh An (Tổng Đài), Dreamble, Châu Bùi, Yeolan, Lyhan, 52Hz, Ánh Sáng AZA)	Yeolan	181	28	306	11	98	2nd	75 additional individual points
The moon hugs the sun	5	"Run" (Jabb Võ (Tổng Đài), Lý Anh Khoa (Tổng Đài), Nguyễn Lưu Thanh An (Tổng Đài), Dreamble, Châu Bùi, Yeolan, Lyhan, 52Hz, Ánh Sáng AZA)	Lyhan	190	27	315	9	98	2nd	75 additional individual points
The moon hugs the sun	5	"Run" (Jabb Võ (Tổng Đài), Lý Anh Khoa (Tổng Đài), Nguyễn Lưu Thanh An (Tổng Đài), Dreamble, Châu Bùi, Yeolan, Lyhan, 52Hz, Ánh Sáng AZA)	52Hz	254	3	379	2	98	2nd	75 additional individual points
The moon hugs the sun	5	"Run" (Jabb Võ (Tổng Đài), Lý Anh Khoa (Tổng Đài), Nguyễn Lưu Thanh An (Tổng Đài), Dreamble, Châu Bùi, Yeolan, Lyhan, 52Hz, Ánh Sáng AZA)	Ánh Sáng AZA	201	23	326	6	98	2nd	75 additional individual points
Diamond	6	"Cầm kỳ thi họa" [Music, chess, calligraphy, drawing] (Tuấn Cry, Masew, DJ Feliks, DTAP, Tiên Tiên, Phương Mỹ Chi, Lamoon)	**Bích Phương**	259	2	359	4	**114**	**1st**	**100 additional individual points**
Diamond	6	"Cầm kỳ thi họa" [Music, chess, calligraphy, drawing] (Tuấn Cry, Masew, DJ Feliks, DTAP, Tiên Tiên, Phương Mỹ Chi, Lamoon)	Tiên Tiên	227	8	377	3	**114**	**1st**	**100 additional individual points**
Diamond	6	"Cầm kỳ thi họa" [Music, chess, calligraphy, drawing] (Tuấn Cry, Masew, DJ Feliks, DTAP, Tiên Tiên, Phương Mỹ Chi, Lamoon)	Bảo Anh	220	12-13	320	7	**114**	**1st**	**100 additional individual points**
Diamond	6	"Cầm kỳ thi họa" [Music, chess, calligraphy, drawing] (Tuấn Cry, Masew, DJ Feliks, DTAP, Tiên Tiên, Phương Mỹ Chi, Lamoon)	Phương Mỹ Chi	251	4	401	1	**114**	**1st**	**100 additional individual points**
Diamond	6	"Cầm kỳ thi họa" [Music, chess, calligraphy, drawing] (Tuấn Cry, Masew, DJ Feliks, DTAP, Tiên Tiên, Phương Mỹ Chi, Lamoon)	Lamoon	202	21-22	302	12	**114**	**1st**	**100 additional individual points**

Team captain

Winning/Highest ranking team's score

=== Livestage 2 ===
Prior to Livestage 2, a team and song choosing round were organized. 30 "em xinh" was divided into four teams, two 8 members teams and two 7 members teams. Four new team captains were chosen, two of whom being the two "em xinh" with the most individual points (Phương Mỹ Chi and 52Hz); the other two having the most audience votes (Bích Phương and Miu Lê). The team members quantity was determined through randomization, with 52Hz's and Bích Phương's team having 8 members and 7 members for Miu Lê's and Phương Mỹ Chi's team.

There are three rounds of team picking:

- First round: each team captain go to their own separate area to choose three fans with three "em xinh"'s name they want to form team with, including one "em xinh" with an odd rank number, one with an even rank number and another of their choice. Those who was chosen by one or more team captains would move to an area to hear the captain's plea. They could either join a team or reject the team captains and move to the "upheaval" area (bể dâu) (where they no longer have the ability to choose their team).
- Second round: the rest of the cast who were not chosen by the team's captain would put the fan with their name on it to a team's area that they want to join. They then have to convince their selected team captain to choose them for their team. The captain then either reject or accept that "em xinh" into their team (the maximum "em xinh" they could accept is the number of vacant spot in their team). The "em xinh" that are accepted into a team would join that team, those that got rejected would move to the "upheaval" area.
- Third round: the captains who still haven't have enough team members would select members from the "upheaval" area through randomization. Each of the remaining em xinh would tie their hand to a string. The leaders on the other side would not know which string belong to who. They must pull the amount of strings equal to the amount of vacant spot in their team. Whichever em xinh's string that the captain pulled would automatically placed them in that team.

The teams for this round are (team's captain are highlighted in bold), and the rounds of selection of each "em xinh" were

- **52Hz;** Orange (first round); Châu Bùi, Mỹ Mỹ, Lâm Bảo Ngọc, Saabirose (second round); MaiQuinn, Quỳnh Anh Shyn (third round)
- **Bích Phương;** Ngô Lan Hương, Lamoon (first round); Hoàng Duyên, Lyhan, Muộii, Yeolan, Han Sara (third round)
- **Miu Lê;** Danmy, Tiên Tiên, LyLy (first round); Juky San, Tao Yi A1J, (second round), Vũ Thảo My (third round)
- **Phương Mỹ Chi;** Phương Ly, Ánh Sáng AZA (second round); Chi Xê, Pháo, Bảo Anh, Liu Grace (third round)

After the team formation, the whole cast had a night activity and participate in games and missions to earn points. The next day, all 30 em xinh proceeded to select the songs for Livestage 2, as well as selecting the male guest artists that would be featured in their songs. Those guest artists are: Wean, Pháp Kiều, Quang Hùng MasterD, Gemini Hùng Huỳnh, Negav, Tăng Duy Tân, JSOL and Dương Domic.

The process of choosing the guest features are as follow,

Each team would have two out of eight available guest artists to feature on their performances. Prior to the taping of this section, all of the artists would make a poster involving hints about another one. In order to have that artist to their team, the team must guess correctly which poster are portraying which artist. The guessing order are based on the result of the minigames prior.

The guests for each team are:

- Phương Mỹ Chi's team: Wean, Negav
- 52Hz's team: Pháp Kiều, Quang Hùng MasterD
- Miu Lê's team: Dương Domic, Gemini Hùng Huỳnh
- Bích Phương's team: JSOL, Tăng Duy Tân

After choosing the guests, the teams would begin choosing songs. The process of choosing songs happened through a bidding process.

- Round 1: Each team would have a fund of points, being 70% to 80% of the total Livestage 1's individual points from all the team members, along with game score and lucky score. The host then play the first 4 demos randomly with the starting price increasing from the previous one, being 400, 500, 600 and 700 points. Before the host say the song title, all of the teams have 10 seconds to choose if they want to participate. If no teams join, every team would be deducted the amount of points equal to the starting price and the song would be bet last. If only one team want to participate, that song automatically go to them. If there are two teams or more wants to participate, the bidding would happen and each team could bid 30 points more from the previous bidding value. If the team cannot continue bidding, they would get their points deducted to the amount equal to the starting price. The team who get the last song would have to buy it with 60% of the remaining points in their fund.
- Round 2: The team's remaining unused points are added to their bidding fund. They would then divide the fund into three out of four remaining demos. The priority of bidding which demo are based on the number of participating teams and total amount of points being set to the song. The team who set the highest amount for that song would have that amount as the starting price. Then, the bidding process happened the same way as the first round, when each team then divide the fund into two out of three demos and for all the remaining two demos. The team who got the last song would have to use all of their remaining fund to buy that song.

Here's the funding and bidding process

Funding and bidding process
Team	Total of members' Livestage 1 individual score	Game score (Note: The score of guessing the AI-voiced songs, each song guessed equals to 20 points)	Lucky score (Note: The score collected from rewards/penalties on each piece of paper)	Total fund	Round 1 fund	Round 1 song	Price	Round 2 song	Price	Remaining fund
Bích Phương	2309	100	110	2519	1800	Red Flag	1080 (Note: 60% of the team's round 1 fund. The price of the song was not disclosed during the recording process)	Em chỉ là (I'm just)	1100	**339**
52Hz	2219	120	140	2479	1950	Không đau nữa rồi (No more pain)	900	Gã săn cá (Fisherman)	1300	279
Phương Mỹ Chi	1976	80	150	2206	1544	Hề (Hilarious)	960	Perfect	1200	46
Miu Lê	1866	80	150	2096	1488	We belong together	1450	Điều em luôn mong muốn (What I really want)	646 (Note: All the remaining fund)	0

After the bidding, Bích Phương's team have the highest remaining fund. As a reward, they have an extra 50 points added to the total team's votes at the end of Livestage 2.

Based on the betting, the team songs for this round are:

- Phương Mỹ Chi's team: Hề (Hilarious), Perfect
- 52Hz's team: Không đau nữa rồi (No more pain), Gã săn cá (Fisherman)
- Miu Lê's team: We belong together, Điều em luôn mong muốn (What I really want)
- Bích Phương's team: Red Flag, Em chỉ là (I'm just)

For Livestage 2, all four teams have to perform two songs in two units. Each unit would contain 3 or 4 members and a guest, performed over two nights. The first night is for the 4-members units and the second night is for the remaining members who haven't perform. After each performance, audience would vote for each individual "em xinh". At the conclusion of each night, they would vote for 2 out of 4 performances that performed in that night. The team points would be the total votes from two performances and the bonus points (if applicable). The team with the highest total points would be the winning team, with all of the members safe from elimination, no matter their individual votes. Six "em xinh" from the remaining teams that have the lowest votes would be eliminated.

For Livestage 2, the two units that won their specific night are "Không đau nữa rồi" (No more pain) (52Hz's team) with 185 votes and "Em chỉ là" (I'm just) (Bích Phương's team) with 208 votes. 52Hz's team is the winner of the Livestage with 339 votes total, despise Bích Phương's team having a 50 points bonus.

Six "em xinh" that were eliminated based on individual votes from the danger teams are: Chi Xê (Phương Mỹ Chi's team), Danmy, LyLy (Miu Lê's team), Yeolan, Ngô Lan Hương and Hoàng Duyên (Bích Phương's team).

Livestage 2
Episode 4 – First performance night (21/6/2025)
Team	Performance order	Song [English translation] (Credits)	Members	Individual votes	#	Guest artist	Votes		Result
Phương Mỹ Chi	1	"Hề" [Hilarious] (Hoàng Thống, Minsicko, DTAP, WEAN, Chi Xê, Phương Mỹ Chi, Pháo Northside)	Phương Ly	224	8	WEAN	148		Safe
Phương Mỹ Chi	1	"Hề" [Hilarious] (Hoàng Thống, Minsicko, DTAP, WEAN, Chi Xê, Phương Mỹ Chi, Pháo Northside)	Chi Xê	160	30	WEAN	148		Eliminated
Phương Mỹ Chi	1	"Hề" [Hilarious] (Hoàng Thống, Minsicko, DTAP, WEAN, Chi Xê, Phương Mỹ Chi, Pháo Northside)	**Phương Mỹ Chi**	231	6	WEAN	148		Safe
Phương Mỹ Chi	1	"Hề" [Hilarious] (Hoàng Thống, Minsicko, DTAP, WEAN, Chi Xê, Phương Mỹ Chi, Pháo Northside)	Pháo	187	22	WEAN	148		Safe
Bích Phương	2	"Red Flag" (Jabb Võ (Tổng Đài), Lý Anh Khoa (Tổng Đài), JustaTee, CM1X, Gxxfy, BeeBB, ducnn, JSOL, Ngô Lan Hương, Lamoon)	Ngô Lan Hương	183	25	JSOL	74		Eliminated
Bích Phương	2	"Red Flag" (Jabb Võ (Tổng Đài), Lý Anh Khoa (Tổng Đài), JustaTee, CM1X, Gxxfy, BeeBB, ducnn, JSOL, Ngô Lan Hương, Lamoon)	Yeolan	185	24	JSOL	74		Eliminated
Bích Phương	2	"Red Flag" (Jabb Võ (Tổng Đài), Lý Anh Khoa (Tổng Đài), JustaTee, CM1X, Gxxfy, BeeBB, ducnn, JSOL, Ngô Lan Hương, Lamoon)	Han Sara	189	21	JSOL	74		Safe
Bích Phương	2	"Red Flag" (Jabb Võ (Tổng Đài), Lý Anh Khoa (Tổng Đài), JustaTee, CM1X, Gxxfy, BeeBB, ducnn, JSOL, Ngô Lan Hương, Lamoon)	Lamoon	186	23	JSOL	74		Safe
Miu Lê	3	"We Belong Together" (Châu Đăng Khoa, Dreamble, Minsicko, Miu Lê, LyLy, Juky San, Dương Domic, Danmy)	**Miu Lê**	236	3	Dương Domic	139		Safe
Miu Lê	3	"We Belong Together" (Châu Đăng Khoa, Dreamble, Minsicko, Miu Lê, LyLy, Juky San, Dương Domic, Danmy)	LyLy	171	27	Dương Domic	139		Eliminated
Miu Lê	3	"We Belong Together" (Châu Đăng Khoa, Dreamble, Minsicko, Miu Lê, LyLy, Juky San, Dương Domic, Danmy)	Juky San	200	19	Dương Domic	139		Safe
Miu Lê	3	"We Belong Together" (Châu Đăng Khoa, Dreamble, Minsicko, Miu Lê, LyLy, Juky San, Dương Domic, Danmy)	Danmy	166	29	Dương Domic	139		Eliminated
52Hz	4	"Không đau nữa rồi" [No more pain] (buitruonglinh, Đoàn Minh Vũ, Tieman, Rio, Minsicko, Orange, 52Hz, Pháp Kiều)	Mỹ Mỹ	197	20	Pháp Kiều	**185**		Safe
52Hz	4	"Không đau nữa rồi" [No more pain] (buitruonglinh, Đoàn Minh Vũ, Tieman, Rio, Minsicko, Orange, 52Hz, Pháp Kiều)	Orange	238	2	Pháp Kiều	**185**		Safe
52Hz	4	"Không đau nữa rồi" [No more pain] (buitruonglinh, Đoàn Minh Vũ, Tieman, Rio, Minsicko, Orange, 52Hz, Pháp Kiều)	Châu Bùi	170	28	Pháp Kiều	**185**		Safe
52Hz	4	"Không đau nữa rồi" [No more pain] (buitruonglinh, Đoàn Minh Vũ, Tieman, Rio, Minsicko, Orange, 52Hz, Pháp Kiều)	**52Hz**	241	1	Pháp Kiều	**185**		Safe
Episode 5 – Second performance night (28/6/2025)
Team	Performance order	Song [English translation] (Credits)	Members	Individual votes	#	Guest artist	Votes	Total points	Result
Miu Lê	1	"Điều em luôn mong muốn" [What I really want] (Jabb Võ (Tổng Đài), Lý Anh Khoa (Tổng Đài), Gxxfy, Kado, Juky San, Tao Zi A1J)	Tiên Tiên	223	9	Gemini Hùng Huỳnh	60	199	Safe
Miu Lê	1	"Điều em luôn mong muốn" [What I really want] (Jabb Võ (Tổng Đài), Lý Anh Khoa (Tổng Đài), Gxxfy, Kado, Juky San, Tao Zi A1J)	Vũ Thảo My	207	14-16	Gemini Hùng Huỳnh	60	199	Safe
Miu Lê	1	"Điều em luôn mong muốn" [What I really want] (Jabb Võ (Tổng Đài), Lý Anh Khoa (Tổng Đài), Gxxfy, Kado, Juky San, Tao Zi A1J)	Tao Yi A1J	207	14-16	Gemini Hùng Huỳnh	60	199	Safe
52Hz	2	"Gã săn cá" [Fisherman] (DC Tâm, BeeBB, DBaola, Minsicko, Orange, Quang Hùng MasterD, 52Hz, Saabirose)	Lâm Bảo Ngọc	221	10-11	Quang Hùng MasterD	154	**339**	Safe
52Hz	2	"Gã săn cá" [Fisherman] (DC Tâm, BeeBB, DBaola, Minsicko, Orange, Quang Hùng MasterD, 52Hz, Saabirose)	Quỳnh Anh Shyn	207	14-16	Quang Hùng MasterD	154	**339**	Safe
52Hz	2	"Gã săn cá" [Fisherman] (DC Tâm, BeeBB, DBaola, Minsicko, Orange, Quang Hùng MasterD, 52Hz, Saabirose)	MaiQuinn	201	18	Quang Hùng MasterD	154	**339**	Safe
52Hz	2	"Gã săn cá" [Fisherman] (DC Tâm, BeeBB, DBaola, Minsicko, Orange, Quang Hùng MasterD, 52Hz, Saabirose)	Saabirose	216	13	Quang Hùng MasterD	154	**339**	Safe
Phương Mỹ Chi	3	"Perfect" (Saabirose, ducnn, Minsicko, Liu Grace, Negav, Ánh Sáng AZA)	Bảo Anh	221	10-11	Negav	82	230	Safe
Phương Mỹ Chi	3	"Perfect" (Saabirose, ducnn, Minsicko, Liu Grace, Negav, Ánh Sáng AZA)	Liu Grace	225	7	Negav	82	230	Safe
Phương Mỹ Chi	3	"Perfect" (Saabirose, ducnn, Minsicko, Liu Grace, Negav, Ánh Sáng AZA)	Ánh Sáng AZA	217	12	Negav	82	230	Safe
Bích Phương	4	"Em chỉ là" [I'm just] (RedT, Tinle, Nguyễn Hữu Vượng, Bích Phương, Tăng Duy Tân, Hoàng Duyên, Lyhan, Muộii)	**Bích Phương**	234	4	Tăng Duy Tân	**208**	332 (Note: 50 points added to the original team total score of 282)	Safe
Bích Phương	4	"Em chỉ là" [I'm just] (RedT, Tinle, Nguyễn Hữu Vượng, Bích Phương, Tăng Duy Tân, Hoàng Duyên, Lyhan, Muộii)	Lyhan	233	5	Tăng Duy Tân	**208**	332	Safe
Bích Phương	4	"Em chỉ là" [I'm just] (RedT, Tinle, Nguyễn Hữu Vượng, Bích Phương, Tăng Duy Tân, Hoàng Duyên, Lyhan, Muộii)	Hoàng Duyên	173	26	Tăng Duy Tân	**208**	332	Eliminated
Bích Phương	4	"Em chỉ là" [I'm just] (RedT, Tinle, Nguyễn Hữu Vượng, Bích Phương, Tăng Duy Tân, Hoàng Duyên, Lyhan, Muộii)	Muộii	205	17	Tăng Duy Tân	**208**	332	Safe

Team captain

Highest scoring performance of the night

Safe team's total score

For song units without the main team captains: Ngô Lan Hương (Red Flag), Tiên Tiên (Điều em luôn mong muốn (What I really want)), Liu Grace (Perfect) and Saabirose (Gã săn cá (Fisherman)) are unofficially selected as teams vice-captains/units captains.

=== Livestage 3 ===
At the third Livestage, 24 remaining "em xinh" was divided into six 4-members team. 3 "em xinh" with the highest votes (52Hz, Orange and Miu Lê) were the first three captains of the round. The studio audience from the last Livestage also voted for two "em xinh" that they want to see them being a team's captain. Tiên Tiên and Phương Ly were next two captains based on the voting. The last captain, Mỹ Mỹ, was decided through randomization.

The process of team selecting are as follow (during the process, no "em xinh" may reject the captain's proposal). Each captain may "oppose" the captain's proposal once throughout the entire process (the "oppose" only counts if they successfully steal the "em xinh" from another captain):

- First round: each captain select an "em xinh" they want them to join their team. The order is based on the captain's rank from the last Livestage. If no other captain opposes the selection, they automatically join that team. If there are opposition, the selected "em xinh" would make the choice of which team they want to join. In the case of successfully opposition, the captain that were opposed would lose their turn and have to wait until every captain finished the process.
- Second round: six "em xinh" were nominated through the process of randomization. The process are the same as the first round, except the captains can only choose from the nominated six.
- Third round: The process are the same as the first round, except the order of choosing are randomized.

The show then play the six demos for the third Livestage. For the third Livestage, six teams were divided into two armies, each army consisted of three teams. The songs for each army are predetermined by the show's producers. After that, the remaining cast would participate in games to gain points in order to gain priority in choosing the demo. Each team were given 1000 points to distribute them for each game. If the team win the game, they earn the points they betted on. If they lose, they earn nothing. Each team may place a "delusional star" (ngôi sao ảo vọng) on a game (which either add an additional 50% of the betting points on that game to their total points or deduct the same amount if lose).

The armies, teams and songs for this round are as follow (captain's name are highlighted in bold)

Army 1

- **So Đậm (So deep): Phương Ly,** Vũ Thảo My, Châu Bùi, Muộii
- **I'll Be There: Orange,** Han Sara, Phương Mỹ Chi, Lamoon
- **Quả chín quá (Overriped fruit): 52Hz,** Lâm Bảo Ngọc, Tao Yi A1J, Pháo

Army 2

- **Lời thật lòng khi say (Honest words when drunk): Miu Lê,** Bích Phương, Quỳnh Anh Shyn, Juky San
- **Em không có ưa (I don't like): Tiên Tiên,** Bảo Anh, Saabirose, Ánh Sáng AZA
- **Not my fault: Mỹ Mỹ,** Liu Grace, MaiQuinn, Lyhan

The Livestage 3 rules are as follow:

Each team have to participate in two rounds.

- Round 1 - Armies battle: The two armies will battle against the other. Prior to the performances, each army would determine the order of the teams, without knowing the order of the opposing army. The two teams that were determined to perform in the same order would battle against each other (e.g.: the first performing team of Army 1 would go against the first performing team of Army 2). Prior to each battle, each army would distribute 1000 points to all three of their songs (minimum points for each song is 200). If the team won the battle, they keep the points. If the team lose, they keep nothing. The winning army are the one with the higher points after all of the battles.
- Round 2 - Dance battle: Each team would participate in a dance battle against each other. For each round, the team would have a member to participate. In the first round, each nominated contestant would perform a 60-second number with the support from a maximum 4 backup dancers (could be the non-nominated team members). In round 2 and 3, each nominated contestant would perform in a given beat after the host's command. All of the performances result are based on the score given by a panel of five judges and the in-studio audiences. After every round, the team(s) with the lowest points would be eliminated (one in round 1 and two in round 2). Three remaining teams that competed in round 3 will have 100, 80 or 60 points added to their total points (equal to 25, 20 or 15 additional points for each member), based on their round 3 performance.

The team final total points are determined through the sum of each members individual votes and the dance battle bonus points. Two teams with the highest total points and in the winning army are considered the safe teams, with all of the members safely move on to the next round, no matter their individual points. Four "em xinh" with the lowest individual points from the rest of the "danger" teams were eliminated (one in the team with the lowest total point in the winning army, three in the losing army)

Concluding Livestage 3, army 2 won with 600 points over army 1 with 400 points. Two teams with the highest total points in this army are Miu Lê's and Mỹ Mỹ's team, with all members in those two teams were safe from elimination. Four "em xinh" that were eliminated are Muộii (Phương Ly's team), Tao Yi A1J (52Hz's team), Han Sara (Orange's team) in Army 1 and Ánh Sáng AZA (Tiên Tiên's team) in Army 2.

Livestage 3
First round: Armies battle
Army	Team	Performance order	Song [English translation] (Credits)	Members	Individual votes	#	Total individual score	#	Performance vote	Total points	Result
Episode 7 (12/7/2025)
First battle
1	Phương Ly	1	"So đậm" [So deep] (Kai Đinh, Trid Minh, Tinle, Phương Ly, Vũ Thảo My, Châu Bùi, Muộii)	**Phương Ly**	270	2	270	4	**156** (Note: Was added 400 points to the army points due to the army putting 400 points on the song and won.)	965	Safe
1	Phương Ly	1	"So đậm" [So deep] (Kai Đinh, Trid Minh, Tinle, Phương Ly, Vũ Thảo My, Châu Bùi, Muộii)	Vũ Thảo My	234	19	234	20	**156**	965	Safe
1	Phương Ly	1	"So đậm" [So deep] (Kai Đinh, Trid Minh, Tinle, Phương Ly, Vũ Thảo My, Châu Bùi, Muộii)	Châu Bùi	241	14	241	17	**156**	965	Safe
1	Phương Ly	1	"So đậm" [So deep] (Kai Đinh, Trid Minh, Tinle, Phương Ly, Vũ Thảo My, Châu Bùi, Muộii)	Muộii	220	22	220	24	**156**	965	Eliminated
2	Miu Lê	2	"Lời thật lòng khi say" [Honest words when drunk] (Kai Đinh, BeeBB, Darrys, Minsicko, Juky San)	Bích Phương	263	3	278	2	144	**1013**	Safe
2	Miu Lê	2	"Lời thật lòng khi say" [Honest words when drunk] (Kai Đinh, BeeBB, Darrys, Minsicko, Juky San)	**Miu Lê**	238	16-17	253	9-11	144	**1013**	Safe
2	Miu Lê	2	"Lời thật lòng khi say" [Honest words when drunk] (Kai Đinh, BeeBB, Darrys, Minsicko, Juky San)	Quỳnh Anh Shyn	214	23	229	22	144	**1013**	Safe
2	Miu Lê	2	"Lời thật lòng khi say" [Honest words when drunk] (Kai Đinh, BeeBB, Darrys, Minsicko, Juky San)	Juky San	238	16-17	253	9-11	144	**1013**	Safe
Second battle
1	Orange	3	"I'll Be There" (JustaTee, Dreamble, Cheezebout, Minsicko, Orange, Han Sara, Phương Mỹ Chi, Lamoon)	**Orange**	247	6	247	13	141	968	Safe
1	Orange	3	"I'll Be There" (JustaTee, Dreamble, Cheezebout, Minsicko, Orange, Han Sara, Phương Mỹ Chi, Lamoon)	Han Sara	227	21	227	23	141	968	Eliminated
1	Orange	3	"I'll Be There" (JustaTee, Dreamble, Cheezebout, Minsicko, Orange, Han Sara, Phương Mỹ Chi, Lamoon)	Phương Mỹ Chi	251	5	251	12	141	968	Safe
1	Orange	3	"I'll Be There" (JustaTee, Dreamble, Cheezebout, Minsicko, Orange, Han Sara, Phương Mỹ Chi, Lamoon)	Lamoon	243	11-13	243	15-16	141	968	Safe
2	Tiên Tiên	4	"Em không có ưa" [I don't like] (Hưng Cacao, Pixel Neko, Tiên Tiên, Bảo Anh, Saabirose, Ánh Sáng AZA)	**Tiên Tiên**	246	7-8	246	14	**159** (Note: Was added 300 points to the army points due to the army putting 300 points on the song and won.)	964	Safe
2	Tiên Tiên	4	"Em không có ưa" [I don't like] (Hưng Cacao, Pixel Neko, Tiên Tiên, Bảo Anh, Saabirose, Ánh Sáng AZA)	Bảo Anh	240	15	240	18	**159**	964	Safe
2	Tiên Tiên	4	"Em không có ưa" [I don't like] (Hưng Cacao, Pixel Neko, Tiên Tiên, Bảo Anh, Saabirose, Ánh Sáng AZA)	Saabirose	243	11-13	243	15-16	**159**	964	Safe
2	Tiên Tiên	4	"Em không có ưa" [I don't like] (Hưng Cacao, Pixel Neko, Tiên Tiên, Bảo Anh, Saabirose, Ánh Sáng AZA)	Ánh Sáng AZA	235	18	235	19	**159**	964	Eliminated
Episode 8 (19/7/2025)
Third battle
1	52Hz	5	"Quả chín quá" [Overriped fruit] (DC Tâm, Minsicko, Tao Zi A1J, 52Hz, Pháo Northside)	Lâm Bảo Ngọc	253	4	273	3	149	1036	Safe
1	52Hz	5	"Quả chín quá" [Overriped fruit] (DC Tâm, Minsicko, Tao Zi A1J, 52Hz, Pháo Northside)	Tao Yi A1J	213	24	233	21	149	1036	Eliminated
1	52Hz	5	"Quả chín quá" [Overriped fruit] (DC Tâm, Minsicko, Tao Zi A1J, 52Hz, Pháo Northside)	**52Hz**	246	7-8	266	7	149	1036	Safe
1	52Hz	5	"Quả chín quá" [Overriped fruit] (DC Tâm, Minsicko, Tao Zi A1J, 52Hz, Pháo Northside)	Pháo	244	9-10	264	8	149	1036	Safe
2	Mỹ Mỹ	6	"Not My Fault" (Belle MJ, BWGW, Anh Bùi, Dreamble, Liu Grace, MaiQuinn, Lyhan)	**Mỹ Mỹ**	244	9-10	269	5	**151**	**1086**	Safe
2	Mỹ Mỹ	6	"Not My Fault" (Belle MJ, BWGW, Anh Bùi, Dreamble, Liu Grace, MaiQuinn, Lyhan)	Liu Grace	228	20	253	9-11	**151**	**1086**	Safe
2	Mỹ Mỹ	6	"Not My Fault" (Belle MJ, BWGW, Anh Bùi, Dreamble, Liu Grace, MaiQuinn, Lyhan)	MaiQuinn	243	11-13	268	6	**151**	**1086**	Safe
2	Mỹ Mỹ	6	"Not My Fault" (Belle MJ, BWGW, Anh Bùi, Dreamble, Liu Grace, MaiQuinn, Lyhan)	Lyhan	271	1	296	1	**151**	**1086**	Safe
Second round: Dance battle
Performance order	Team		Nominated member	Jury points	#	Audience points	#	Points		Rank	Battle result
Round 1 – Showcase
1	Miu Lê		Bích Phương	**372**	**5**	**204**	**5**	**288**		**5**	Round 2
2	Tiên Tiên		Ánh Sáng AZA	**400**	**4**	**200**	**6**	**300**		**4**	Round 2
3	Phương Ly		Phương Ly	**449**	**2**	**269**	**1**	**359**		**1**	Round 2
4	Mỹ Mỹ		Mỹ Mỹ	**447**	**3**	**235**	**2-3**	**341**		**3**	Round 2
5	Orange		Lamoon (Note: Supported by her non-nominated teammate - Phương Mỹ Chi)	351	6	216	4	283,5		6	Eliminated
6	52Hz		Lâm Bảo Ngọc	**457**	**1**	**235**	**2-3**	**346**		**2**	Round 2
Round 2 – Cypher Battle
1	Tiên Tiên		Bảo Anh	292	5	38	5	165		5	Eliminated
2	Miu Lê		Miu Lê	**446**	**1**	**191**	**1**	**318,5**		**1**	Round 3
3	Phương Ly		Châu Bùi	413	3	84	4	248,5		4	Eliminated
4	52Hz		Tao Yi A1J	**437**	**2**	**112**	**2**	**274,5**		**2**	Round 3
5	Mỹ Mỹ		Lyhan	**408**	**4**	**91**	**3**	**249,5**		**3**	Round 3
Round 3 – Final Cypher Battle
1	52Hz		52Hz	425	2	187	2	306		2	+80 total points
2	Mỹ Mỹ		MaiQuinn	**422**	**3**	**192**	**1**	**307**		**1**	**+100 total points**
3	Miu Lê		Juky San	431	1	173	3	302		3	+60 total points

Team captain

Winning teams in armies battle

Team's progressing to next dance battle round/Safe team's total score

=== Livestage 4 ===
At the fourth performance round, 20 remaining "em xinh" was divided into four 5-members teams. Four "em xinh" with the highest individual points from the last round - Lyhan, Bích Phương, Lâm Bảo Ngọc, Phương Ly - were this round team captains. The rest 16 "em xinh" was divided into two groups (group A and group B). Group A are the "em xinh" with their individual scores being in the 5th to 12th place, and group B are the rest. Prior to the grouping, each "em xinh" would send two or one letter(s) to two (or one) "em xinh" they want to be in the same team with (group A can send out two letters, group B can send out one). Each "em xinh" will then pair up with another one in order to select their team. The process of selecting their partner is as follow:

Each "em xinh" would send out their invite for another "em xinh" to pair up with them (order of inviting are based on how many letters they received prior). The invited "em xinh" could accept or reject the request. If accepted, that two "em xinh" would successfully form a pair. Group A members can reject (or get rejected) once and don't have to face any consequences, while group B members would automatically go to the "upheaval" area if they reject the request or get rejected. The "em xinh"s that haven't formed a pair (hence being in the "upheaval" area) would select their partner based on their individual points from the last round.

After all eight pairs are formed, the team captains begin the process of forming teams. Each duo would walk into the team selecting area one-by-one. The captains would then decide if they want the duo in their team. In the case of only one captain wants the duo, the duo could join that team or rejecting the request and move to the "upheaval" area. The duo could either join a team or choose no team at all and move to the "upheaval" area. In the case no captains want the duo, they would automatically move to the "upheaval" area. After the process, the captains that haven't filled their team would select the remaining duo(s) to be on their team. The teams then compete in games to gain priority of choosing songs. Each team would select two songs to perform.

The teams and songs lineup are (captain's name are highlighted in bold, pairs are labelled by - ):

- "Lắm lúc" (Most of the times) and "Tín hiệu yêu" (Love sign): **Lyhan,** Tiên Tiên - Miu Lê, Bảo Anh - MaiQuinn
- "Cách điệu" (Style) (later changed the title to "Cách (yêu đúng) điệu" (How (to love) properly)) and "Bắc thang lên hỏi ông trời" (Go up the ladder to ask the Sky): **Bích Phương,** Mỹ Mỹ - Quỳnh Anh Shyn, Juky San - Lamoon
- **"Chẳng phải anh đâu" (Not you) and "Cứ đổ tại cơn mưa" (Blame it on the rain): Phương Ly,** Orange - Châu Bùi, 52Hz - Vũ Thảo My
- **"Bad liar" and "Duyên" (Fate): Lâm Bảo Ngọc,** Liu Grace - Saabirose, Phương Mỹ Chi - Pháo

The fourth Livestage was conducted through the hotchair format. Each team would give two performances with all of the members - instead of dividing them to perform one song like the second Livestage - in two different hotchair round. After each performance, audience would vote for each individual "em xinh" in the team, with the performance score being the total individual score of the team members in that specific hotchair round. The first performing team then sit in the hotchair. Every team that performs afterward must have a higher performance score than the hotchair team in order to be the new owner of the hotchair. The team that still seating at the hotchair by the end of each round are the winning team of that round, earning 20 points for each member's final individual score. In the end, the total points of the team are the sum of points from both performances. In the case if a team win both rounds, that team would automatically be safe, meaning every of its members would be safe from elimination no matter what. The two teams with the lowest score would have to eliminate two pairs of members with the lowest individual score combined from 4 pairs (total of four "em xinh" would be eliminated in this way). Two more "em xinh" with the lowest individual score (not including the already eliminated four prior) would also be eliminated.

Concluding Livestage 4, Lyhan's team and Phương Ly's team are the teams that won the two respective hotchairs round. As such, there are no safe teams, meaning all of the "em xinh" are nominated for elimination. However, all members of Lyhan's team progressed to the final after all the results were announced. Bích Phương's team and Lâm Bảo Ngọc's team are the bottom two teams, meaning each team have to eliminate a pair of "em xinh" with the lowest average score (the pairs are determined through the pairing process from the team choosing round), being Quỳnh Anh Shyn - Mỹ Mỹ (Bích Phương's team) and Saabirose - Liu Grace (Lâm Bảo Ngọc's team). Two more "em xinh" with the lowest individual scores (excluding the eliminated pairs) that got eliminated are Vũ Thảo My (Phương Ly's team) and Juky San (Bích Phương's team). However, a special rescue round was conducted to save one "em xinh" from getting eliminated. The team with the highest total score - being Lyhan's team - can rescue one out of six eliminated "em xinh" of this round to move on to the finale. They decided to save Saabirose from elimination. Then, a voting round was conducted to resurrect one more "em xinh". The 15 finalist "em xinh" would vote for the 15 already eliminated "em xinh" to move on to the finale (including the "em xinh" that were eliminated prior). Juky San was the one that were resurrected through this process, with 8 votes in total. In total, four "em xinh" were officially eliminated, being: Liu Grace (Lâm Bảo Ngọc's team), Quỳnh Anh Shyn, Mỹ Mỹ (Bích Phương's team) and Vũ Thảo My (Phương Ly's team).

Livestage 4
Episode 8 (2/8/2025)
First Hotchair round
Team	Performance order	Song [English translation] (Credits)	Members					Performance vote		
Phương Ly	1	"Chẳng phải anh đâu" [Not you] (RedT, Gxxfy, Tieman, Tinle, Minsicko, Orange, Vũ Thảo My, 52Hz)	**Phương Ly**					1140		
Phương Ly	1	"Chẳng phải anh đâu" [Not you] (RedT, Gxxfy, Tieman, Tinle, Minsicko, Orange, Vũ Thảo My, 52Hz)	Orange					1140		
Phương Ly	1	"Chẳng phải anh đâu" [Not you] (RedT, Gxxfy, Tieman, Tinle, Minsicko, Orange, Vũ Thảo My, 52Hz)	Vũ Thảo My					1140		
Phương Ly	1	"Chẳng phải anh đâu" [Not you] (RedT, Gxxfy, Tieman, Tinle, Minsicko, Orange, Vũ Thảo My, 52Hz)	Châu Bùi					1140		
Phương Ly	1	"Chẳng phải anh đâu" [Not you] (RedT, Gxxfy, Tieman, Tinle, Minsicko, Orange, Vũ Thảo My, 52Hz)	52Hz					1140		
Bích Phương	2	"Bắc thang lên hỏi ông trời" [Go up the ladder to ask the Sky] (Di Di, Masew, DJ Feliks, Mary, Lamoon)	**Bích Phương**					1094		
Bích Phương	2	"Bắc thang lên hỏi ông trời" [Go up the ladder to ask the Sky] (Di Di, Masew, DJ Feliks, Mary, Lamoon)	Mỹ Mỹ					1094		
Bích Phương	2	"Bắc thang lên hỏi ông trời" [Go up the ladder to ask the Sky] (Di Di, Masew, DJ Feliks, Mary, Lamoon)	Quỳnh Anh Shyn					1094		
Bích Phương	2	"Bắc thang lên hỏi ông trời" [Go up the ladder to ask the Sky] (Di Di, Masew, DJ Feliks, Mary, Lamoon)	Juky San					1094		
Bích Phương	2	"Bắc thang lên hỏi ông trời" [Go up the ladder to ask the Sky] (Di Di, Masew, DJ Feliks, Mary, Lamoon)	Lamoon					1094		
Lyhan	3	"Lắm lúc" [Most of the times] (Jabb Võ (Tổng Đài), BeeBB, Sonny Ngo, Minsicko, Tiên Tiên, MaiQuinn, Lyhan)	Tiên Tiên					**1161**		
Lyhan	3	"Lắm lúc" [Most of the times] (Jabb Võ (Tổng Đài), BeeBB, Sonny Ngo, Minsicko, Tiên Tiên, MaiQuinn, Lyhan)	Miu Lê					**1161**		
Lyhan	3	"Lắm lúc" [Most of the times] (Jabb Võ (Tổng Đài), BeeBB, Sonny Ngo, Minsicko, Tiên Tiên, MaiQuinn, Lyhan)	Bảo Anh					**1161**		
Lyhan	3	"Lắm lúc" [Most of the times] (Jabb Võ (Tổng Đài), BeeBB, Sonny Ngo, Minsicko, Tiên Tiên, MaiQuinn, Lyhan)	MaiQuinn					**1161**		
Lyhan	3	"Lắm lúc" [Most of the times] (Jabb Võ (Tổng Đài), BeeBB, Sonny Ngo, Minsicko, Tiên Tiên, MaiQuinn, Lyhan)	**Lyhan**					**1161**		
Lâm Bảo Ngọc	4	"Bad Liar" (Belle MJ, BWGW, Anh Bùi, Minsicko, Gxxfy, ducnn, DTAP, Lâm Bảo Ngọc, Liu Grace, Saabirose, Phương Mỹ Chi, Pháo Northside)	**Lâm Bảo Ngọc**					1159		
Lâm Bảo Ngọc	4	"Bad Liar" (Belle MJ, BWGW, Anh Bùi, Minsicko, Gxxfy, ducnn, DTAP, Lâm Bảo Ngọc, Liu Grace, Saabirose, Phương Mỹ Chi, Pháo Northside)	Liu Grace					1159		
Lâm Bảo Ngọc	4	"Bad Liar" (Belle MJ, BWGW, Anh Bùi, Minsicko, Gxxfy, ducnn, DTAP, Lâm Bảo Ngọc, Liu Grace, Saabirose, Phương Mỹ Chi, Pháo Northside)	Saabirose					1159		
Lâm Bảo Ngọc	4	"Bad Liar" (Belle MJ, BWGW, Anh Bùi, Minsicko, Gxxfy, ducnn, DTAP, Lâm Bảo Ngọc, Liu Grace, Saabirose, Phương Mỹ Chi, Pháo Northside)	Phương Mỹ Chi					1159		
Lâm Bảo Ngọc	4	"Bad Liar" (Belle MJ, BWGW, Anh Bùi, Minsicko, Gxxfy, ducnn, DTAP, Lâm Bảo Ngọc, Liu Grace, Saabirose, Phương Mỹ Chi, Pháo Northside)	Pháo					1159		
Second Hotchair round
Team	Performance order	Song [English translation] (Credits)	Members	Individual votes	#	Individual score	#	Performance votes	Total votes	Result
Lâm Bảo Ngọc	1	"Duyên" [Fate] (Novasquad, CM1X, DTAP, Thyself (INUS), Upin (INUS), Phương Mỹ Chi, Pháo Northside)	**Lâm Bảo Ngọc**	478	3	478	6	1113	2272	Safe
Lâm Bảo Ngọc	1	"Duyên" [Fate] (Novasquad, CM1X, DTAP, Thyself (INUS), Upin (INUS), Phương Mỹ Chi, Pháo Northside)	Liu Grace	427	16	427	17	1113	2272	Eliminated
Lâm Bảo Ngọc	1	"Duyên" [Fate] (Novasquad, CM1X, DTAP, Thyself (INUS), Upin (INUS), Phương Mỹ Chi, Pháo Northside)	Saabirose	430	15	430	16	1113	2272	Saved
Lâm Bảo Ngọc	1	"Duyên" [Fate] (Novasquad, CM1X, DTAP, Thyself (INUS), Upin (INUS), Phương Mỹ Chi, Pháo Northside)	Phương Mỹ Chi	483	1	483	4	1113	2272	Safe
Lâm Bảo Ngọc	1	"Duyên" [Fate] (Novasquad, CM1X, DTAP, Thyself (INUS), Upin (INUS), Phương Mỹ Chi, Pháo Northside)	Pháo	454	9	454	12	1113	2272	Safe
Bích Phương	2	"Cách (yêu đúng) điệu" [How (to love) properly] (Jaysonlei, Ánh Sáng AZA, Minsicko, J4RDIN, DuongK, Bích Phương, Mỹ Mỹ, Quỳnh Anh Shyn, Juky San)	**Bích Phương**	470	6	470	10	1088	2182	Safe
Bích Phương	2	"Cách (yêu đúng) điệu" [How (to love) properly] (Jaysonlei, Ánh Sáng AZA, Minsicko, J4RDIN, DuongK, Bích Phương, Mỹ Mỹ, Quỳnh Anh Shyn, Juky San)	Mỹ Mỹ	424	17	424	19	1088	2182	Eliminated
Bích Phương	2	"Cách (yêu đúng) điệu" [How (to love) properly] (Jaysonlei, Ánh Sáng AZA, Minsicko, J4RDIN, DuongK, Bích Phương, Mỹ Mỹ, Quỳnh Anh Shyn, Juky San)	Quỳnh Anh Shyn	416	20	416	20	1088	2182	Eliminated
Bích Phương	2	"Cách (yêu đúng) điệu" [How (to love) properly] (Jaysonlei, Ánh Sáng AZA, Minsicko, J4RDIN, DuongK, Bích Phương, Mỹ Mỹ, Quỳnh Anh Shyn, Juky San)	Juky San	422	18-19	422	18	1088	2182	Resurrected
Bích Phương	2	"Cách (yêu đúng) điệu" [How (to love) properly] (Jaysonlei, Ánh Sáng AZA, Minsicko, J4RDIN, DuongK, Bích Phương, Mỹ Mỹ, Quỳnh Anh Shyn, Juky San)	Lamoon	450	12	450	14	1088	2182	Safe
Episode 11 (9/8/2025)
Lyhan	3	"Tín hiệu yêu" [Love sign] (Novasquad, Neural, BeeBB, Minsicko, Tiên Tiên, MaiQuinn, Lyhan)	Tiên Tiên	452	11	472	9	1115	**2376**	Safe
Lyhan	3	"Tín hiệu yêu" [Love sign] (Novasquad, Neural, BeeBB, Minsicko, Tiên Tiên, MaiQuinn, Lyhan)	Miu Lê	453	10	473	8	1115	**2376**	Safe
Lyhan	3	"Tín hiệu yêu" [Love sign] (Novasquad, Neural, BeeBB, Minsicko, Tiên Tiên, MaiQuinn, Lyhan)	Bảo Anh	441	13	461	11	1115	**2376**	Safe
Lyhan	3	"Tín hiệu yêu" [Love sign] (Novasquad, Neural, BeeBB, Minsicko, Tiên Tiên, MaiQuinn, Lyhan)	MaiQuinn	455	8	475	7	1115	**2376**	Safe
Lyhan	3	"Tín hiệu yêu" [Love sign] (Novasquad, Neural, BeeBB, Minsicko, Tiên Tiên, MaiQuinn, Lyhan)	**Lyhan**	475	4	495	2	1115	**2376**	Safe
Phương Ly	4	"Cứ đổ tại cơn mưa" [Blame it on the rain] (Trid Minh, Sonny Ngo, Wokeup, N.T.B, Orange, 52Hz)	**Phương Ly**	482	2	502	1	**1131**	2371	Safe
Phương Ly	4	"Cứ đổ tại cơn mưa" [Blame it on the rain] (Trid Minh, Sonny Ngo, Wokeup, N.T.B, Orange, 52Hz)	Orange	460	7	480	5	**1131**	2371	Safe
Phương Ly	4	"Cứ đổ tại cơn mưa" [Blame it on the rain] (Trid Minh, Sonny Ngo, Wokeup, N.T.B, Orange, 52Hz)	Vũ Thảo My	422	18-19	442	15	**1131**	2371	Eliminated
Phương Ly	4	"Cứ đổ tại cơn mưa" [Blame it on the rain] (Trid Minh, Sonny Ngo, Wokeup, N.T.B, Orange, 52Hz)	Châu Bùi	433	14	453	13	**1131**	2371	Safe
Phương Ly	4	"Cứ đổ tại cơn mưa" [Blame it on the rain] (Trid Minh, Sonny Ngo, Wokeup, N.T.B, Orange, 52Hz)	52Hz	474	5	494	3	**1131**	2371	Safe

Team captain

Highest point performance of the night

Highest total score

Total individual score of pairs in the bottom two teams: Mỹ Mỹ - Quỳnh Anh Shyn (Bích Phương's team - 840), Liu Grace - Saabirose (Lâm Bảo Ngọc's team - 857), Lamoon - Juky San (Bích Phương's team - 872), Phương Mỹ Chi - Pháo (Lâm Bảo Ngọc's team - 937)

=== Livestage 5 ===
This is the final round of Em xinh "say hi". 16 finalist were divided into 4 four-members teams. The four em xinh with the highest individual scores - Phương Ly, Lyhan, 52Hz and Phương Mỹ Chi - were the captains. Each captain then creates a slogan for themselves and a representative color. The rest of the cast then vote for 2 out of 4 captains based on the slogan and color, without knowing the captain's identity. The process of choosing teams were through the process of anonymous phone calling.

- First round of calling: Based on the voting for each captain, they may call for 3 "em xinh" from the "em xinh"s that they think voted for them, through identifying the number tied to a cast member - being their ranking from last performance round (the captains had no idea about the rest of the cast's rankings). If they recall the number correctly, they may call that "em xinh" (both of them were not told who exactly are on the other line). If they recall the number incorrectly or recall a number tied to an "em xinh" that either joined a team or go to the "Upheaval" area, they would lose the calling opportunity and move back to the end of the calling line until they successfully recall a correct number. The selected "em xinh" then decided if they want to join the team they got called or move to the "Upheaval" area.
- Second round of calling: Two remaining "em xinh" (those who haven't got called in the last round) with the highest rank and two with the lowest rank would call a captain they want to join, without knowing who they are calling (the only clue is the color the captains have chosen prior). They then persuade the captain to let them join the team. If successful, they join their team. If not, they move to the "Upheavel" area.
- Third round of calling: The captains now have the number/ranking of the rest of the cast. They then call an "em xinh" they want to have on their team. That "em xinh" may not reject the captain's request.
- "Upheaval" area's calling round: The remaining "em xinh" that are still in the "Upheaval" area would then call a captain they want to join, that captain may not reject the "em xinh"'s request (unless their team are full).

Every teams would participate in games to gain priority in selecting the demos. The teams and songs for this round are:

- **Đầu mèo đuôi chuột (A cat's brain with a rat's tail): Phương Ly,** Tiên Tiên, Miu Lê, MaiQuinn
- **Hourglass: Lyhan,** Châu Bùi, Juky San, Saabirose
- **Tadida: 52Hz,** Bích Phương, Bảo Anh, Lâm Bảo Ngọc
- **Morse code: Phương Mỹ Chi,** Orange, Pháo, Lamoon

Each "em xinh" would perform two acts in the finale, a solo and a group performance.

For the finale round, the voting now in the hands of home audience through the VieOn app, where they vote for the "em xinh"s from 23:00 9/8/2025 to 22:00 23/8/2025. In the live finale episode, 5 "em xinh" with the most votes would form an "all-rounder girl group". The group lineup created through this form of voting consists of: Bích Phương, Lamoon, Orange, Lyhan (Runner-up) and Phương Mỹ Chi (winner).

Furthermore, six sub-awards was given to individuals and groups, consists of:

- The Best Leader - most favorite team captain (voted by the cast members) - given to Bích Phương
- The Best Transformation - "em xinh" with the most impressive transformation - given to Phương Ly
- The Best Performer - "em xinh" with the most impressive performance skill - given to Ánh Sáng AZA
- The Best Group Performance - the most creative performance - given to "AAA" - Army 2 (Tiên Tiên, Lâm Bảo Ngọc, Châu Bùi, MaiQuinn, Juky San, Yeolan, Lyhan, Tao Yi A1J, 52Hz, Han Sara, Muộii, Phương Mỹ Chi, Pháo, Danmy and Ánh Sáng AZA)
- The Best Hit - Most listened and streamed performance - given to "Không đau nữa rồi" (No more pain) - 52Hz, Mỹ Mỹ, Châu Bùi, Orange, Pháp Kiều
- The Best Music Creative Artist - "em xinh" with the most impressive music creative skill - given to 52Hz (Note: Châu Bùi received this sub-award on behalf of 52Hz - who could not attend the live ceremony due to private reason)

Livestage 5: Finale
Episode 12 - Solo performances - Part 1 (16/8/2025)
Performance order		Song [English translation] (Credits)	Guest feature/guest vocal (if applicable)	Em xinh	Votes	Debut result (Note: The result in this table would either mark as "debut" or "debut unsuccessfully (top 10/16)", based on if that "em xinh" debuted or not. There are 5 "em xinh" that debuted.)	#
1		"Lời thú tội" [Confession] (Saabirose, Kado)	Tez	Saabirose	Not public	Unsuccessful	11-16
2		"Ái kỷ" [Narcissistic] (J4RDIN, Dlight, LV.KhanhHung)	N/A	Lâm Bảo Ngọc	Not public	Unsuccessful	6-10
3		"Trời sao" [Starry sky] (52Hz, Đoàn Minh Vũ)	N/A	52Hz	Not public	Unsuccessful	6-10
4		"Ếch ngoài đáy giếng" [Frog outside the well] (Phương Mỹ Chi, DTAP, Billy, Vừng A Dính, Aki, Chuột Sấm Sét, Upin (INUS)	N/A	Phương Mỹ Chi	779.290	Successful	1
5		"Dương gian" [Human's world] (Lamoon, JustaTee)	N/A	Lamoon	306.578	Successful	5
6		"Thao túng tâm lý" [Mind manipulation] (MaiQuinn, Pixel Neko)	N/A	MaiQuinn	Not public	Unsuccessful	11-16
7		"Người đầu tiên" [First person] (Juky San)	N/A	Juky San	Not public	Unsuccessful	11-16
8		"Cô ấy không yêu anh" [She doesn't love you] (Châu Đăng Khoa, Phúc Du, Minsicko)	Phúc Du	Bảo Anh	Not public	Unsuccessful	11-16
Episode 12 - Solo performances - Part 2 (17/8/2025)							
9		"Đan bàn tay" [Knitting hand] (Harosé, Binz, N.T.B)	Binz	Châu Bùi	Not public	Unsuccessful	11-16
10		"Lội ngược dòng" [Comeback] (Orange, J4RDIN, Wokeup, N.T.B)	N/A	Orange	347.037	Successful	4
11		"Live my way" (Tiên Tiên, Coldie, ducnn, Mikedeel)	Ánh Sáng AZA	Tiên Tiên	Not public	Unsuccessful	11-16
12		"Rơi tự do" [Freefall] (Lyhan, Trần Trọng Quỳnh, Lê Công Thành, Hồ Đắc Nhật Tân, Minh Đinh, Sir&Sage, Hooligan, Nguyễn Trọng Kha)	N/A	Lyhan	626.303	Successful	2
13		"Chu kỳ mới" [New cycle] (J4RDIN, DuongK)	N/A	Bích Phương	467.352	Successful	3
14		"Đi về" [Go back] (Pháo Northside, Machiot, DJ Feliks)	N/A	Pháo	Not public	Unsuccessful	6-10
15		"Em thích là được" [As long as I like it] (Tuno, CoolKid, OnlyC, Justin TechN9)	CoolKid, Trúc Nhân	Miu Lê	Not public	Unsuccessful	6-10
16		"Vỗ tay" [Clap your hands] (Trid Minh, Wokeup)	N/A	Phương Ly	Not public	Unsuccessful	6-10
Episode 15 – Live finale – Group performances (23/8/2025)
Team	Performance order	Song [English translation] (Credits)			Members		
Phương Ly	1	"Đầu mèo đuôi chuột" [A cat's brain with a rat's tail] (DC Tâm, Neural, Mew Amazing, DBaola)			**Phương Ly**		
Phương Ly	1	"Đầu mèo đuôi chuột" [A cat's brain with a rat's tail] (DC Tâm, Neural, Mew Amazing, DBaola)			Tiên Tiên		
Phương Ly	1	"Đầu mèo đuôi chuột" [A cat's brain with a rat's tail] (DC Tâm, Neural, Mew Amazing, DBaola)			Miu Lê		
Phương Ly	1	"Đầu mèo đuôi chuột" [A cat's brain with a rat's tail] (DC Tâm, Neural, Mew Amazing, DBaola)			MaiQuinn		
Phương Mỹ Chi	2	"Morse Code" (Novasquad, C Bảo, DTAP, Upin (INUS), Orange, Phương Mỹ Chi, Pháo Northside, Lamoon)			Orange		
Phương Mỹ Chi	2	"Morse Code" (Novasquad, C Bảo, DTAP, Upin (INUS), Orange, Phương Mỹ Chi, Pháo Northside, Lamoon)			**Phương Mỹ Chi**		
Phương Mỹ Chi	2	"Morse Code" (Novasquad, C Bảo, DTAP, Upin (INUS), Orange, Phương Mỹ Chi, Pháo Northside, Lamoon)			Pháo		
Phương Mỹ Chi	2	"Morse Code" (Novasquad, C Bảo, DTAP, Upin (INUS), Orange, Phương Mỹ Chi, Pháo Northside, Lamoon)			Lamoon		
Lyhan	3	"Hourglass" (Orange, Dreamble, Juky San, Lyhan, Saabirose)			Châu Bùi		
Lyhan	3	"Hourglass" (Orange, Dreamble, Juky San, Lyhan, Saabirose)			Juky San		
Lyhan	3	"Hourglass" (Orange, Dreamble, Juky San, Lyhan, Saabirose)			**Lyhan**		
Lyhan	3	"Hourglass" (Orange, Dreamble, Juky San, Lyhan, Saabirose)			Saabirose		
52Hz	4	"Tadida" (NamNam, Neural, Cheezebout, Minsicko, Bích Phương, 52Hz)			Bích Phương		
52Hz	4	"Tadida" (NamNam, Neural, Cheezebout, Minsicko, Bích Phương, 52Hz)			Bảo Anh		
52Hz	4	"Tadida" (NamNam, Neural, Cheezebout, Minsicko, Bích Phương, 52Hz)			Lâm Bảo Ngọc		
52Hz	4	"Tadida" (NamNam, Neural, Cheezebout, Minsicko, Bích Phương, 52Hz)			**52Hz**		
Guest/extra performances (Live TV)							
Performance order	Song [English translation] (Credits)				Performers		
1	"The Real Aura" (JustaTee, BeeBB, Minsicko, DBaola, Liu Grace, Tao Zi A1J, Pháo Northside, Saabirose, Danmy)				29 em xinh		
2	"Do anh si" [Because you're crazy over me] (Cheng, Tuấn Cry)				Han Sara		
3	"Starlight" (Yeolan, Muộii, Dreamble)				Ngô Lan Hương, Yeolan, Muộii, Ánh Sáng AZA		
4	"Làn ưu tiên" + "Bản thiết kế" [Priority lane + Blueprint] (HURRYKNG, Dương Domic, Minh Đinh, Banh, Sir Hoang, Quờ)				MOPIUS (Note: MOPIUS members: JSOL, Quang Hùng MasterD, HURRYKNG and Dương Domic.)		

Team captain

== Elimination table ==
Em xinh╲ Round	Livestage 1					Livestage 2		Livestage 3				Livestage 4				Livestage 5 (Finale)	
Em xinh╲ Round	Armies battle	Group battle	Individual vote	Total individual score	#	Result (individual vote)	#	Individual vote	Dance battle bonus	Result (total individual score)	#	Individual vote (Note: The number of votes was not shown on the program, it is calculated manually from the hot chair bonus and total individual score)	Hot chair bonus	Result (total individual score)	#	Votes (Note: The table displayed the ranking of the "em xinh" based on the final votes. They either display their specific rank (for top 5), or their ranking group (for top 10 and top 16))	# (Result)
Phương Mỹ Chi	50	100	251	401	1	Safe (231)	6	251	0	Safe (251)	12	483	0	Safe (483)	4	779 290	1st (Winner)
Lyhan	50	75	190	315	9	Safe (233)	5	271	25	Safe (296)	1	475	20	Safe (495)	2	626 303	2nd (Runner-up)
Bích Phương	0	100	259	359	4	Safe (234)	4	263	15	Safe (278)	2	470	0	Safe (470)	10	467 352	3rd (Best 5)
Orange	0	0	248	248	21	Safe (238)	2	247	0	Safe (247)	13	460	20	Safe (480)	5	347 037	4th (Best 5)
Lamoon	0	100	202	302	12	Safe (186)	23	243	0	Safe (243)	15-16	450	0	Safe (450)	14	306 578	5th (Best 5)
Phương Ly	0	0	249	249	20	Safe (224)	8	270	0	Safe (270)	4	482	20	Safe (502)	1	Not public	6th-10th (Top 10)
52Hz	50	75	254	379	2	Safe (241)	1	246	20	Safe (266)	7	474	20	Safe (494)	3	Not public	6th-10th (Top 10)
Lâm Bảo Ngọc	50	0	221	271	15	Safe (221)	10-11	253	20	Safe (273)	3	478	0	Safe (478)	6	Not public	6th-10th (Top 10)
Miu Lê	0	0	264	264	17	Safe (236)	3	238	15	Safe (253)	9-11	453	20	Safe (473)	8	Not public	6th-10th (Top 10)
Pháo	50	0	238	288	14	Safe (187)	22	244	20	Safe (264)	8	454	0	Safe (454)	12	Not public	6th-10th (Top 10)
MaiQuinn	50	50	214	314	10	Safe (201)	18	243	25	Safe (268)	6	455	20	Safe (475)	7	Not public	11th-16th (Top 16)
Tiên Tiên	50	100	227	377	3	Safe (223)	9	246	0	Safe (246)	14	452	20	Safe (472)	9	Not public	11th-16th (Top 16)
Bảo Anh	0	100	220	320	7	Safe (221)	10-11	240	0	Safe (240)	18	441	20	Safe (461)	11	Not public	11th-16th (Top 16)
Châu Bùi	50	75	202	327	5	Safe (170)	28	241	0	Safe (241)	17	433	20	Safe (453)	13	Not public	11th-16th (Top 16)
Saabirose	0	50	197	247	22	Safe (216)	13	243	0	Safe (243)	15-16	430	0	Saved (430)	16	Not public	11th-16th (Top 16)
Juky San	50	0	203	253	19	Safe (200)	19	238	15	Safe (253)	9-11	422	0	Resurrected (422)	19	Not public	11th-16th (Top 16)
Vũ Thảo My	0	0	212	212	28	Safe (207)	14-16	234	0	Safe (234)	20	422	20	Eliminated (442)	15		
Liu Grace	0	0	222	222	25	Safe (225)	7	228	25	Safe (253)	9-11	427	0	Eliminated (427)	17		
Mỹ Mỹ	0	0	218	218	26	Safe (197)	20	244	25	Safe (269)	5	424	0	Eliminated (424)	18		
Quỳnh Anh Shyn	0	0	215	215	27	Safe (207)	14-16	214	15	Safe (229)	22	416	0	Eliminated (416)	20		
Ánh Sáng AZA	50	75	201	326	6	Safe (217)	12	235	0	Eliminated (235)	19						
Tao Yi A1J	50	50	191	291	13	Safe (207)	14-16	213	20	Eliminated (233)	21						
Han Sara	50	0	220	270	16	Safe (189)	21	227	0	Eliminated (227)	23						
Muộii	50	50	218	318	8	Safe (205)	17	220	0	Eliminated (220)	24						
Yeolan	50	75	181	306	11	Eliminated (185)	24										
Ngô Lan Hương	0	50	210	260	18	Eliminated (183)	25										
Hoàng Duyên	0	0	179	179	29	Eliminated (178)	26										
Lyly	0	0	223	223	24	Eliminated (171)	27										
Danmy	50	0	196	246	23	Eliminated (166)	29										
Chi Xê	0	0	170	170	30	Eliminated (160)	30										

- “Em xinh” have debuted in the show
- "Em xinh" finished in the final 10
- "Em xinh" is a finalist/ finish in the final 16
- "Em xinh" was safe due to being in the safe team
- “Em xinh” was safe after the final results announcement
- "Em xinh" was eliminated
- "Em xinh" was originally eliminated but later resurrected/saved by the remaining cast
- “Em xinh” does not compete in the Livestage due to being eliminated prior
