= Lyly =

Lyly may refer to:

- John Lyly, English writer, playwright, courtier, and parliamentarian
- Lyly (singer), Vietnamese actress, singer, and songwriter
