= Châu Bùi =

Vietnamese model (born 1997)

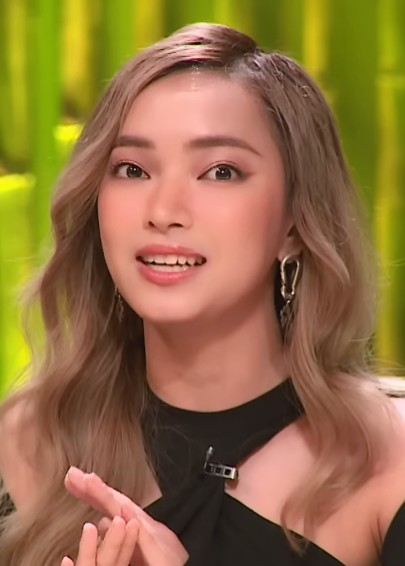
- Châu Bùi in 2021
- Born: Bùi Thái Bảo Châu; November 13, 1997 (age 28)
- Other name: Chou Chou
- Years active: 2015–present
- Height: 1.58 m (5 ft 2 in)
- Relatives: Linh Bùi (sister)
- Musical career
- Genres: V-pop
- Instrument: Vocals
- Website: chaubui.net

Bui Thai Bao Chau (born November 13, 1997), better known by her stage name Chau Bui, is a Vietnamese fashionista and model. She was previously featured on Forbes magazine's 30 Under 30 Asia list.

== Early life ==
Châu Bùi was born on November 13, 1997, in Hanoi to a family of civil servants. She was initially steered toward studying at the University of Commerce like her older sister; however, after graduating high school, Châu discovered a passion for fashion and asked her family for permission to pursue it, but faced opposition. She also spent some time selling coconut oil and opening a tutoring center. At age 17, she entered the modeling world by shooting for several fashion brands. In the beginning, Châu Bùi didn't stand out much, weighing only 39 kg and standing 1.58m tall. Because of this, Châu took up bodybuilding to improve her physique.

== Career ==
Tôi rất thích thay đổi, sự thay đổi khiến cuộc sống của mình không nhàm chán. Tôi thích gì thì sẽ thử, vì không thử thì sao biết mình có thích hay không, rồi có hợp không? Và phong cách thời trang cũng như con người tôi vậy, luôn đổi mới. (I love to change, the change doesn’t make my life boring. Whatever I like, I’ll try, because if I don’t try it, how do I know if I like it or not, and then it’s appropriate? And the fashion style is like me, always innovating.)

— Châu Bùi —

=== Building career ===
In 2015, Chau took a one-year leave of absence from Thuongmai University to try her hand in the fashion industry. She handed over the test prep center to her teacher and started modeling for fashion brands in Hanoi. Thanks to her unique style and look, she quickly became a familiar face in domestic fashion magazines and lookbooks.

In 2016, Chau attended Seoul Fashion Week and caught the attention of the fashion press, appearing in their magazines and social media outlets such as Vogue, Elle, Harper's Bazaar, and more.

=== First achievements ===
Following her breakout at Seoul Fashion Week in 2017, Chau won the "New Face" award at the 2016 WeChoice Awards and "Top Fashion Influencer" at the 2017 Influence Asia awards in Malaysia, while also making the top 4 for "Fashion & Breakout" at the same event. She later announced she would compete in The Face Vietnam but eventually withdrew, citing an inability to "properly arrange her personal affairs." In 2017, Chau had the opportunity to act, playing the antagonist in the feature film Jailbait (Em chưa 18) and appearing in the music video "Từ ngày em đến" by the group Da LAB. In 2018, she collaborated with Da LAB again for the "Thanh xuân" music video and was honored as the Young Style Innovator at the 2018 ELLE Style Awards by Elle Vietnam. In 2019, Elle Vietnam voted Chau as the Most Influential Personal Style on Social Media at the 2019 ELLE Style Awards.

=== Career development and involvement in the music industry ===
In 2020, Chau Bui attended Paris Fashion Week and was named one of the "10 High Fashion Influencers" by Forbes France. That same year, Chau became the first Vietnamese fashionista to sign advertising contracts with Dior and Louis Vuitton. At the end of 2020, she made her debut as a singer with the music video "Em la chau bau," collaborating with Tlinh and MCK. In 2021, Chau Bui teamed up with Hoang Dung for the music video "Goi nang mang ve." Also that year, she was one of three Vietnamese individuals selected by Forbes for the "30 Under 30 Asia" list—a list honoring those who have made significant contributions to society and the economy in the Asia-Pacific region. Previously, she served as an ambassador for several social programs such as "Kindness is Contagious," "No Thank 2020," and "Turn Off the Lights, Turn On Ideas 2021."

=== Return to fashion ===
In 2023, returning to fashion weeks after three years of the COVID-19 pandemic, Châu Bùi became the fashionista with the highest total media value in the world at the Fall/Winter 2023 Fashion Week, totaling $1.8 million. Châu Bùi appeared at 20 events and runways throughout the two weeks of Milan and Paris Fall/Winter Fashion Week 2023.

== Personal life ==
Châu Bùi was in a relationship with Decao (Cao Minh Thắng) starting in 2015, but the two later broke up in 2019.

In mid-2020, rumors began circulating that Châu Bùi and rapper Binz were dating, though neither confirmed nor denied the reports. The two later went public with their relationship at the 2022 Kosmik concert.

== Filmography ==
=== Films ===
Year	Film	Role	Ref
2017	Em chưa 18	Yến	
2020	Chị Mười Ba: 3 ngày sinh tử	Lyn	

=== Music videos ===
Year	Title	Artists	Role	Ref
2017	"Từ ngày em đến"	Da LAB	Diễn viên	
2017	"Khuôn mặt ta từng quen"	TomV ft. V.O.X	Diễn viên	
2018	"Never Drink Alone"	Only C	Diễn viên	
2018	"Thanh xuân"	Da LAB	Diễn viên	
2018	"Em đâu biết"	BigDaddy, SunD, Rhymastic	Diễn viên	
2020	"Cần gì hơn"	JustaTee, Tiên Tiên	Diễn viên	
2020	"No, thanks!"	Bùi Công Nam ft. Kimmese	Diễn viên	
2020	"Sáng mắt chưa Cô Vy"	Trúc Nhân, Chi Pu	Diễn viên	
2020	"Anh là gã ngốc"	Juun D	Diễn viên	
2021	"Ai nói"	Linh Cáo	Diễn viên	
2023	"Hit Me Up"	Binz ft. Nomovodka	Cameo	

=== TV shows ===
Year	Show	Role	Network	TK.
2018	Sao hỏa sao kim	Khách mời	HTV7	
2019	Khi chàng vào bếp	Người chơi	HTV7	
2019	Những cô nàng năng động	Khách mời	HTV7	
2019	Ô hay gì thế này	Người chơi	VTV3	
2021	HTV Chào Xuân	Khách mời	HTV9	
2021	Sóng 21	Đồng dẫn chuyện	HTV2	
2021	SV 2020–2021	Khách mời	VTV3	
2021	Cảm hứng bất tận	Khách mời	VTV1	
2021	Nhập gia tùy tục	Khách mời	VTV3	
2022	Khi ta 20	Khách mời	HTV7	
2023	Hành trình rực rỡ	Khách mời	VTV3	
2023	Người ấy là ai	Cố vấn khách mời	HTV2	
2025	Em xinh "say hi"	Thí sinh	HTV2	

=== Other projects ===
Year	Show	Role	Network	TK.
2025	Hành trình thanh âm	Thành viên chính	YouTube	

== Discography ==
As lead artist

Year	Title	Album	TK.
2020	"Em là châu báu" (với MCK, tlinh)	Non-album singles	
2025	"The Real Aura" (với 30 em xinh)	Trong Em xinh "say hi"	
2025	"AAA" (với Liên quân 2)	Trong Em xinh "say hi"	
2025	"Tone vào tim anh" (với 52Hz)	Non-album singles	
2025	"Run" (với Yeolan, Lyhan, 52Hz, Ánh Sáng AZA)	Trong Em xinh "say hi"	
2025	"Không đau nữa rồi" (với Mỹ Mỹ, Orange, 52Hz ft. Pháp Kiều)	Trong Em xinh "say hi"	
2025	"So đậm" (với Phương Ly, Vũ Thảo My, Muộii)	Trong Em xinh "say hi"	
2025	"Chẳng phải anh đâu" (với Phương Ly, Orange, Vũ Thảo My, 52Hz)	Trong Em xinh "say hi"	
2025	"Cứ đổ tại cơn mưa" (với Phương Ly, Orange, Vũ Thảo My, 52Hz)	Trong Em xinh "say hi"	
2025	"Đan bàn tay"	Trong Em xinh "say hi"	
2025	"Hourglass" (với Juky San, Lyhan, Saabirose)	Trong Em xinh "say hi"	
2025	"Cứ thế ta đi" (với Ngô Lan Hương, Rio, buitruonglinh, Hải Đăng Doo, 52Hz, Ánh Sáng AZA)	Trong Hành trình thanh âm	
2025	"Nắm bên anh" (với buitruonglinh)	Trong Hành trình thanh âm	
2025	"Mùa thu cho em" (với Ánh Sáng AZA)	Trong Hành trình thanh âm	

As featured artist

Year	Title	TK.
2020	"Chốt luôn tôi ở nhà" (Only C ft. Châu Bùi & Karik)	
2021	"Gói nắng mang về" (Hoàng Dũng ft. Châu Bùi)	
2022	"Sunkissed" (Chillies ft. Châu Bùi)	
2026	"Được không?" (Binz ft. Châu Bùi)	

== Magazines ==
Year	Magazine	Issue	TK.
2017	Đẹp	11	
2017	Travellive	12	
2018	Her World	08	
2018	Harper’s Bazaar	09	
2018	Đẹp	09	
2018	L'Officiel Vietnam	02	
2018	Wanderlust	10	
2018	ELLE	11	
2019	Harper’s Bazaar	07	
2019	L'Officiel Vietnam	08	
2019	Đẹp	09	
2019	ELLE	11	
2020	Đẹp	03	
2020	ELLE	10	

== Awards and nominations ==
Year	Award	Category	Nomination	Result	TK.
2016	WeChoice Awards	New Face	Bản thân	Won	
2017	Influence Asia	Top Fashion Influencer	Bản thân	Won	
2018	Elle Style Awards	Young Style Innovator	Bản thân	Won	
2018	WeChoice Awards	Top 10 nhân vật truyền cảm hứng	Bản thân	Won	
2019	Elle Style Awards	Người có phong cách cá nhân ảnh hưởng trên mạng xã hội nhất	Bản thân	Won	
2019	Ngôi sao của năm	Ngôi sao phong cách	Bản thân	Nominated	
2020	Ngôi sao của năm	Mỹ nhân của năm	Bản thân	Nominated	
2020	WeChoice Awards	Nghệ sĩ có hoạt động nổi bật	Bản thân	Nominated	
2022	Women of Our Time	Women of Fashion	Bản thân	Won	
2022	Ngôi sao của năm	Fashion Icon	Bản thân	Nominated	
2024	Elle Beauty Awards	Hình thể đẹp nhất của năm	Bản thân	Won	
2024	Vạn Xuân Awards	Đại sứ quảng cáo ấn tượng nhất	Bản thân	Nominated	
2024	Đẹp Awards	The Cover Girl	Bản thân	Won	
2025	L'Officiel Beauty Choice Awards	Cảm hứng làm đẹp của năm (Nữ)	Bản thân	Nominated	
2025	Vietnam iContent Awards	Nhà sáng tạo nội dung của năm	Bản thân	Nominated	
2025	WeChoice Awards	Bài hát của năm	"Không đau nữa rồi"	Nominated	
