= Lyly (singer) =

Vietnamese singer-songwriter (born 1996)

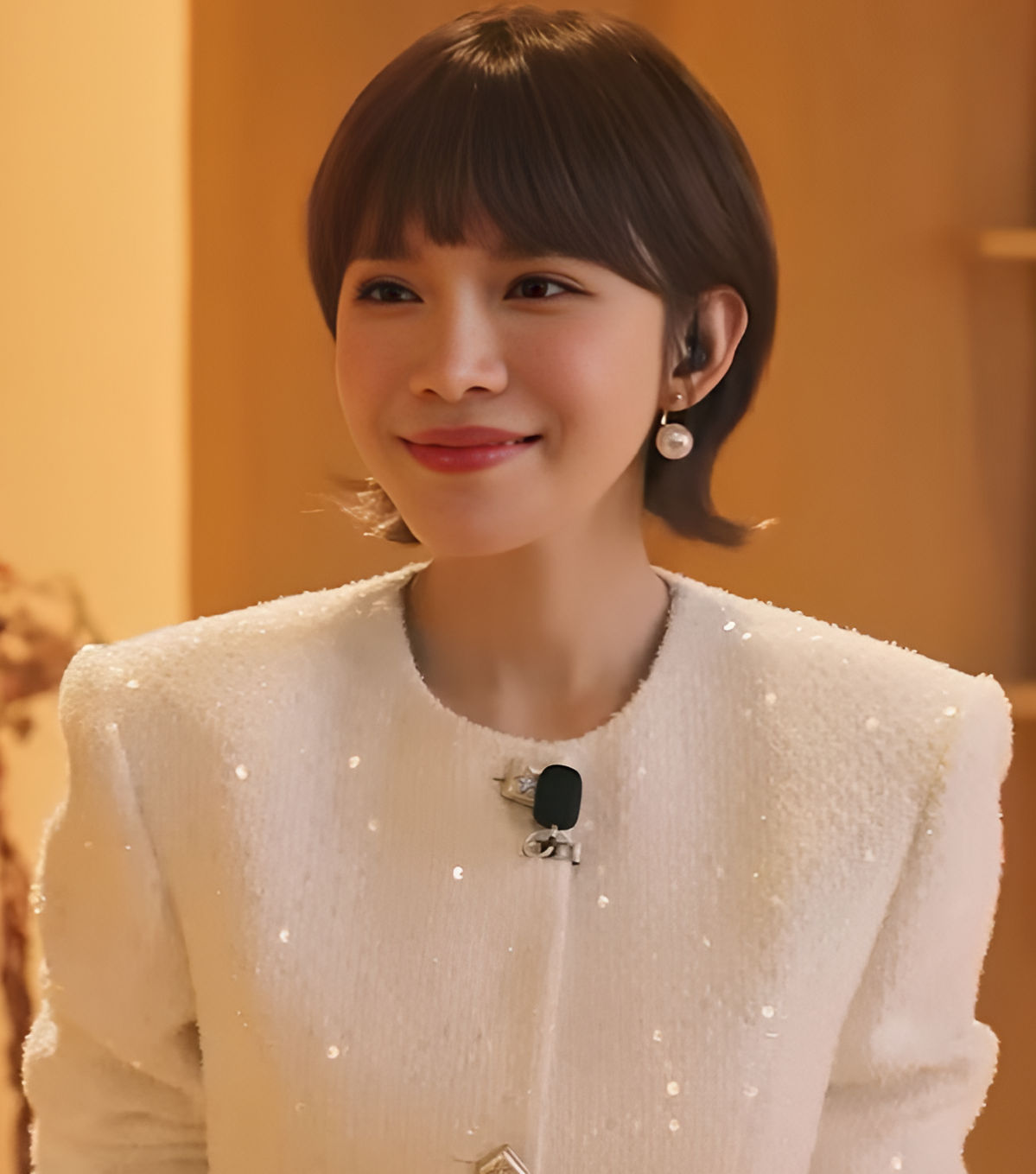
- Lyly in 2025
- Born: Nguyễn Hoàng Lan (Note: Most current sources, including her personal Facebook profile, refer to her original name as "Nguyễn Hoàng Ly.")
- Years active: 2018–present
- Musical career
- Origin: Hồ Chí Minh City, Vietnam
- Genres: V-pop; R&B
- Instruments: Vocals; guitar

Nguyễn Hoàng Lan (born January 1, 1996), better known by her stage name Lyly (stylized as LyLy), is a Vietnamese actress, singer and songwriter. She first gained widespread recognition with her song "24h" (2018).

== Career ==
In 2016, Lyly was one of three contestants in the group Cánh Diều competing in the second season of The X Factor Vietnam; the group was eliminated during the battle rounds. Afterward, she participated in the "Hello Yellow Girl Band Search" and became one of the group's three members. However, the band did not last long. In 2017, she and Huỳnh Thị Kim Hoàng used the joint stage name Kily and posted several song covers online. In 2018, she competed in Sing My Song but was eliminated in the battle round and did not make a significant impression.

In late 2018, Nguyen Hoang Lan debuted the song "24h" under the stage name Lyly. The song reached 10 million views within a month and was considered a musical phenomenon at the time. In 2019, the female singer released her second musical project titled "Khong yeu dung gay thuong nho" and composed the songs "Anh nha o dau the," "Den da khong duong" (for Amee), and "Khong sao ma, em day roi" (for Suni Ha Linh and Lou Hoang). She was nominated for New Artist of the Year at the Dedication Music Awards and Best New Face at the Làn Sóng Xanh Awards, while the song "Anh nha o dau the" was nominated for Song of the Year at the Dedication Music Awards. In 2020, Lyly collaborated with Hieuthuhai on the song "Loi duong mat." The song helped Hieuthuhai reach the finals of King of Rap 2020. At the 2020 Làn Sóng Xanh Awards, Lyly, along with Amee, Hua Kim Tuyen, TDK, and rapper Ricky Star, won the "Best Collaboration of the Year" category for the song "Sao anh chua ve nha."

In 2021, Lyly appeared as a guest on the show "Spring, Summer, Autumn, Winter, and Spring Again," released the music video "People Don't Love Me," and participated in the game show "Dance Arena" but withdrew for health reasons. In 2022, Lyly released the song "Neighbor" in collaboration with Anh Tu and "Heartbreak Usually Makes You Mean" featuring Ricky Star, and returned as a guest for the second season of "Spring, Summer, Autumn, Winter, and Spring Again." In 2023, Lyly joined the Chinese TV show "The Next Stage" (reaching the top 13) and released the EP "Lovely" featuring five love songs: "Hibernation," "Please Let Me Apologize," "Why Did You Say Yes," "Love Is So Cute," and "The Sun Shines After the Rain." In 2024, she released the song "Thank You for Not Waiting for Me," inspired by the movie "Mai."

In 2025, Lyly joined 29 other female artists in the first season of the show Em xinh "say hi", but was eliminated very early on. After the competition, she and Danmy released the song "Em không trách anh đâu". In early 2026, she made her film debut playing the role of Hai Linh in the movie Thỏ ơi!!.

== Discography ==
=== Albums ===
- Lovely (2023)

=== Singles ===
==== As lead artist ====
- "24h" (hợp tác với Magazine) (2018)
- "Không yêu đừng gây thương nhớ" (với Karik) (2019)
- "Tuy xa mà gần tuy gần mà xa" (với Anh Tú) (2020)
- "Bởi vì là khi yêu" (2020)
- "The last single" (với Orange) (2020)
- "Lời đường mật" (với Hieuthuhai) (2020)
- "Người ta đâu thương em" (2021)
- "Vì em là con gái (2021)
- "Vì làn hương ấy" (2021)
- "Yêu anh nhất đời" (2021)
- "Hàng xóm" (với Anh Tú) (2022)
- "Thất tình thường xấu tính" (với Ricky Star) (2022)
- "Cảm ơn vì đã không đợi em" (2024)
- "Em không trách anh đâu" (với Danmy) (2025)

==== As featured artist ====
- "1402 yêu ai phải nói" (nhiều nghệ sĩ) (2020)
- "Nếu ta không may" (Anh Tú hợp tác với Lyly) (2020)

=== Songwriting ===
Lyly has composed several songs for other singers:

- "Anh nhà ở đâu thế" (Amee and B Ray)
- "Đen đá không đường" (Amee)
- "Không sao mà, em đây rồi" (Suni Hạ Linh ft. Lou Hoàng)
- "Missing you" (Phương Ly and Tinle)
- "Một mình có buồn không" (Thiều Bảo Trâm ft. Hoàng)
- "Nếu anh không phiền" (Kaity Nguyễn)
- "Sao anh chưa về nhà" (Amee)
- "Sau ngần ấy năm" (Hà Nhi)
- "ThichThich" (Phương Ly)
- "Từng là của nhau" (Bảo Anh ft. Táo)
- "Yêu thầm" (Hoàng Yến Chibi ft. Tlinh and TDK)

== Filmography ==
Year	Title	Role	Notes	Ref
2026	Thỏ ơi!!	Hải Linh	—N/a	

== Awards and nominations ==
Awards	Year	Category	Nomination	Result	Ref
Giải thưởng Cống hiến	2020	Song of the Year	"Anh nhà ở đâu thế"	Nominated	
Giải thưởng Cống hiến	2020	Best New Artist	Bản thân	Nominated	
Làn Sóng Xanh	2019	Best New Artist	Bản thân	Nominated	
Làn Sóng Xanh	2019	Top 10 favorite songs	"Anh nhà ở đâu thế"	Won	
Làn Sóng Xanh	2020	Excellent collaboration	"Sao anh chưa về nhà" (với Amee, Hứa Kim Tuyền, TDK, Ricky Star)	Won	
MTV Fan Choice	2021	Best Music Release	"Yêu thầm" (với Hoàng Yến Chibi, tlinh, TDK)	Nominated	
Zing Music Awards	2019	Breakthrough of the Year	Bản thân	Nominated	

=== Achievements ===
- The "Most Impressive Performance" award for the medley "Lời tỏ tình dễ thương 1&2" with Hoàng Hải, Lâm Bảo Ngọc, and Mai Tiến Dũng on the show Our Song Vietnam 2024..
