= Làn Sóng Xanh Music Awards 2025 =

Vietnamese music awards ceremony

- Description: Các ca sĩ, nhạc sĩ có đóng góp cho nền âm nhạc Việt Nam
- Date: 30 tháng 1 năm 2026
- Venue: Hòa Bình, Ho Chi Minh City
- Country: Vietnam
- Presented by: Ho Chi Minh City Radio and Television
- Hosted by: Tuyền Tăng; Gil Lê
- Preshow hosts: Nicky; Thầy Beo U40

Highlights
- Most wins: Hòa Minzy (6)
- Most nominations: Hòa Minzy (8)

Television/radio coverage
- Network: YouTube và Fanpage Làn Sóng Xanh

The 2025 Làn Sóng Xanh Music Awards was the 28th edition of the Làn Sóng Xanh Music Awards, an annual music award founded by the Voice of the People of Ho Chi Minh City (VOH) and co-organized by VietNam Event Group (VEG). This is the first year the award is organized under the management of Ho Chi Minh City Radio and Television (HTV), after VOH was officially merged into HTV from October 2025. The main theme for this season is "Descendants of the Dragon and the Immortal".

The awards ceremony was held on January 30, 2026, at Hoa Binh Theatre, Ho Chi Minh City. With six awards in total, Hoa Minzy was the artist with the most titles of the season.

== Organization ==
=== Nomination process ===
A total of 106 songs that appeared on the weekly chart of Lan Song Xanh from December 13, 2024, to December 15, 2025, were eligible to compete for the award. Among them, Hoa Minzy's "Bac Bling" set a record for the most weeks the song stayed on the chart in the history of the award with 41 consecutive weeks in the top 10 and 13 weeks at number 1. Phuong My Chi became the artist with the most songs on the Lan Song Xanh chart with 13 songs, while "Viet Tiep Cau Chuyen Hoa Binh" was the song with the most different versions ever appearing on the chart with three versions by Nguyen Duyen Quynh, the duet Dong Hung - Vo Ha Tram and Tung Duong.

=== Selection process ===
The 2025 Green Wave Awards had 16 awards given out in the main categories, with the "Favorite Soundtrack Song" category being added back to the awards system after several seasons of absence.

=== Voting process ===
Online voting continues to be implemented on the 1Vote platform for the most popular male, female, and rapper categories. Based on the list of artists whose songs are on the weekly charts, the audience participates in voting through three rounds to determine the Top 10, Top 5, and the winner in each category. After round 1, the 10 artists with the most votes from each chart will be awarded commemorative medals to honor them.

== Reception ==
After the awards ceremony, DTAP's victory with the album Made in Vietnam in the "Album of the Year" category created many mixed opinions among fans, as the album was considered to have not left a prominent mark musically compared to the other four works in the nominations. Many viewers also expressed regret and dissatisfaction for Phung Khanh Linh, whose album Among Ten Thousand People was well-regarded both professionally and in terms of digital music achievements, but could not go home with any title. The award organizers stated that Made in Vietnam won thanks to the "cultural identity and orientation" elements shown through the album, and also fully met the criteria set by the category.

Phuong My Chi's mashup performance of the two songs "Bong Phu Hoa" and "Ech Ngoai Day Gieng" has raised many questions surrounding the copying of Jennie's stage ideas at the Melon Music Awards 2025, from the staging, layout to the stage design. In response to this, Chi posted an apology on her personal page about the audience's incomplete experience with the performance and affirmed that the association with the images of other artists was not part of the "uniqueness" she wanted to achieve, but did not explain anything further about the idea for the performance. Meanwhile, Nguyen Duyen Quynh's performance of the song "Viet Tiep Cau Chuyen Hoa Binh" was also said to have lip-syncing signs, after which the female singer admitted to this unintentional incident and said she would learn from it.
