= 52Hz =

Vietnamese singer-songwriter (born 1999)

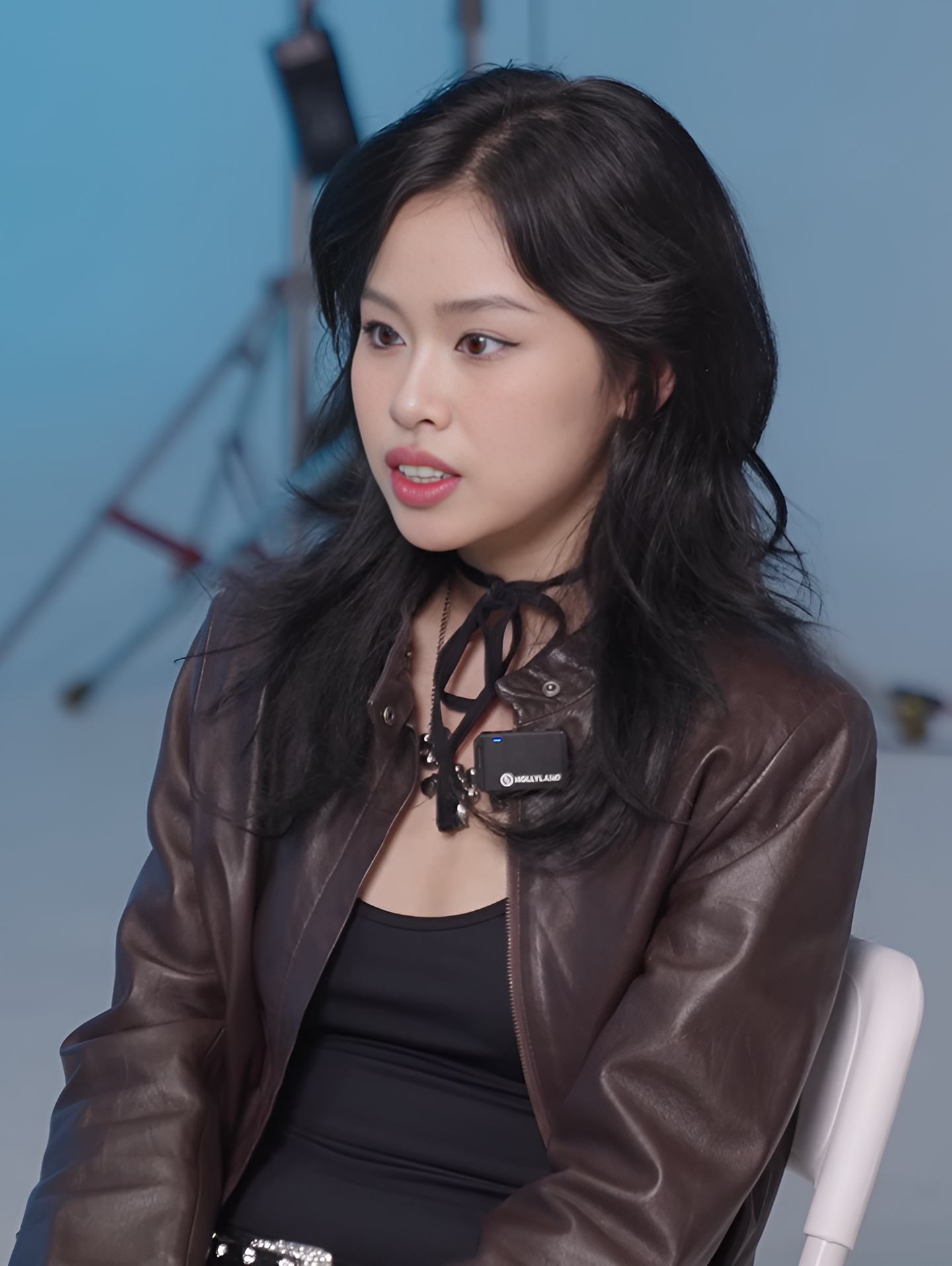
- 52Hz in 2024
- Born: Trần Thị Phương Thảo; 10 June 1999 (age 27); Hai Phong, Vietnam
- Years active: 2022–present
- Spouse: RIO (m. 2025)
- Mother: Phan Minh Hằng
- Relatives: Đoàn Minh Vũ (brother)
- Musical career
- Genres: V-pop; R&B; Trap-soul
- Instruments: Giọng hát; guitar
- Label: DAO Music Entertainment

Trần Thị Phương Thảo (born 10 June 1999), known by her stage name, 52Hz is a Vietnamese singer-songwriter.

== Life and career ==
=== 1999–2021: Early life ===
Trần Thị Phương Thảo was born on 10 June 1999, in Hai Phong, into a family where her father was absent. Her mother, Phan Minh Hằng, is a music teacher, while her cousin is music producer Đoàn Minh Vũ. From a young age, she showed an early passion for music and was encouraged by her mother, but because she felt she wasn't destined for the arts, she had to set this interest aside. 52Hz described her childhood as a gloomy and silent period due to changes in her living environment and the impact of her family situation. She attended Ngô Quyền High School and was later guided by her mother to become a teacher. At the university level, she chose to study in Major in English and graduated in 2023.

At the invitation of rapper Seachains in 2018, 52Hz, then using the stage name Alice, featured on his track "Room." In July 2019, 52Hz auditioned for Quyen Linh's upcoming group, O2O Girl Band, where she received performance training. Following the competition, she joined three other members—Lyhan, Lily, and CheeZz—to form a separate group named Saigon Sweet Girls in October, releasing several cover videos. During this time, 52Hz happened to meet RIO when he visited her brother Doan Minh Vu's house, and the two eventually started dating. With Rio's companionship and support, 52Hz began developing her music career and honing her talents while they were both still students. Later on, he began teaching her how to compose music. Although he recognized 52Hz's potential, RIO had to put his own solo career on hold due to limited funds at the time to focus on supporting her, believing that "[...] it would be a waste if she didn't get to develop her abilities at that exact stage and moment." Taking on the role of both manager and record producer, he reached out to his connections to give her opportunities to grow and build a name for herself. She changed her stage name to 52Hz and began uploading her covers to SoundCloud in 2021.

Mối quan hệ này đã thay đổi tôi rất nhiều, chúng tôi yêu nhau từ thời mới lớn, cùng nhau trải qua những ngày ở trong căn phòng trọ nhỏ cho đến khi có được những thành công bước đầu (This relationship has changed me a lot, we love each other since the beginning, spent together days in the small motel room until the initial success) [...].

— 52Hz, Men's Folio Vietnam, 2 February 2025.

After graduating, 52Hz continued making music at night while working a day job to maintain her income and invest in her music projects. Her main job at the time was teaching at a language center. Having to do everything themselves posed a significant challenge for RIO and 52Hz. Additionally, to support their independent music releases, they taught themselves social media content creation and attended several workshops on SEO and marketing.

=== 2022–2023: Career beginnings and indie career ===
Pursuing the indie music path, 52Hz and Rio handled most of the production and promotion for their music themselves. During this time, Rio gave her his demo of "Tan," and they collaborated on producing the track with an additional version composed by 52Hz. In December 2022, 52Hz released "Tan" as an EP featuring different versions of the song; unexpectedly, "Tan" went viral and landed in Spotify's Top 50. Seeing the positive reception, 52Hz considered leaving her office job to focus on her art. Due to the pressure of juggling two jobs, she chose to quit, stating, "Overloaded, stressed, and reached the point where a choice had to be made." However, the financial burden then began to fall on shoulders of RIO.

In 2023, 52Hz continued to "enter" the music market with seven songs: "Cực hình" (Torment) in collaboration with rapper Coldzy, "Anh thì nah" (her debut solo single), "Tại gia" (At Home), "Đau lòng" (Heartbroken) with Machiot, "Do4love" with Willistic, along with two hits "now she don't" and "Đợi" (Waiting). Early that year, she had to take a break after losing her voice for four months due to a COVID-19 infection, which left her sounding raspier. This specific vocal quality made her recordings unique and captivating. 52Hz released the single "now she don't" featuring Wean on October 2, and the song immediately went viral on TikTok; she wrote this piece before "Tan" (Melt), drawing inspiration from a friend's romantic relationship. Shortly after, 52Hz released "Đợi" at the end of the year, a song inspired by the anime series Violet Evergarden. Upon its release, "Đợi" became a hit and 52Hz's most successful achievement to date, reaching number 1 on the Viral 50 chart and garnering 15 million streams on Spotify. Initially, the lyric video for "Đợi" reached about 10 million views on YouTube, but that number has since grown to over 20 million. Đời sống & Pháp luật (Life & Law) remarked, "[...] a captivating melody with a mysterious female voice, creating an inescapably romantic feeling." The song was later featured in the 2025 television series Tiệm ăn của quỷ (The Devil's Eatery).

=== 2024–present: EP Nhà and departure of being an indie singer ===
Following the success of "Đợi," 52Hz released a version of the song in January 2024, once again collaborating with Wean. Upon its release, it garnered nearly 6 million streams on Spotify. Subsequently, 52Hz released the solo single "Mê cung tình yêu," which continued to be a fan favorite thanks to strong streaming numbers, as the single went viral on TikTok in mid-2024. Đời sống & Pháp luật praised the production for its "smart, sophisticated handling of materials" and the "seamless blend of modern musical thinking with vintage elements" (specifically R&B, trap, and reggae). Additionally, other artists began collaborating with her more frequently on four tracks: "Time" by $A Milo and 16 Typh, "Nhạt-Fine" by Grey D, "Bà tôi" by Rich Choi, and "Đi cùng anh" by Bùi Trường Linh. She and RIO also co-wrote the song "Her" for Mỹ Mỹ. Later in April, 52Hz performed with the Cam Philharmonic Orchestra during two nights of the Cam Gala "i" by 8 the Theatre in Hanoi and Ho Chi Minh City, and DAO Entertainment officially announced her as one of their signed artists in early July. Afterward, she appeared at the 2024 Anh trai "say hi" awards night and performed the show's theme song, "The Stars," alongside Liz Kim Cương, Mỹ Mỹ, Juky San, and Pháo.

In an interview, 52Hz shared that she was working on a musical project about "things that cannot be said, even to family members." Officially, 52Hz's debut EP, Nhà (Home), was released on November 15, with production handled by Rio over the course of more than a year. The lead single "Ở nhà một mình" (Home Alone) was released just prior to the EP. Nhà consists of songs co-written by the duo, focusing on themes of "the journey of growing up and healing the soul," personal "private stories," and 52Hz's aspirations for her life journey ahead. Inspired by the romantic relationship between her and RIO, 52Hz co-wrote and featured on four tracks across various genres in RIO's debut solo EP, Tình (Love); his decision to return as a singer was made possible by the fact that they now had a full support crew. At the end of that year, 52Hz received a nomination for Rising Artist at the 2024 WeChoice Awards and was featured in the song "Miền đất kỳ diệu" (Wonderland) for the awards' theme album, as well as the theme song "Diều ngược gió (The Future is Now)" for the 2024 Làn Sóng Xanh Music Awards. She was honored to receive her first nomination for New Artist of the Year at the Dedication Music Awards in early 2025.

Transitioning from an indie singer, 52Hz gained wider recognition after participating in the 2025 TV show Em xinh "say hi". Showcasing her talent, she collaborated on four songs that all reached the "number one" spot on YouTube's trending tab across various genres: dance-pop and disco with "AAA"; the K-pop style "Run"; pop ballad and R&B with "Không đau nữa rồi"; R&B and hip hop with "Gã săn cá"; and the pop rock track "Quả chín quá." Additionally, songs like "Chẳng phải anh đâu," "Cứ đổ tại cơn mưa," "Ta di da," "Trời sao," and the show's theme song "The Real Aura" also went viral on social media thanks to her signature vocals. Although she only finished in the top 10, 52Hz took home awards such as "The Best Music Creative Artist" and "The Best Hit" for the song "Không đau nữa rồi." Following the show, 52Hz collaborated with Chau Bui on the song "Tone vào tim anh" for a Sunplay Vietnam campaign and was featured on Low G's debut album, L2K. Later, she appeared as a guest on Livestage 3 of the 2025 show Anh trai "say hi," collaborating on the track "Em đã chờ anh bao lâu." 52Hz and RIO were also named Best Dual Star of the Year at Men's Folio Vietnam magazine's 2025 M-Merging Faces awards.

== Artistry ==
=== Influence ===
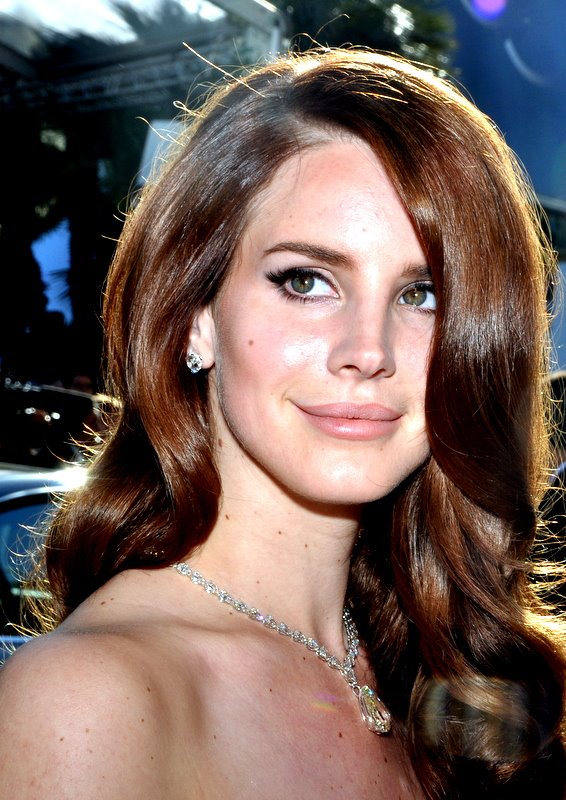
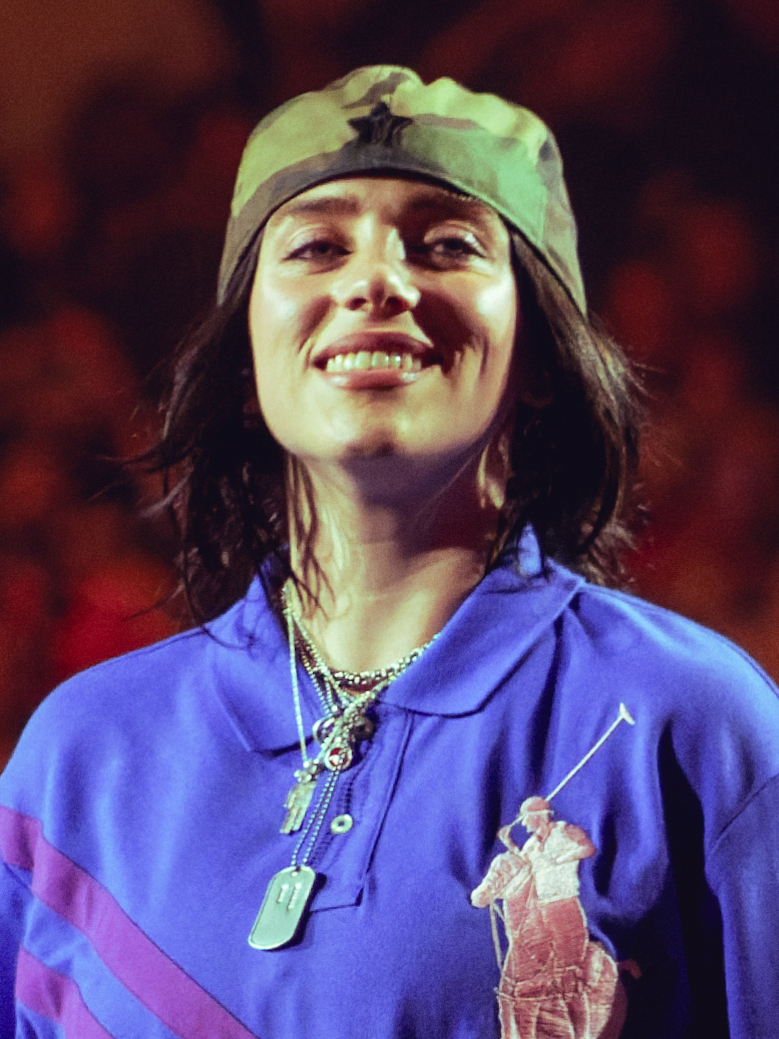
Lana Del Rey (left) and Billie Eilish (right) are the two artists who influenced 52Hz's singing style.

Rihanna has been 52Hz's role model since middle school; she admires Rihanna's fashion sense, vocals, personality, and career, and along with Shakira, both are her idols. Exo and BTS were the K-pop groups 52Hz followed until her first year of college. For a period of time, she also frequently listened to Tiên Tiên's music and the album Chill with Me (2018). However, her later singing style was influenced by Lana Del Rey and Billie Eilish, with the press even dubbing her the "Billie Eilish of Vietnam." In an interview, 52Hz shared that listening to Lana Del Rey and Daniel Caesar helped her develop her own unique vocal sound. Other artists who have influenced her include H.E.R. Additionally, she is a fan of Mỹ Anh's music.

RIO was the one who inspired 52Hz to pursue her passion for music; he was her first mentor, always encouraging her to compose and produce music, and he also served as the inspiration for the songs she wrote.

=== Musical style and songwriting ===
52Hz's compositions are inspired by the theme of love, private emotions, and stories about the people around her in life, which makes the songs she writes "[...] carry a melancholic tone as a way to transform" and she can draw ideas from anything in life. These tracks often have a narrative, "slow" storytelling quality and lean more toward emotion than technique. The lyrics she "[...] writes will not be too elaborate, mainly focusing on the feelings and experiences of the audience, helping them awaken many layers of emotion," being connective and empathetic. In music, she always wants to break her own limits and does not restrict herself to any single genre. She is also considered a phenomenon in the new generation of the Vietnamese R&B scene as she often sticks with R&B, along with pop, trap-soul, and pop rap.

52Hz is known for her emotive storytelling, unique vocal style, and distinct musical identity.

=== Reception ===
52Hz has been described as having a diverse musical style and a modern musical mindset. Her acclaimed skills include singing, melodic rap, songwriting, choreography, performing, and music production.

In the first season of the TV show Em xinh "say hi", 52Hz became one of the most talked-about standout faces due to her distinct personality, individual mark, and versatility. Her participation was compared to that of an "energetic warrior," and when chosen as a captain, 52Hz demonstrated her leadership skills through her ability to arrange group positions for performances.

52Hz and RIO are described as a perfect duo and partners in many projects; their collaboration has made waves in the Vietnamese music scene. Đời sống & Pháp luật describes their music as "[...] minimalist yet emotional arrangements, paired with a 'dreamy, haunting' vocal style." Rio himself has also praised 52Hz's voice and rare musical talent. An ninh Thủ đô reports that 52Hz's music possesses a charm that "[...] makes her a one-of-a-kind artist in the Vietnamese music market."

=== Fashion and imagery ===
52Hz pursues an edgy, feminine, and groundbreaking underground fashion style combined with Y3K, avant-garde, and futuristic aesthetics, as well as a bold and distinctive Kitsch vibe; it all carries a creative spirit that defies traditional East Asian beauty standards. She often incorporates accessories and uses a trapper hat as her signature look. She has also featured on the cover of May 2025 L'Officiel Vietnam magazine.

== Personal life ==
52Hz started dating the artist RIO (born on the same year as her) in 2019. The couple later moved in together and raised a dog. They officially got married in April 2025. RIO had also proposed to her earlier while they were doing their wedding photoshoot in Da Lat. 52Hz shared that she has a simple personality and acts on her emotions.

== Discography ==
=== EPs ===
- Nhà (2024)

=== Singles ===
==== As lead artist ====
Year	Title	Charts		Ref.
Year	Title	VN (Note: The "Billboard Vietnam" Hot 100 chart started in January 2022.)	VNTop Vie. (Note: The Billboard Vietnam Top Vietnamese Songs started in January 2022.)	Ref.
2022	"Tan" ft. RIO (prod. TATUDA)	—	—	
2022	"Cực hình" ft. Coldzy	—	—	
2023	"Anh thì nah" (prod. Minsicko)	—	—	
2023	"Do4love" ft. willistic (prod. Minsicko)	—	—	
2023	"now she don't" ft. Wean	—	—	
2023	"Đợi" (prod. RIO)	16	—	
2024	"Mê cung tình yêu" (prod. RIO)	—	—	
2024	"Ở nhà một mình" (prod. RIO)	—	—	
2025	"một cảm xúc rối bời không thấy lối thoát" (prod. RIO)	—	—	

==== From Anh trai "say hi" ====
Year	Title	Ref.
2024	"The Stars" (with Liz Kim Cương, Mỹ Mỹ, Juky San, Pháo)	
2025	"Em đã chờ anh bao lâu?" (with Bùi Duy Ngọc, Phúc Du, Otis, Ogenus, RIO)	

==== From Em xinh "say hi" ====
Year	Title	Ref.
2025	"The Real Aura" (with 30 Em xinh "say hi" contestants)	
2025	"AAA" (with Liên quân 2)	
2025	"Run" (with Châu Bùi, Yeolan, Lyhan, Ánh Sáng AZA)	
2025	"Không đau nữa rồi" (with Orange, Châu Bùi, Mỹ Mỹ ft. Pháp Kiều)	
2025	"Quả chín quá" (with Đào Tử A1J, Lâm Bảo Ngọc, Pháo Northside)	
2025	"Chẳng phải anh đâu" (with Châu Bùi, Vũ Thảo My, Phương Ly, Orange)	
2025	"Cứ đổ tại cơn mưa" (with Châu Bùi, Vũ Thảo My, Phương Ly, Orange)	
2025	"Trời sao"	
2025	"Tadida" (with Bích Phương, Lâm Bảo Ngọc, Bảo Anh)	
2025	"Việt Nam hơn từng ngày" (with 30 Em xinh "say hi" contestants)	

== Awards and nominations ==
Year	Award	Category	Nomination	Result	Ref.
2024	WeChoice Awards	Rising Artist	Bản thân	Nominated	
2025	Giải thưởng Cống hiến	Best New Artist	Bản thân	Nominated	
2025	Em xinh "say hi"	Most beautiful and most impressive music	Bản thân	Won	
2025	Em xinh "say hi"	Most watched and listened	"Không đau nữa rồi"	Won	
2025	M-Merging Faces Awards	Best Dual Star of the Year	52Hz & RIO	Won	
2025	WeYoung	Rising Artist	Bản thân	Nominated	
2025	WeChoice Awards	Song of the Year	"Không đau nữa rồi"	Nominated	
