= Daddi (disambiguation) =

Daddi is a town in India. Daddi may also refer to:

== People ==
- Bernardo Daddi (c. 1280–1348), Italian painter
- Cosimo Daddi (before 1575–1630), Italian painter
- Francesco Daddi (1864–1945), Italian tenor

== Other uses ==
- Katri Daddi, village in India

== See also ==
- Daddy (disambiguation)
