= Soobin Hoàng Sơn =

Vietnamese singer-songwriter (born 1992)

Soobin
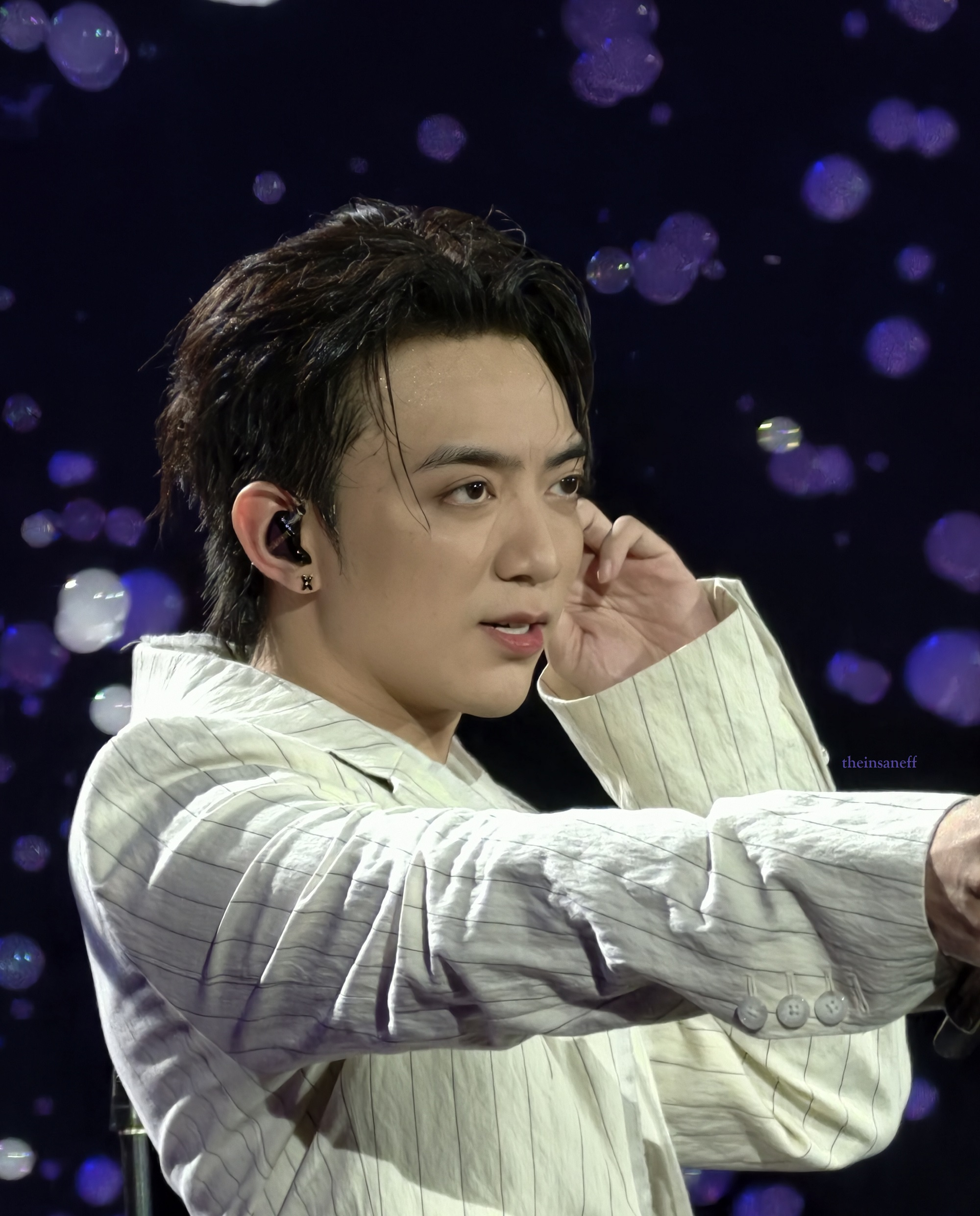
- Soobin in 2025
- Born: Nguyễn Huỳnh Sơn; September 10, 1992 (age 33); Hanoi, Vietnam
- Parent: Nguyễn Huỳnh Tú
- Musical career
- Origin: Hà Nội, Vietnam; Ho Chi Minh City, Vietnam
- Genres: V-pop; R&B; dance-pop; ballad; hip-hop; EDM
- Instruments: Vocals; piano; organ; đàn bầu
- Label: SpaceSpeakers

Nguyễn Huỳnh Sơn (born September 10, 1992), better known by the stage name Soobin or Soobin Hoàng Sơn (stylized as SOOBIN), is a Vietnamese singer-songwriter.

== Early life ==
Soobin was born on September 10, 1992. His father, Nguyen Huynh Tu, is a composer and instrumentalist. Soobin's grandfather was the cải lương Nguyen Huynh Tuan, and his grandmother is Meritorious Artist Le Thi Hao Yen, who was active in the cải lương troupe of Thanh Hoa province. From a young age, he studied monochord and piano under his father's guidance. He graduated with a major in jazz piano from the Vietnam National Academy of Music after seven years of professional piano study beginning at age 11.

== Career ==
=== 2014–2016: Career Beginnings and The Remix ===
In 2014, Soobin reached the runner-up position in the Vietnam-Korea music talent search contest called Ngoi Sao Viet (Viet Star). He was chosen for professional training in South Korea for six months, where he had the opportunity to interact with K-pop groups such as 4Minute, CNBLUE, F.T. Island, and Teen Top. After returning from Korea, Soobin became a member of the Hanoi-based underground group SpaceSpeakers, founded by Touliver, alongside JustaTee and Rhymastic.

In mid-2016, Soobin Hoang Son moved to Ho Chi Minh City to build his music career. By mid-July 2016, he released the songs "Lalala" and "Va the la het" (And That's the End), both of which he composed. "Lalala" is an R&B track produced with the help of Touliver. In 2016, Soobin won the Silver Prize at The Remix (season 2), which was followed by increased commercial recognition.

=== 2016–2020: Ballad releases and commercial success ===
In June 2016, Soobin released 'Phia sau mot co gai' (Behind a Girl), composed by Tien Cookie. According to streaming data, it was the second most-played song in Vietnam that year. By the end of 2021, the song's lyric video had garnered 237 million views on YouTube, earning him two major nominations at the 2017 Devotion Music Awards for New Artist of the Year and Music Video of the Year. On January 1, 2017, Soobin Hoang Son collaborated with 1989s Entertainment to release the music video "Di de tro ve" (Going to Return). The music video featured actress Phan Thanh Ha, a middle school friend of Soobin's. Following "Di de tro ve," he released the music video for a new track titled "Di va yeu" (Go and Love). One week later, he released another music video titled "Anh da quen voi co don" (I've Gotten Used to Loneliness). In mid-2017, the singer released several commercial music videos, such as "Vinh quang dang cho ta" (Glory Awaits Us) for Arena of Valor and "Nong xe mood" for Revive Chanh Muoi. He also collaborated with Suni Ha Linh on a song titled "Mot ngay rat khac" (A Very Different Day).

In July 2017, Soobin Hoang Son released "Xin dung lang im" (Please Don't Be Silent), composed by Duong Khac Linh. The track reached 2 million streams in less than a day. Following his appearance on The Remix, media outlets referred to Soobin as a 'ballad prince' due to the commercial performance of his sentimental tracks. Soobin did not deny that ballads were the path he was focusing on; he stated, "With the genuine emotions of 'Xin dung lang im,' Soobin hopes the song will touch the audience's feelings or find some form of empathy." Also in 2017, he was invited to be a coach for the fifth season of The Voice Kids Vietnam. His student Do Thi Hoai Ngoc won runner-up, while another student, Tran Quoc Thai, took third place.

On January 1, 2018, Soobin Hoang Son released the music video "Di de tro ve 2 – Chuyen di cua nam" (The Trip of the Year), composed by Tien Cookie. The single "I Know You Know"—a fast-paced funky pop song—was released on March 31, 2018. The recording was finalized with producers TINLE and SlimV. Soobin also performed the soundtrack for the movie "Yeu em bat chap" (Love You No Matter What) with a song of the same name, which premiered on April 6, 2018. Before the official audio by Soobin, the song "Yeu thuong ngay do" had been performed live by Hoai Lam during promotional events for the film. "Dep nhat la em" (You Are the Most Beautiful) was a collaboration between Soobin Hoang Son and Jiyeon, released on July 27 with both Korean and Vietnamese versions. The song was featured on seven Korean music sites, including Melon, Genie, Bugs, Mnet, Naver Music, Soribada, and Olleh. The track was composed by Korean producers Krazy Park and Eddy Park, with Vietnamese lyrics written by Soobin himself. Also in 2018, Soobin returned as a coach for The Voice Kids Vietnam alongside Vu Cat Tuong, leading students Dao Dinh Anh Tuan and Nguyen Tran Xuan Phuong to runner-up positions.

After his time as a coach, Soobin Hoang Son announced the project "Di de tro ve 3 – Se hua di cung nhau" (Promising to Go Together), reuniting with Tien Cookie and collaborating with the group Da LAB. The movie YOLO, in which he starred, premiered on January 11, 2019. The music video "Neu ngay ay" (If That Day) was released on April 13, 2019. Within nearly 24 hours, the video surpassed 3.3 million views, reaching No. 7 on Vietnam's YouTube Trending chart and becoming the second most-viewed music video in Asia. On September 4, 2019, Soobin released the official music video for "Say Goodbye" in collaboration with Touliver. On April 30, 2020, he released an R&B cover of "Van nho" (Still Remember).

=== 2020–2024: The Playah and the Shift to R&B ===
In November, the singer changed his stage name to Soobin and announced his most heavily invested project with SpaceSpeakers to date, the EP "The Playah." The EP achieved significant success on YouTube and digital music platforms. 2020 also marked a maturation in Soobin's image, showcasing a "remarkable" edge in both his music and lifestyle, presenting a completely different side of himself compared to previous years.

On May 14, 2021, Soobin released "The PLAYAH Special Performance," a mash-up of three songs from the EP. It was a performance stage blending disco-funk, jazz, and orchestral music. The song won the Top 10 Most Popular Songs of the Year award at the Làn Sóng Xanh (Green Wave) Awards and reached 40 million views on YouTube after eight months. In 2022, he contributed vocals to the SpaceSpeakers album titled "Kosmik."

=== 2024–present: Bat No Len and Continued Success ===
On May 26, 2024, Soobin released his first career studio album, titled Bat No Len (Turn It Up). The album includes 10 songs composed by him, featuring three title tracks: "Heyyy," "Gia nhu" (Only If), and "Ai ma biet duoc" (Who Knows) featuring Tlinh. During this period, he appeared in the reality television shows Sao nhap ngu (Stars Enlist) and Call Me by Fire Vietnam, where he was a member of the 'All-Powerful Family' group. He was the contestant with the highest overall score in Season 1 and won a double award for "X-Fire – All-Powerful Brother" and "Most Popular Brother."

On January 8, 2025, at the 30th Mai Vang (Golden Apricot) Awards, he won in two categories: Favorite Male Singer/Rapper and Favorite Music Video. On January 15, 2025, the album Bat No Len helped him win Album of the Year at the Làn Sóng Xanh Awards. On the morning of January 12, 2025, Soobin officially reached 4 million votes in the Inspirational Figure category, becoming the first Vietnamese artist to hit this milestone in the history of the WeChoice Awards 2024. In late February 2025, Soobin was announced as the "All-Powerful Producer" for the reality show "Tan binh toan nang" (All-Powerful Rookie), alongside Toc Tien and Kay Tran.

Soobin received three nominations at the 19th Devotion Music Awards. On March 5, 2025, he won in all three nominated categories: Album of the Year, Music Video of the Year, and Male Singer of the Year. This made Bat No Len the only physical album released in 2024 to win every album-related nomination category across the Làn Sóng Xanh, WeChoice, and Devotion Awards.

On March 14, 2025, Soobin released the music video for "Dancing in the Dark," a track from the album Bat No Len On November 10, he released the song "Muc ha vo nhan," a collaboration with Binz and People's Artist Nguyen Huynh Tu, his father.

== Discography ==
=== Studio albums ===
- Bật nó lên (2024)

=== Extended plays ===
- The Playah (2021)

=== Music videos ===
Year	Video	Release date	Songwriters	Artists
2012	Chờ em trong đêm	25 February, 2012	Soobin Hoàng Sơn	Soobin Hoàng Sơn
2012	Em không tồn tại	25 February, 2012	Soobin Hoàng Sơn	Soobin Hoàng Sơn
2014	Đi qua quá khứ	11 November, 2014	Soobin Hoàng Sơn	Soobin Hoàng Sơn
2016	Vui đi em	6 January, 2016	Soobin Hoàng Sơn	Mix166
2016	Lalala	14 July, 2016	Soobin Hoàng Sơn	Touliver
2016	Phía sau một cô gái	18 October, 2016	Tiên Cookie	1989s Production
2016	Và thế là hết (Lalala Version 2)	18 August 2016	Soobin Hoàng Sơn	Long Halo
2017	Đi để trở về	1 January, 2017	Tiên Cookie	Tiên Cookie
2017	Để dành	16 January, 2017	Soobin Hoàng Sơn	Touliver
2017	Đi và yêu	7 March, 2017	Phạm Toàn Thắng	Mix166
2017	Anh đã quen với cô đơn	14 March 2017	Soobin Hoàng Sơn	Tín Lê
2017	Ngại gì khác biệt	16 June 2017	Khắc Hưng	Khắc Hưng
2017	Xin đừng lặng im	31 July, 2017	Dương Khắc Linh; Shin Hồng Vịnh	Dương Khắc Linh
2017	Tọa độ tình yêu	22 December 2017	Rhymastic	DreamS Productions
2017	Chơi để hiểu chàng	13 February, 2017	Tiên Cookie; Tiến Thành; Trượng Kiên	Tiên Cookie
2018	Đi để trở về 2 – Chuyến đi của năm	1 January, 2018	Tiên Cookie	Tiên Cookie
2018	I Know You Know	31 March, 2018	Soobin Hoàng Sơn	Tín Lê
2018	Yêu thương ngày đó	6 June, 2018	Nguyễn Khoa	Long Halo
2018	Nợ cha	29 September, 2018	Avi Kim Anh	Dương Khắc Linh
2019	Đi để trở về 3 – Sẽ hứa đi cùng nhau	1 January, 2019	Tiên Cookie; Da LAB	Tiên Cookie
2019	Đã đến lúc	13 April, 2019	Soobin Hoàng Sơn	SlimV
2019	Nếu ngày ấy	16 July, 2019	Nguyễn Đức Tùng	Lê Thanh Tâm
2019	Say Goodbye	4 September, 2019	Nguyễn Hoàng	Touliver; Soobin Hoàng Sơn
2020	Trò chơi	21 November, 2020	SOOBIN	Touliver
2020	Blackjack (sample Melodia dla Zuzi)	30 November, 2020	Marek i Wacek; SOOBIN; Binz	Touliver
2020	Tháng năm	15 December, 2020	Nguyễn Tùng; SOOBIN	Touliver
2021	The Playah (Special Performance)	14 May, 2021	SOOBIN; Nguyễn Tùng; Binz; Marek i Wacek; SlimV	SlimV
2023	Sunset in the City	26 October, 2023	SOOBIN, CHARLES.	MASTAL; SlimV
2023	Heyyy	7 December, 2023	SOOBIN	2pillz
2024	Giá như	10 April, 2024	SOOBIN	SlimV
2024	Điều ta muốn	4 December, 2024	SOOBIN	Tín Lê
2024	Đi để trở về 9 – Em ơi, anh nhớ nhà	30 December, 2024	Tiên Cookie	Tiên Cookie
2025	Dancing in the Dark	14 March, 2025	SOOBIN	SlimV

=== Collaborative music video ===
Year	Video	Featured artist	Released	Songwriters	Composers
2012	Cần	Rhymastic	18 September, 2012	Rhymastic	Rhymastic
2012	Vụt Tan	JustaTee	10 July, 2012	Soobin Hoàng Sơn	Soobin Hoàng Sơn, JustaTee
2015	Daydreams	BigDaddy	7 March, 2015	Soobin Hoàng Sơn, BigDaddy, Touliver	
2016	Từng Ngày Em Mơ Về Anh	MLEE	26 July, 2016	Rhymastic	Rhymastic
2017	Vài Lần Đón Đưa (Cover)	Touliver	20 January, 2017	Trần Lê	Touliver
2017	Nóng Xệ Mood	BigDaddy, Hạnh Sino	27 April, 2017	BigDaddy, Soobin Hoàng Sơn	BigDaddy
2017	Một Ngày Rất Khác	Suni Hạ Linh	30 June, 2017	Huỳnh Hiền Năng	Startling Production
2017	LIVE YOUR LIFE	JustaTee, BigDaddy	15 July, 2017	JustaTee	Touliver, Rhymastic
2017	Vinh Quang Đang Chờ Ta	Touliver, Rhymastic	17 July, 2017	Rhymastic, Garena Liên Quân Mobile, Soobin	Touliver, Rhymastic
2017	Ngày Mai Em Đi	Touliver, Lê Hiếu	1 August, 2017	Thái Thịnh	Touliver
2018	Tay Sạch Trao Yêu Thương	Bé Gia Hân (The Voice Kids)	15 January, 2018	Dương Khắc Linh	Dương Khắc Linh
2018	EVERYDAY	SpaceSpeakers	8 May, 2018	Rhymastic, JustaTee	Touliver
2018	Đẹp nhất là em – 우리사이	JIYEON	21 July, 2018	Krazy Park, Eddy S Park, Soobin Hoàng Sơn	Krazy Park
2020	Vì Một Việt Nam	Rhymastic, Touliver	19 February, 2020	Rhymastic	Touliver
2020	"Blackjack" (sample Melodia dla Zuzi)	Binz	31 November, 2020	Marek i Wacek; SOOBIN; Binz	Touliver
2021	Freaky Squad	Binz, Rhymastic, Touliver	30 November, 2021	SOOBIN, Binz, Rhymastic, Touliver	Touliver
2024	Ai Mà Biết Được	tlinh	25 June, 2024	SOOBIN, tlinh	Touliver
2024	It's A New Dawn	CHARLES. & Kriss Ngo	2 August, 2024	CHARLES.	Kriss Ngo
2024	Hỏa Ca (Call Me By Fire)	33 anh tài của Anh Trai Vượt Ngàn Chông Gai	28 June, 2024	CHARLES.	SlimV
2024	Tiến Tới Ước Mơ	Rhymastic, SlimV	23 September, 2024	Rhymastic	SlimV
2025	Tiến Hay Lùi	Bùi Công Nam	23 January, 2025	Stilla D, Bùi Công Nam, SOOBIN	Bùi Công Nam
2025	Tiến Tới Ước Mơ 2	Rhymastic, SlimV	17 June, 2025	Rhymastic	SlimV
2025	Mục Hạ Vô Nhân	NSND Huỳnh Tú, Binz	10 November, 2025	Lấy cảm hứng từ bài Xẩm chợ Mục Hạ Vô Nhân	Soobin, SlimV

== Filmography ==
=== Music videos ===
Year	Title	As
2014	Đi qua quá khứ	Soobin Hoàng Sơn
2016	Vị khách bất ổn	Soobin Hoàng Sơn

=== Soundtracks ===
Year	Soundtrack	Film	Performed by
2017	Yêu thương ngày đó	Yêu em bất chấp	Soobin Hoàng Sơn

=== Feature film ===
Year	Film	Release date
2019	YOLO (Bạn chỉ sống một lần)	11/01/2019

== Awards and nominations ==
=== Achievements ===
- Runner-up, Ngôi sao Việt (2014)
- Runner-up, Hòa âm Ánh sáng season 2 (2016)
- Giải X-Fire – The All-Around Talent and the Most Popular Talent of Anh trai vượt ngàn chông gai mùa 1 (2024)
- "Outstanding Young Vietnamese Face of 2024" in the field of culture and arts
