= 2pillz =

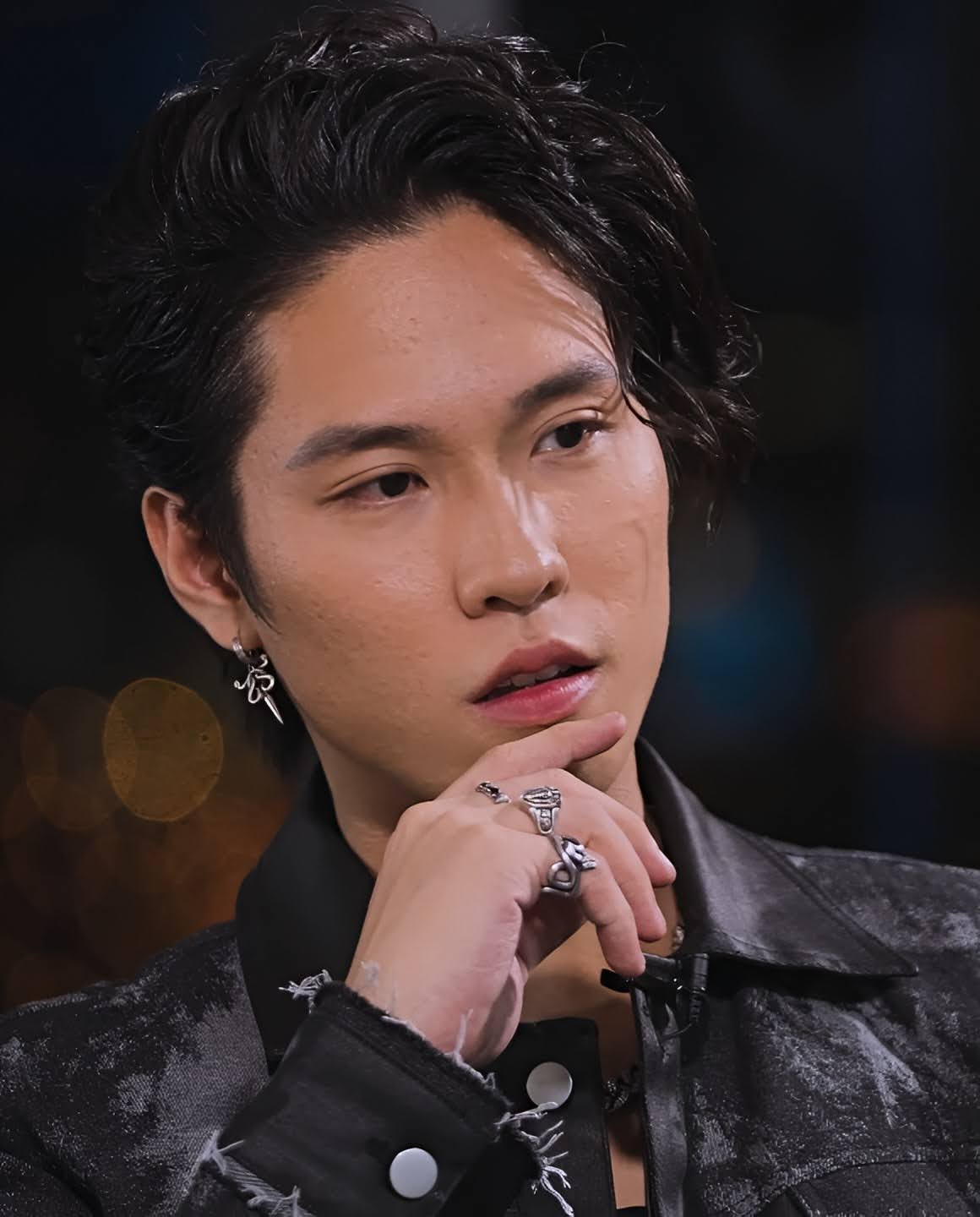
- 2pillz in 2023
- Born: Phạm Phú Nguyên
- Occupations: Nhạc sĩ; DJ; Nhà sản xuất thu âm; Nhạc công
- Years active: 2015–present
- Awards: Danh sách
- Musical career
- Origin: Thành phố Hồ Chí Minh, Việt Nam
- Genres: V-pop; hip hop; EDM; dance pop; house; R&B; trap; UK garage; folktronica; rock; afrobeat
- Instruments: Piano; keyboard điện tử; guitar; guitar điện; DJ mixer
- Label: S•Hube

Pham Phu Nguyen (born January 8, 1998), better known by his stage name 2pillz, is a Vietnamese songwriter, DJ, record producer, and musician. Originally active in the underground scene and having collaborated with many artists in that community, he rose to mainstream prominence through his work on successful projects by singer and rapper Tlinh in 2023, including the single "Neu luc do" and the album Ai.

Joining the S•Hube music production team, he has taken on a more prominent role as a music producer for major TV shows such as Rap Viet and Chị Đẹp Đạp Gió 2024. In 2025, 2pillz released his first solo album titled Pillzcasso.

== Life and career ==
2pillz was born on January 8, 1998, in Hanoi as Phạm Phú Nguyên. Although no one in his family pursued music, he was given the opportunity to be exposed to music from a fairly early age. He became active as an underground artist in 2015 and soon gained significant fame within the community.

In late 2019, while studying computer technology in the US, 2pillz suddenly returned home to pursue music production. Through introductions from friends, he had the chance to meet several figures in the hip-hop scene such as Tlinh, MCK, and Wxrdie, and began collaborating with them on musical projects. His first extended play (EP), titled Where Are My Pills?, was released in February 2020 in collaboration with rapper Prettyxix.

In 2023, 2pillz collaborated with Tlinh on two singles, "Ghệ iu dấu của em ơi" and "Nếu lúc đó." Among them, "Nếu lúc đó" received positive feedback from both critics and the public, peaking at number one on both the Billboard Vietnam Hot 100 and Top Vietnamese Songs charts. He also served as the primary producer for the debut studio album by female rapper Ái, released that same year; the album was ranked 15th by NME magazine on its list of the 25 best Asian albums of 2023.

In June of the same year, 2pillz officially joined S•Hube, a music production team founded and managed by St.319 Entertainment. Along with his colleagues, he served as a producer for the third season of the show Rap Viet that same year, working directly with coach Thai VG's team. The tracks he produced for the show received massive support from the audience, contributing to approximately 2.9 billion views out of the show's total 5 billion views on TikTok after just 10 episodes. On August 10, 2023, 2pillz released the new single "Tình wá akk" in collaboration with Grey D, paving the way for the mixset album The Sunset released 12 days later. The album includes eight tracks arranged in a nonstop style, using simple and repetitive lyrics to create different musical portraits of the sunset.

== Discography ==
=== Album ===
Year	Title	Type	Artists	Ref.
2023	Ái	Album	tlinh	
2023	The Sunset	Mixset album	2pillz	
2023	Minh tinh	Album	Văn Mai Hương	
2024	Bật nó lên	Album	Soobin	
2024	Khu vườn tình	Album	Tăng Duy Tân	
2024	Anh bờ vai	Album	Vương Bình	
2024	The Wrxdies	Album	Wrxdie	
2024	Nhân trần	Album	BigDaddy	
2025	Pillzcasso	Album	2pillz	
2025	Trap	Album	Rhyder	
2025	Giai nhân	Album	Văn Mai Hương	
2026	Đẫm tình	Album	Juky San	

=== Extended plays ===
Year	Title	Artists	Ref.
2020	Where Are My Pills?	Prettyxix, 2pillz	
2021	MayWeather	Prettyxix, 2pillz	
2022	Aspire	Hành Or	
2024	Dám đam mê dám rực rỡ	Nhiều nghệ sĩ	
2024	Mộngmee	Amee	
2024	Chia tay	Juky San	
2025	Kèo thơm	Hằng BingBoong	
2026	Anh bờ vai – Ấn bản Kim	Vương Bình	

=== Singles ===
Year	Title	Artists	Notes
2020	"Laviai (Remix)"	Wrxdie ft. Hieuthuhai	
2020	"Con gái cưng"	Prettyxix ft. 2pillz	
2020	"If You Said So"	Coldzy ft. Wrxdie, 2pillz	
2020	"Hot"	Wrxdie ft. 2pillz	
2021	"10k"	SMO, Prettyxix, 2pillz	
2021	"Benedict"	Sixtyuptown ft. 2pillz	
2021	"Drive"	Prettyxix ft. Coldzy	
2021	"Stay Up"	Prettyxix	
2021	"Gái độc thân"	tlinh	
2021	"Đìu anh luôn giữ kín trong tym"	MCK, tlinh, 2pillz	
2021	"Cuối tuần"	Wrxdie, KayC, 2pillz	
2021	"Diego"	Prettyxix, Liu Grace, 2pillz ft. SmokeLee	
2021	"Còn gì để mất"	2pillz, Wokeup, Wrxdie, tlinh	
2021	"Bạn thân ơi"	Wrxdie, Droppy, 2pillz	
2022	"Apeshit"	Prettyxix, V# ft. 2pillz	
2022	"Em iu"	Andree Right Hand ft. Wxrdie, Bình Gold, 2pillz	
2022	"Vẫn đợi"	Wrxdie	
2022	"Strip 'em Down"	tlinh	
2022	"Cần gì nói iu"	Wrxdie	
2023	"Lost In Your Eyes"	LostOwl, 2pillz, Prettyxix	
2023	"Ghệ iu dấu của em ơi"	tlinh	
2023	"Nếu lúc đó"	tlinh	
2023	"Love on Weekend"	V#, Prettyxix, 2pillz	
2023	"Gummy Bear"	V#, Prettyxix, 2pillz	
2023	"Good Morning"	Sixtyuptown, Coco Sonic, 2pillz	
2023	"Tình wá akk"	2pillz, Grey D	
2023	"Shawty ở trong Nam"	Prettyxix, 2pillz, VCC Left Hand	
2023	"Tình yêu có nghĩa là gì?"	tlinh	
2023	"Heyyy"	Soobin	
2023	"We Go Hard"	Thái VG, Andree Right Hand, Karik, Suboi, JustaTee, BigDaddy, B Ray	Trong Rap Việt 2023
2024	"Dám rực rỡ"	HIEUTHUHAI, Grey D, Obito, Wren Evans	Trong EP Dám đam mê dám rực rỡ
2024	"Đừng làm nó phức tạp"	tlinh	
2024	"Đi tìm tình yêu"	Mono	
2024	"Hop on Da Show"	tlinh, Low G	Trong EP FLVR
2024	"Mộng yu"	Amee	Trong EP Mộngmee
2024	"Waterfall"	Dyna V	
2024	"Nỗi đau đính kèm"	Anh Tú Atus ft. Rhyder	
2024	"Cho phép tôi mời anh một ly"	Vương Bình, Grey D	Trong album Anh bờ vai
2024	"Ngôi sao giữa thiên hà"	30 chị đẹp	Trong Chị đẹp đạp gió
2024	"Summer Night"	Xuân Nghi	Trong Chị đẹp đạp gió
2024	"Bao giờ em biết"	Thu Phương, Diệp Lâm Anh, Huyền Baby, Giang Hồng Ngọc	Trong Chị đẹp đạp gió
2025	"Tết "gòy" cưới "luông""	Phạm Quỳnh Anh, Minh Hằng, Tóc Tiên, Bùi Lan Hương, Dương Hoàng Yến, MisThy	Trong Chị đẹp đạp gió
2025	"Butterfly"	Dyna V	
2025	"Trao về anh"	Juky San	
2025	"Thác nìng"	2pillz, Mono, Grey D	Trong album Pillzcasso
2025	"Đến lúc này thì..."	2pillz, tlinh	Trong album Pillzcasso
2025	"Thương"	Bích Phương	
2025	"Vườn hồng"	Văn Mai Hương ft. Chi Pu, Hà Trần	Trong album Giai nhân
2026	"Ta cùng nhau quên niềm đau"	Juky San ft. Liu Grace	Trong album Đẫm tình
