= Papa (nickname) =

Papa is a nickname which may refer to:

- Cool Papa Bell (1903–1991), African-American Negro league baseball player, member of the Baseball Hall of Fame
- Papa Bue (1930–2011), Danish jazz trombonist and bandleader
- Papa Joe Chevalier (1948–2011), American sports radio personality
- Papa John Creach (1917–1994), American violinist
- Papa Dee (born 1966), Swedish raga musician
- Papa Bouba Diop (1978−2020), Senegalese footballer
- Louis Faury (1874–1947), French general
- Michele Greco (1924–2008), Sicilian Mafia member nicknamed "il Papa" ("the Pope")
- Paul Hausser (1880–1972), German World War II Waffen SS officer
- Papa Haydn (1732–1809), Austrian composer Joseph Haydn
- Ernest Hemingway (1899–1961), American author and journalist
- Walter Hörnlein (1893–1961), German World War II general
- Papa Jackson (born 1982), Filipino disc jockey
- Joseph Joffre (1852–1931), French World War I general
- Papa Jack Laine (1873–1966), American jazz drummer and bandleader
- Papa Charlie McCoy (1909–1950), African-American delta blues musician and songwriter
- Sokratis Papastathopoulos (born 1988), Greek footballer
- John Phillips (musician) (1935–2001), American singer-songwriter and guitarist
- Papa Don Schroeder (1940–2019), American music executive
- Scott Steiner (born 1962), American professional wrestler nicknamed "Big Poppa Pump"
- Friedrich Graf von Wrangel (1784–1877), Prussian Army field marshal

== See also ==
- Dad (nickname)
- Daddy (nickname)
- Pappy
- Pop (nickname)
- Poppa (disambiguation)
- Pops (nickname)
