= Daddy (disambiguation) =

Daddy is a familiar term of endearment, form of direct address, or nickname for father, and may also refer to:

== Film ==
- Daddy (1917 film), a British silent film directed by Thomas Bentley
- Daddies (film), a 1924 romantic comedy
- Daddy (1923 film), an American film starring Jackie Coogan and Josie Sedgwick
- Daddy (1987 film), a TV movie starring Danny Aiello and Dermot Mulroney
- Daddy (1989 film), an Indian Hindi-language film starring Anupam Kher
- Daddy (1991 film), a film based on the book of the same name by Danielle Steele
- Daddy (1992 film), an Indian Malayalam-language film
- Daddy (2001 film), an Indian Telugu-language film starring Chiranjeevi and Simran
- Daddy (2004 film), a Russian film
- Daddy (2015 film), an American film directed by Gerald McCullouch
- Daddy (2017 film), an Indian Hindi-language film starring Arjun Rampal, based on the life of gangster and politician Arun Gawli
- Daddy (2023 film), an American film directed by Neal Kelley and Jono Sherman

== Television ==
- Daddy (serial), a 2010–2011 Pakistani television drama serial that aired on ARY Digital
- Daddy (Keeping Up Appearances), a fictional character in the British comedy television series Keeping Up Appearances
- "Daddy" (Industry), a 2022 television episode

== Music ==
- Daddy, former name of the band Supertramp
- "Daddy" (Sammy Kaye song), a 1941 song
- "Daddy" (Korn song), a 1994 song
- "Daddy" (Beyoncé Knowles song), a 2003 song
- "Daddy" (Emeli Sandé song), the second single from Emeli Sande's debut album Our Version of Events
- "Daddy" (Psy song), a 2015 song
- "Daddy" (Coldplay song), a 2019 song
- "Daddy" (Tulisa song), a 2019 song
- "Daddy", a song from the album Alaga Ibile by Reminisce
- "Daddy", a song from the album In the Hot Seat by Emerson, Lake & Palmer
- "Daddy", a song from the album Pieces of You by Jewel
- "Daddy", a 1994 single from the Dutch pop group Pussycat
- "Puff Daddy", a former pseudonym for Sean "Diddy" Combs

== In print ==
- Daddy (novel), a 1989 novel by Danielle Steel
- Daddy (poem), a 1965 poem by Sylvia Plath

== People and fictional characters ==
- Daddy (nickname), a list of people and fictional characters
- Daddy Bazuaye (born 1988), Nigerian footballer
- Daddy Lumba (born 1964), Ghanaian musician
- Daddy Showkey (born 1970), Nigerian singer

== Other uses ==
- Daddy (dog) (1994–2010), an assistant dog-psychologist dog owned and used by Cesar Millan
- Daddy (slang), a slang term meaning an older man sexually involved in a relationship or having a sexual interest in a younger person

== See also ==
- Dady (born 1981), a Cape Verdean footballer
- Daddy G (born 1959), an English musician
- Daddy X, stage name of hip hop artist and record producer Brad Xavier
- Daddies, a brand of ketchup and brown sauce in the United Kingdom and Ireland
- Big Daddy (disambiguation)
- Daddi (disambiguation)
