= Lamoon =

Vietnamese singer-songwriter and actress (born 2003)

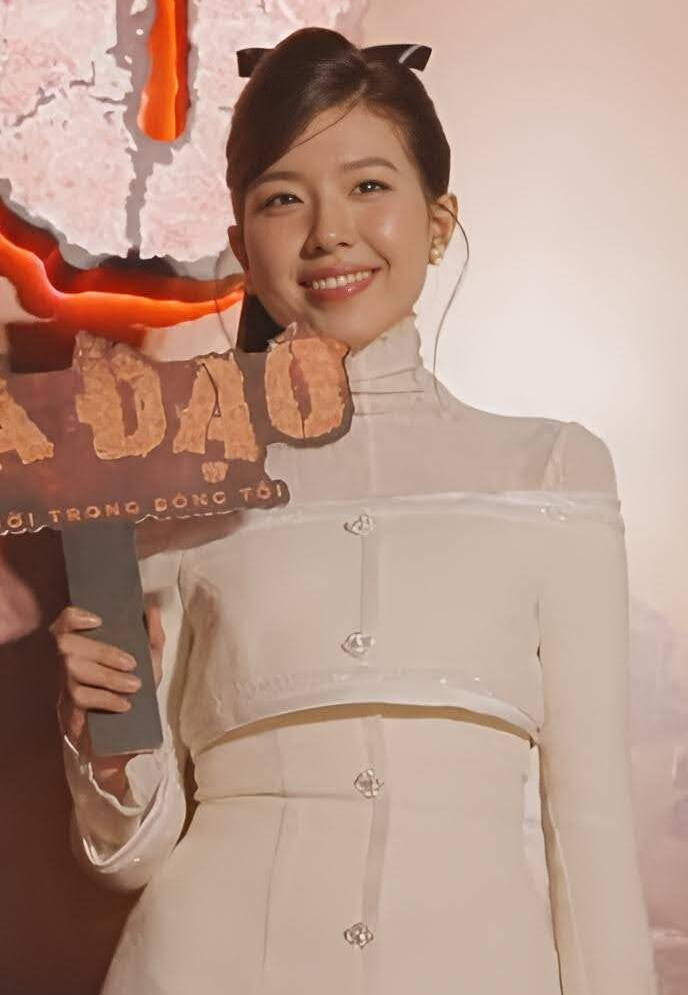
- Lamoon in 2025
- Born: Nguyễn Lê Diễm Hằng; August 18, 2003 (age 23)
- Occupations: Singer-songwriter; actress
- Years active: 2022–present
- Musical career
- Origin: Ho Chi Minh City, Vietnam
- Genres: V-pop; dance-pop; R&B; folktronica; ballad
- Instruments: Vocals
- Label: OG Entertainment

Nguyễn Lê Diễm Hằng (born August 18, 2003), also known by her stage name Lamoon (stylized in all caps as LAMOON), or Diễm Hằng Lamoon, is a Vietnamese singer-songwriter and actress. After gaining recognition as a contestant on Vietnam Idol in 2023, she rose to public prominence through her role as Út Khờ in the feature film Củ Chi Tunnels: Sun in the Dark (2025). In 2025, Lamoon participated in the first season of the TV show Em xinh "say hi" and made it into the top five lineup; alongside this, she released her debut studio album, Là Moon.

== Life and career ==
=== 2003–2023: Early life and career beginnings ===
Lamoon was born on August 18, 2003, as Nguyễn Lê Diễm Hằng. She is originally from Quang Nam province. During her school years, she attended the specialized Literature class at Nguyen Binh Khiem High School for the Gifted in Quang Nam. In 2022, she passed the entrance exam for the acting major at the Ho Chi Minh City University of Theatre and Cinema, ranking second in her class. She has performed as a singer at the Trung Vuong Theater in Da Nang.

In 2023, Lamoon auditioned for the eighth season of the TV show Vietnam Idol. She made an initial impression on the judges by appearing as Sailor Moon and performing her original song, "Nhỏ học chung trường lớn lên chung giường," during the audition round. Initially, the judges gave her a silver ticket for further consideration, and she eventually received a golden ticket to officially enter the theater round with 30 other contestants. After completing an additional idol music night with the top 15, Lamoon made it into the final group of 10 contestants competing in the live shows. She was eliminated during the sixth live show, finishing in the top 7 and failing to reach the grand finale.

Following the program, Lamoon released the song "Sao hiểu được" in collaboration with music producer Ly Anh Khoa on December 10. The entire music video (MV) for this track was filmed in a single take during her performance at the BridgeFest community music festival. In the video, the singer embraces an anime-inspired makeup style, bringing this aesthetic into the real world through five personas, starting with "Game Moon." She featured on the song "Hẹn em mai sau gặp lại" by Da Lab member Emcee L and contributed to composing some songs for the show Chị đẹp đạp gió rẽ sóng that same year, including writing the rap lyrics for "Mây và núi" and co-writing "Đầu đội trời chân đạp đất" with the production team DTAP. In an interview with Thanh Niên, the singer shared that she has taken a break from her studies at the University of Theater and Cinema to focus on developing her singing career.

=== 2024–: Địa đạo, Em xinh "say hi" and Là Moon ===
In 2024, Lamoon confirmed her participation in director Bui Thac Chuyen's feature film project Tunnel: Sun in the Dark, marking the first film role of her career. She played Ut Kho, a member of the guerrilla unit at the Binh An Dong base, known for her innocent, pure personality and her love for singing. Her selection for the role was a coincidence; the director had watched her perform on Vietnam Idol and was drawn to the singer's natural, bright demeanor, which shared similarities with the character. The film released in theaters in April 2025, setting a revenue record for a Vietnamese historical-war film by surpassing the 150 billion VND milestone. While playing a supporting role, she gained public recognition for her performance of a "tan co" (modernized classical opera) piece and for performing the film's theme song, "Sun in the Dark," alongside artist Cao Minh. She was also given a role in the movie Friend Zone (2025) and contributed vocals to the soundtrack song "Vietnamese Girl,". Alongside her acting career, the singer continued her collaboration with Ly Anh Khoa to release her next single, "Alone," on October 24, 2024. This was considered her official debut in professional music and served as the lead single for a 9-track album scheduled for release in 2025.

In May 2025, Lamoon was announced as one of the 30 female artists participating in the first season of the reality TV show Em xinh "say hi". After performing "Cầm kỳ thi họa" with teammates Bích Phương, Tiên Tiên, Bảo Anh, and Phương Mỹ Chi in the first performance round, the singer won over the audience with a segment where she performed her own lyrics with a clear voice over a pentatonic melody. This piece, which combined Northern Vietnamese folk influences with electronic music, helped all five members win the round with 114 votes from the studio audience. Throughout the subsequent rounds, her performances were considered not particularly standout, and she frequently found herself among the last group of contestants to move forward after each performance. Reaching the grand finale, the singer once again showcased her strength in folk music with the song "Dương gian" for her solo performance—a track written based on the theory of yin and yang, the elements that constitute the earthly realm according to Vietnamese beliefs—and "Morse Code" for the group performance alongside Orange, Phương Mỹ Chi, and Pháo. At the end of the show, Lamoon was named as part of the winning group "Best 5" alongside fellow members Bích Phương, Orange, Lyhan, and the winner, Phương Mỹ Chi.

After "Em xinh say hi," Lamoon introduced a new work titled "Synth chúc nâng ly" on August 27, featuring Juky San in the MV version. The song is arranged in a multi-structured pop style combined with EDM, bossa nova, and pentatonic influences, which Lamoon herself shared is the track with the most distinct folk colors in her debut album. To portray the mixed emotions regarding an ex-lover's happiness on their wedding day, she tweaked the lyrics by mixing English with Sino-Vietnamese words—something that sparked mixed debates among a segment of listeners regarding phrasing deemed illogical and a rhyming scheme that failed to deliver a strong auditory impact. The digital performance of "Synth chúc nâng ly" reached 435,000 views on YouTube nine days after its release.

On September 4, 2025, Lamoon announced the release of her debut album Là Moon, collaborating with music producers including JustaTee, BeeBB, CM1X, Lý Anh Khoa, Darrys, and LNK. The album consists of 12 tracks, all composed by her, and is built around the concept of a complete lunar cycle with eight distinct phases, symbolizing emotional stages in love. Outside of her solo projects, she also joined voices with Lâm Bảo Ngọc, Orange, and Muộii for the song "Hò vươn mình" from DTAP's studio album Made in Vietnam, and collaborated with Juky San to remake the singer's track "Người đầu tiên." Lamoon also appeared as a guest on the second season of the show Anh trai "say hi" that same year, performing the song "Sớm muộn thì" alongside the team of Nhâm Phương Nam, Hustlang Robber, Mason Nguyễn, Khoi Vu, and Jaysonlei—a performance that won "The Best Hit" award for the most-watched and most-listened-to work on the show.

== Public image ==
Lamoon's stage name was inspired by Sailor Moon, as she felt the character shared many similarities with her, especially the desire to spread positive energy and optimism. The name is also explained as a shortened version of the English phrase "Lady of the Moon," a reference to her real name, Diem Hang.

== Discography ==
=== Studio albums ===
- Là Moon (2025)

=== Singles ===
‡ The works are either primarily composed or co-composed by Lamoon.

==== As the lead artist ====
Năm	Title	Album	TK.
2022	"Tình tang đắm say"‡	Non-album singles	
2023	"Nhỏ học chung trường lớn lên chung giường"‡	Non-album singles	
2023	"Sao hiểu được"‡	Non-album singles	
2024	"Một mình"‡ (ft. Lý Anh Khoa)	Là Moon	
2025	"Synth chúc nâng ly"‡	Là Moon	
2025	"Trăng treo lửng lơ"‡ (ft. Ái Phương)	Non-album singles	

==== As featured artist ====
Year	Title	TK.
2023	"Hẹn em mai sau gặp lại" (Emcee L ft. Lamoon)	
2025	"Sớm muộn thì"‡ (Nhâm Phương Nam, Hustlang Robber, Mason Nguyễn, Khoi Vu, Jaysonlei ft. Lamoon)	
2025	"Người đầu tiên"‡ (Juky San ft. Lamoon)	

==== From Em xinh "say hi" ====
Year	Title	TK.
2025	"The Real Aura" (với 30 em xinh)	
2025	"Đã xinh lại còn thông minh" (với Liên quân 1)	
2025	"Cầm kỳ thi họa"‡ (với Bích Phương, Tiên Tiên, Bảo Anh, Phương Mỹ Chi)	
2025	"Red Flag"‡ (với Ngô Lan Hương, Yeolan, Han Sara ft. JSOL)	
2025	"I'll Be There"‡ (với Orange, Han Sara, Phương Mỹ Chi)	
2025	"Bắc thang lên hỏi ông trời"‡ (với Bích Phương, Mỹ Mỹ, Quỳnh Anh Shyn, Juky San)	
2025	"Cách (yêu đúng) điệu" (với Bích Phương, Mỹ Mỹ, Quỳnh Anh Shyn, Juky San)	
2025	"Dương gian"‡	
2025	"Morse Code"‡ (với Orange, Phương Mỹ Chi, Pháo Northside)	
2025	"Việt Nam hơn từng ngày" (với 30 em xinh)	
2025	"Best of Luck" (với Bích Phương, Orange, Lyhan, Phương Mỹ Chi)	

==== Bài hát thương mại ====
Year	Title	Brand	TK.
2024	"Nét riêng tỏa sáng" (ft. Vsoul)	Gervenne	
2025	"Đừng lo" (với Bích Phương, LyLy, Han Sara, Ánh Sáng AZA)	Liên Quân Mobile	

==== Film soundtracks ====
Year	Title	Film	TK.
2025	"Cô gái Việt Nam" (với Muộii, PiaLinh, Kiều Sax, Mỹ Mỹ, Vũ Thanh Vân)	Yêu nhầm bạn thân	
2025	"Mặt trời trong bóng tối" (với Cao Minh)	Địa đạo: Mặt trời trong bóng tối	

=== As composer ===
Year	Title	Artists	Note
2024	"Mây và núi"	Mỹ Linh, MLee, Hương Ly	Trong Chị đẹp đạp gió rẽ sóng
2024	"Đầu đội trời chân đạp đất"	Phương Vy, Diệp Lâm Anh, MLee	Trong Chị đẹp đạp gió rẽ sóng

== Filmography ==
=== Featured films ===
Year	Title	Director	Role	TK.
2025	Yêu nhầm bạn thân	Diệp Thế Vinh, Nguyễn Quang Dũng	Ca sĩ Mỹ Sơn	
2025	Địa đạo: Mặt trời trong bóng tối	Bùi Thạc Chuyên	Út Khờ	

=== TV shows ===
Year	Show	Role	Network	TK.
2023	<i id="mwAjA">Vietnam Idol</i>	Thí sinh	VTV3	
2024	Studio H9 – Hẹn cuối tuần	Khách mời	HTV7	
2025	Em xinh "say hi"	Thí sinh	HTV2	
2025	Thế giới Showbiz	Khách mời	HanoiTV	
2025	2 ngày 1 đêm	Khách mời	HTV7	
2025	Anh trai "say hi"	Khách mời hỗ trợ	HTV2	

== Awards and nominations ==
Year	Award	Category	Nomination	Result	TK.
2025	M-Merging Faces Awards	Nghệ sĩ trẻ xuất sắc nhất năm (Nữ)	Bản thân	Nominated	
2025	L'Officiel Beauty Choice Awards	Best Beauty Transformation (Female)	Bản thân	Nominated	
2025	TikTok Awards Việt Nam	Nghệ sĩ âm nhạc của năm	Bản thân	Won	
2025	WeYoung	Rising Artist	Bản thân	Nominated	
2025	Ngôi Sao Xanh	Gương mặt triển vọng (hạng mục Điện ảnh)	Bản thân	Won	
2025	Ngôi Sao Xanh	Video âm nhạc hay nhất	"Synth chúc nâng ly"	Nominated	
2025	Ngôi Sao Xanh	Video âm nhạc được yêu thích nhất	"Synth chúc nâng ly"	Nominated	
2025	Làn Sóng Xanh	Gương mặt mới xuất sắc	Bản thân	Nominated	
2025	Làn Sóng Xanh	Ca khúc nhạc phim được yêu thích	"Mặt trời trong bóng tối"	Nominated	
2025	Làn Sóng Xanh	Nữ ca sĩ/rapper được yêu thích nhất	Bản thân	Nominated	
2025	Producer Inside Picks & Awards	Nghệ sĩ mới của năm	Bản thân	Nominated	
2025	WeChoice Awards	Bài hát của năm	"Sớm muộn thì"	Nominated	
2025	WeChoice Awards	Rising Artist	Bản thân	Nominated	
