= Big Daddy =

Big Daddy may refer to:

== Arts and entertainment ==
=== Characters ===
- Big Daddy (BioShock), a heavily armored adversary in the BioShock video game series
- Big Daddy (Transformers), a character from Transformers
- A character in the Tennessee Williams 1955 play Cat on a Hot Tin Roof
- A comic character in the comic Buster, based on Shirley Crabtree (see below)
- A character in the syndicated comic strip Raising Duncan by Chris Browne
- A character in The Simpsons, episode "The Simpsons Spin-Off Showcase"
- A character Dad in The Fairly OddParents
- A zombified main character from the movie Land of the Dead
- The name of the former leader of Millennium in Gungrave
- The father of Blanche Devereaux on The Golden Girls
  - "Big Daddy" (Golden Girls episode), a related episode of the series
- Vincent Price's cameo role in the 1963 movie Beach Party
- A character from the comic book series Kick-Ass, and its film adaptation
- A character in the Disney movie The Princess and the Frog
- A character in the 2012 film Django Unchained
- Big Daddy was the main villain in the 1998 video game Rogue Trip: Vacation 2012

=== Films ===
- Big Daddy (1969 film), a horror film
- Big Daddy (1999 film), a comedy film starring Adam Sandler

=== Music ===
- Big Daddy (John Mellencamp album), 1989
- Big Daddy (Bukka White album), 1974
- Big Daddy (band), a novelty band who covered 80's & 90's songs in 50's & 60's style
- "Big Daddy" (Heavy D song), 1997
- "(I Hate You) Big Daddy", a song from Walk Hard: The Dewey Cox Story
- Big Daddy (Notorious B1 song), 1993

=== Other media ===
- Big Daddy?, an anti-evolution religious tract by Jack Chick
- Big Daddy 103.9, a former on-air brand of a Greater Sudbury, Ontario, Canada radio station CHNO-FM

== People ==
=== Arts and entertainment ===
- Richard "Big Daddy Ritch" Anderson, lead vocalist for American red dirt metal ensemble Texas Hippie Coalition
- Glenn Hughes (English singer) (born 1951), British bassist and singer
- Ron Jeremy (born 1953), American pornographic actor
- Big Daddy Kane (born 1968), American rapper
- Big Daddy Kinsey (1927–2001), American Chicago blues singer and musician
- Eric "Big Daddy" Nord (1919–1989), American Beat Generation-era nightclub owner, poet, actor, and hipster
- Ed Roth (1932–2001), American artist, cartoonist, illustrator, pinstriper and custom car designer and builder

=== Politics ===
- Idi Amin (1928–2003), President of Uganda from 1971 to 1979
- Robert Byrd (1917–2010), American senator (self-given epithet in 2006)
- Fred Gardiner (1895–1961), Canadian politician and namesake of the Gardiner Expressway
- Jesse Unruh (1922–1987), American Speaker of the California State Assembly

=== Sport ===
==== Baseball ====
- Matt Cain (born 1984), American professional baseball player
- Cecil Fielder (born 1963), American former baseball player
- Vladimir Guerrero (born 1975), American professional baseball player
- Matt Holliday (born 1980), American professional baseball player
- Rick Reuschel (born 1949), American former baseball player

==== Combat sports ====
- Riddick Bowe (born 1967), American boxer
- Shirley Crabtree (1930–1997), British professional wrestler
- Viscera (wrestler) (Nelson Frazier Jr., 1971–2014), American professional wrestler
- Gary Goodridge (born 1966), Canadian kickboxer and mixed martial artist
- Walter (wrestler) (Walter Hahn; born 1987), Austrian professional wrestler
- Oliver Humperdink (John Jay Sutton; 1949–2011), American professional wrestling manager
- Junkyard Dog (Sylvester Ritter; 1952–1998), American professional wrestler

==== Other sports ====
- Zach Banner (born 1993), American football offensive tackle for the Pittsburgh Steelers of the NFL
- Don Garlits (born 1932), American drag racer
- Carl Hairston (born 1952), American professional football player
- Eugene Lipscomb (1931–1963), American football defensive lineman (1953–62)
- Shaquille O'Neal (born 1972), American basketball player
- Eric Rupe (born 1963), American BMX racing rider
- Dan Wilkinson (born 1973), American professional football player
- Johan Sundstein (born 1993), better known as BigDaddy N0tail, or just n0tail, Danish Dota 2 player

== Other uses ==
- Big Daddy (dune), a very large sand dune at Sossusvlei in the Namib Desert, Namibia

== See also ==
- Big Dada, British independent record label imprint
- Big Poppa (disambiguation)
- Daddy (nickname)
- Daddy (disambiguation)
