= Pappy =

Pappy is another name for father.

Pappy is a nickname of:

== People ==
- Pappy Boyington (1912–1988), American Flying Tiger and fighter ace in World War II
- Fred Coe (1914–1979), American television producer and director
- Pappy Daily (1902–1987), American country music record producer and entrepreneur
- Vermont Garrison (1915–1994), United States Air Force colonel and flying ace in both World War II and the Korean War
- Paul Gunn (1899–1957), American World War II naval aviator
- John C. Herbst (1909–1946), American flying ace in World War II
- Duane S. Larson (1916–2005), American World War II fighter pilot
- Howard Mason (born 1959), American drug trafficker
- Frank Noel (1905–1966), American photojournalist
- W. Lee O'Daniel (1890–1969), Texas governor and senator
- Bert Papworth (1890s–1980), British trade unionist
- Willie Revillame (born 1961), Filipino television personality and businessman, formerly nicknamed Pappy
- Paul Rowe (Canadian football) (1917–1990), professional football player
- Pappy Waldorf (1902–1981), American football player and coach
- Grover Washabaugh (c. 1893–1973), American college and high school football and basketball coach
- Pappy Wood (1888–1978), Canadian curler
- Young Pappy (born c. 1995 - 2015) was an American rapper

== Fictional characters ==
- Poopdeck Pappy, father of the comic strip character Popeye
- Pappy Yokum, father of Li'l Abner
- Pappy Van Poodle, friend of Rusty from Rusty's Real Deal Baseball

== See also ==
- Pappy's, a British three-man comedy act
- Pappy's Smokehouse, a barbecue restaurant in St. Louis
- Dad (nickname)
- Daddy (nickname)
- Papa (nickname)
- Pop (nickname)
- Pops (nickname)
