= Pops (nickname) =

Pops is a nickname for:

- Louis Armstrong (1901–1971), American jazz musician
- Henry Beasley (1876–1949), British Army lieutenant colonel and early contract bridge player
- Clarence Coleman (baseball) (1884-?), African-American baseball catcher in the pre-Negro leagues
- Pops Fernandez (born 1966), Filipino singer
- Pops Foster (1892–1969), American jazz musician
- Berry Gordy, Sr. (1888–1978), American businessman
- Stan Heal (1920–2010), Australian footballer and politician
- Emmett Johns (1928-2018), Canadian priest and humanitarian
- Fred T. Long (1896–1966), American Negro league baseball player and college football coach
- Lonnie Lynn (1943–2014), American basketball player
- Pops Mensah-Bonsu (born 1983), British basketball player
- Pops Mohamed (born 1949), South African jazz musician
- Pops Staples (1914–2000), American gospel and R&B musician
- Willie Stargell (1940–2001), American Major League Baseball player
- Pops Yoshimura (1922–1995), Japanese motorcycle tuner and race team owner

== See also ==
- Pop (nickname)
- Dad (nickname)
- Daddy (nickname)
- Papa (nickname)
- Pappy
