= Panth Maharaj =

Indian Hindu yogi (1855–1905)

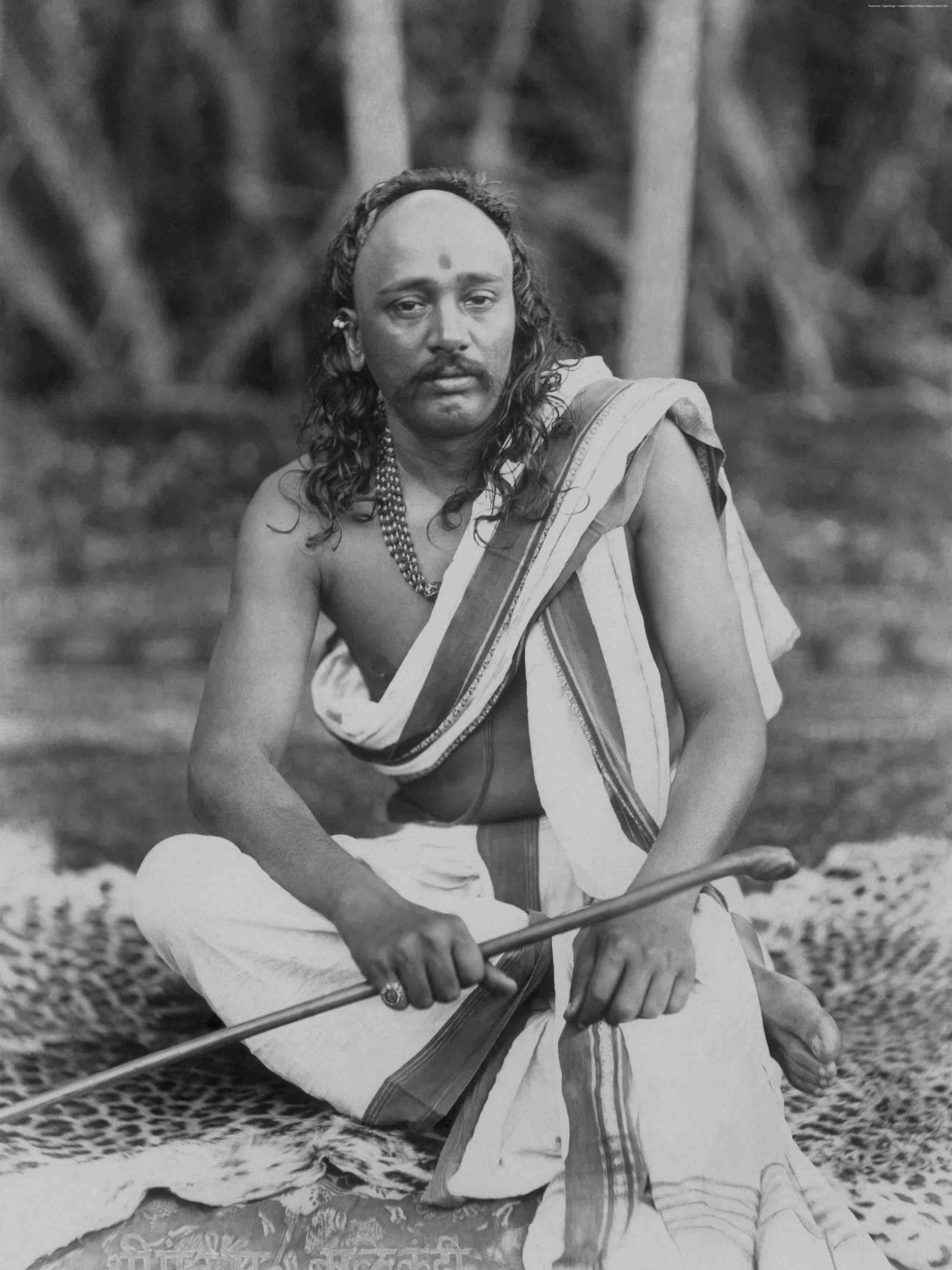
- Photograph of Shri Pant Maharaj

Personal life
- Born: 3 September 1855 Daddi, British India
- Died: 16 October 1905
- Spouse: Yamunakka
- Notable work(s): Datta Prem Lahari, Balbodhamrutsaar, Atmajyoti, Bhaktalaap, Paramanubhavaprakash, Sfut Lekh, Bodhanandgutika, Anubhavalli, Bramhopadesh, Prembhet, Bhagvadgeetasaar, Bhaktodgaar, Premtarang

Religious life
- Religion: Hinduism
- Philosophy: Avadhut Navnath

Religious career
- Teacher: Balmukund
- Born: Dattatreya Ramchandra Kulkarni

Quotation

"Look inwards, Oh Man.

For the Self which is one with the Guru, Shedding the distinction between the rich and the poor, Burn down the ashes of castes and lineages.

What is Knowledge? What is Meditation? And what is Pure Experience?

When you have become one with Balmukund, There is neither happiness nor sorrow." – from the Datta Prem Lahari pada 87

Pant Maharaj (3 September 1855 – 16 October 1905), born Dattatreya Ramchandra Kulkarni, was a Hindu yogi and guru in the Belagavi region of India and is regarded by his devotees as a saint and an incarnation of Dattatreya.

== Biography ==
Pant Maharaj was born in a Deshastha Brahmin family to Ramachandra Pant and Sitabai (née Godakka) on the 3 September 1855 in Daddi on the auspicious day of Krishna Janmashtami. He spent much of his infancy and early years in his father's ancestral village of Balekundri and after his upanayana at the age of eight, moved to his mother's ancestral village of Daddi for primary school, living with his maternal uncle.

Pant Maharaj's life was marked by poverty and struggles to provide for his family members. He lived through the Great Famine of 1876–1878 and was employed as a teacher for 23 years at the London Mission School in Belgavi.

He is considered to be great Hindu saint who founded a philosophy in which the nine gurus of the Avadhut sampradaya are attributed to Dattatreya. He is considered by some devotees to be an incarnation of Dattatreya.

On 27 October 1892, Pant Maharaj met with his contemporary, Swami Vivekananda, during the latter's 13 day visit to Belgavi, where they conversed for several hours.

== Legacy ==
The main ashram and temple dedicated to Pant Maharaj is located in the village of Balekundri on the outskirts of Belgavi. The village was informally renamed as Pant Balekundri in his honor.

The temple houses the wooden shoes, or padukas, worn by him. Behind the temple is an Indian fig tree marking the spot where he was cremated and an eternal flame that has been kept burning from his funeral pyre.

Annually thousands devotees of Pant Maharaj from Karnataka, Maharashtra and Goa participate in a three-day event commemorating his death anniversary in the month of October. On the first day, devotees carry out a procession holding a holy flag, traversing approximately 15 kilometers from the city of Belgavi to the temple in Balekundri. On the second day, a palanquin symbolically carrying Pant Maharaj is paraded in a procession from Pant Maharaj's ancestral home to the temple. On the third day, prasāda is distributed to all devotees who consume it together irrespective of caste, social standing, or wealth in accordance with Pant Maharaj's teachings.

== Literary works ==
Datta Prem Lahari, meaning waves of love from Pant Maharaj, is considered to be his most seminal work. The book consists of 2,730 verses in Marathi and 27 verses in Kannada that were spontaneously composed by Pant Maharaj. The topics of these poems generally relate to praise of his guru Balmukund, expoundation of his guru's teachings, philosophy of the Avadhut sampradaya, self-realization, the omnipresence of God, advice on day-to-day living and overcoming challenges, the importance of chanting God's name, devotion to Dattatreya, yogic experiences, and the maya of the universe. The book was published posthumously in 1971.

Written by Pant Maharaj as a guide for two other disciples, the essay Premtarang, meaning wave of love, discusses existential questions about our life, God, and reincarnation, while the parallel essay, Bodhanand Gutika describes the eight limbs of yoga.

A few years after Balmukund departed for Srisailam for his mahasamadhi in 1877, Pant Maharaj authored a long essay entitled Bhaktalap. The essay narrates how he received blessings from Balmukund, how he gained the satsang of the saint Kallappa, and how he overcame challenges and grew his following of disciples.

In 1885 and 1886, Pant Maharaj wrote a series of essays narrating his experiences of self-realization. In the essay Atmajyoti, Pant Maharaj describes the euphoria experienced when he attained self-realization under the guidance of Balmukund. He compares his experience to that of Arjuna in the Mahabharata and Uddhava in the Bhagavatam seeing the Vishvarupa of God. In the second essay Anubhavvalli, Pant Maharaj narrates his anubhavas or experiences in a self-realized state in a question-and-answer form. In the third essay entitled Bramhopadesh, Pant Maharaj explains the concepts of Brahman and Atman in accordance with the Vedas and Upanishads.

In 1901, Pant Maharaj authored a story referred to as Prembhet or Bhaktodgar where a devotee approaches Balmukund with the desire to attain moksha through self-realization. Balmukund then proceeds to worship, bless, and enlighten the disciple, ultimately becoming spiritually one with him.

In Balbodhamrutsar, Pant Maharaj authored an entire guidebook based on Balmukund's simple advice that devotees should be of few words and behave as self-realized persons in society.

== Bibliography ==
- Kher, Indira (1994), Avadhuta Yogi Pant Maharaj of Balekundari, Bharatiya Vidya Bhavan
- Ramakrishnan, S. (2004). "10". Glimpses of the Great. Bharatiya Vidya Bhavan. ISBN 81-7276-333-6.
