= Dad (nickname) =

Dad is a nickname which may refer to:

- Dad Clark (1873–1956), American Major League Baseball player
- Dad Clarke (1865–1911), American Major League Baseball pitcher
- Dad Clarkson (1866–1911), American Major League Baseball pitcher
- Dad Hale (1880–1946), American Major League Baseball pitcher
- Dad Lytle (1862–1950), American Major League Baseball player
- William H. "Dad" Martin, photographer and successful postcard manufacturer in the early 1900s
- Dad Meek (1867–1922), American Major League Baseball catcher
- Harry Vail (died 1928), American collegiate rowing coach
- Dad Wheatley (1882–1961), Australian middle-distance runner

== See also ==
- Daddy (nickname)
- Papa (nickname)
- Pappy
- Pop (nickname)
- Pops (nickname)
