= Bích Phương =

Vietnamese singer (born 1989)

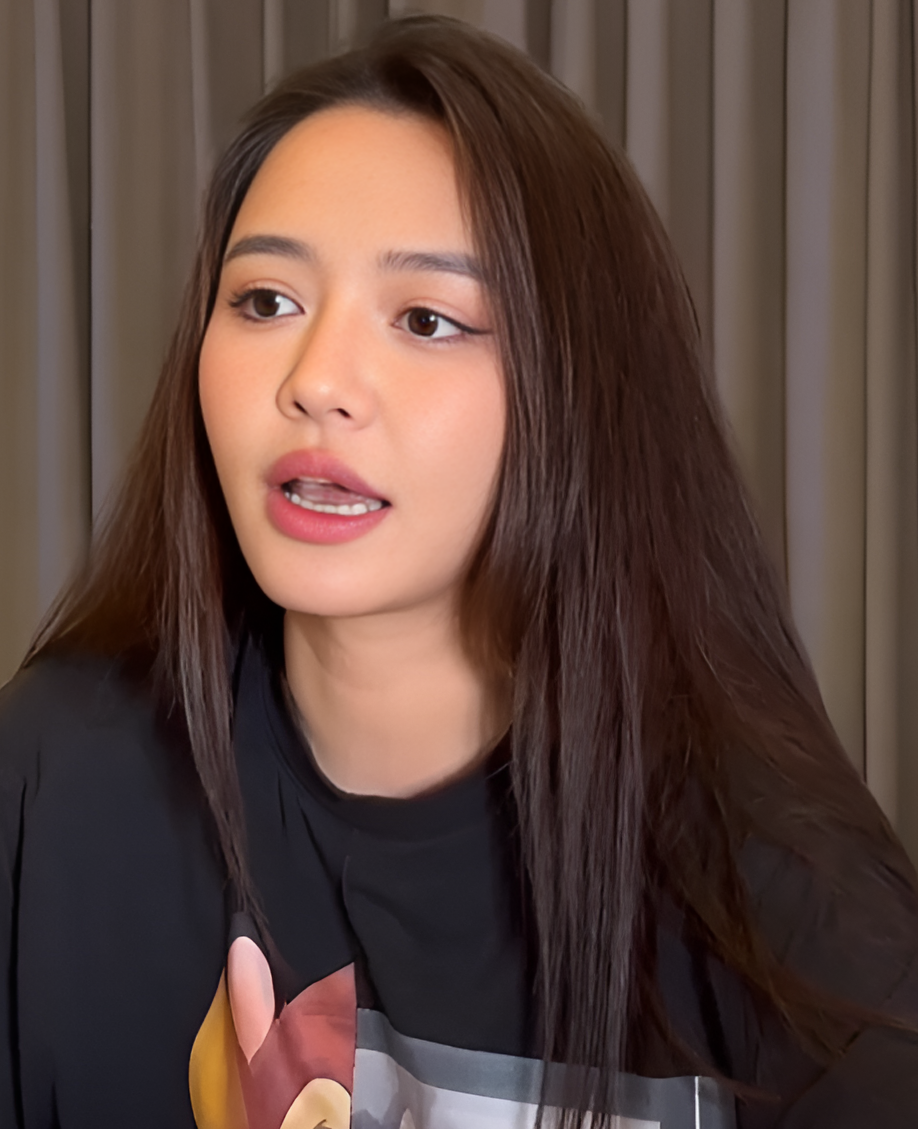
- Bích Phương in 2023
- Born: Bùi Thị Bích Phương; 30 September 1989 (age 36); Hạ Long, Quảng Ninh, Vietnam
- Occupations: Singer; songwriter
- Years active: 2009–
- Partner: 1989s Entertainment
- Musical career
- Genres: V-pop

Bùi Thị Bích Phương (born 30 September 1989) is a Vietnamese singer. She entered the entertainment industry as a contestant of Season 3 of Vietnam Idol in 2010.

== Career ==
=== 2008-2010: Vietnam Idol ===
As a participant of the second season of Vietnam Idol, she was cut at the top 40. She returned for the third season, having more success and being cut at the top 7 after performing "From Sarah with Love".

=== 2011–13: "Chỉ là em giấu đi" ===
In 2011, Phương debuted with the song "Có khi nào rời xa" (translation, there will be times we'll be far apart), written by Tien Cookie.

In 2013, she released her first full album Chỉ là em giấu đi, which included hit songs "Em sẽ quên", Vẫn, "Có khi nào rời xa", "Có lẽ em", and "Em muốn". The album was recognized as the album with the most weeks on top of the charts at the 2013 Zing Music Awards. The song "Em muốn" received top prizes at the YAN Vpop 20 Awards 2013, with Phương also named "Top 20 Singers" shortlist and "Breakout Female Singer of the Year".

=== 2014–17: genre changes with "Mình yêu nhau đi", "Gửi anh xa nhớ" and "Bao giờ lấy chồng" ===
In 2014, Phương began departing from the sad songs she was known for and recorded up-tempo pop music. Starting "Mình yêu nhau đi" composed by Tiên Cookie. In that year, she received three awards out of seven nominations at the 2014 Zing Music Awards, the most for any artist that year.

In 2016, the song "Gửi anh xa nhớ" garnered awards for Phương during the 2016 Zing Music Awards and WeChoice Awards 2016. She would follow up in 2017 with "Bao giờ lấy chồng", a song about the difficulties of being interrogated for being single on trips home for Tết. Later that year, she would join fellow Vietnam Idol Season 3 alum Văn Mai Hương as a judge Vietnam Idol Kids 2017. In July of that year, she would release her second full album Nói thương nhau thì đừng làm trái tim em đau.

=== 2018–19: mainstream recognition, Dramatic, "Bùa yêu" and "Đi đu đưa đi" ===
In 2018, Phương began a foray into the indie pop with the songs "Bùa yêu". In October of that year, she released the album Dramatic with the single "Drama Queen". On 11 November, she began promoting "Chị ngả em nâng" from the album Dramatic. At the end of the year, she worked with Tết Nguyên Đán and Mirinda to release "Chuyện cũ bỏ qua", with the associated music video receiving over 100 million streams.

During the Làn Sóng Xanh 2018 ceremony, Phương and her song "Bùa yêu" received seven award nominations. "Bùa yêu" would bring Phương two awards out of four nominations during Keeng Young Awards 2018, Music Video of the year at the Giải thưởng Âm nhạc Cống hiến 2019, and pushed her YouTube account to be the first to reach a million subscribers among Vietnam's female soloists.

=== 2025: Say Hi with Queens (Em xinh "say hi") ===
In 2025, Phương joined TV show Say Hi with Queens (Em xinh "say hi").

== Discography ==
=== Albums ===
Title	Details
Chỉ Là Em Giấu Đi	Released: 11 January 2012; Label: 1989s Entertainment; Formats: Streaming
Có Khi Nào Rời Xa (Chỉ Là Em Giấu Đi re-issued)	Released: 1 January 2015; Label: Viettel Telecom Corporation; Formats: Streaming, digital download
Dramatic	Released: 18 November 2018; Label: 1989s Entertainment; Formats: Streaming, digital download, CD

=== Extended plays ===
Title	Details
Điều Chưa Từng Nói	Released: 26 November 2014; Label: 1989s Entertainment; Formats: Streaming, digital download
REMOB	Released: 3 December 2015; Label: 1989s Entertainment; Formats: Streaming
Bao Giờ Lấy Chồng? (Original title: Xuân Đinh Dậu)	Released: 16 January 2017; Label: 1989s Entertainment; Formats: Streaming, digital download
tâm trạng tan hơi chậm một chút	Released: 17 May 2020; Label: 1989s Entertainment; Formats: Streaming, digital download
nhạc liu riu	Released: 24 November 2021; Label: 1989s Entertainment; Formats: Streaming, digital download

=== Singles ===
==== As lead artist ====
Title	Year	Peak chart positions		Album	Ref
Title	Year	VN Hot 100	VN Top Vietnamese	Album	Ref
"Em Sẽ Quên"	2011	—N/a	—N/a	Có Khi Nào Rời Xa	
"Vẫn"	2011	—N/a	—N/a	Chỉ Là Em Giấu Đi	
"Kí Ức Ngủ Quên"	2011	—N/a	—N/a	Có Khi Nào Rời Xa	
"Có Khi Nào Rời Xa"	2011	—N/a	—N/a	Chỉ Là Em Giấu Đi	
"Có Lẽ Em"	2012	—N/a	—N/a	Chỉ Là Em Giấu Đi	
"Em Muốn"	2013	—N/a	—N/a	Chỉ Là Em Giấu Đi	
"Mình Yêu Nhau Đi"	2014	—N/a	—N/a	Có Khi Nào Rời Xa	
"Nụ Hồng Mong Manh"	2014	—N/a	—N/a	Điều Chưa Từng Nói	
"Sâu Trong Em"	2015	—N/a	—N/a	REMOB	
"Rằng Em Mãi Ở Bên"	2015	—N/a	—N/a	REMOB	
"Gửi Anh Xa Nhớ"	2016	—N/a	—N/a	Non-album single	
"Bao Giờ Lấy Chồng?"	2017	—N/a	—N/a	Bao Giờ Lấy Chồng?	
"Nói Thương Nhau Thì Đừng Làm Trái Tim Em Đau"	2017	—N/a	—N/a	Dramatic	
"Bùa Yêu"	2018	—N/a	—N/a	Dramatic	
"Drama Queen"	2018	—N/a	—N/a	Dramatic	
"Chị Ngả Em Nâng"	2018	—N/a	—N/a	Dramatic	
"Đi Đu Đưa Đi (Let's Du Dua)"	2019	—N/a	—N/a	Non-album single	
"em bỏ hút thuốc chưa?" (with traitimtrongvang)	2020	—N/a	—N/a	tâm trạng tan hơi chậm một chút	
"Một Cú Lừa"	2020	—N/a	—N/a	tâm trạng tan hơi chậm một chút	
"từ chối nhẹ nhàng thôi" (with Phúc Du)	2020	90	63	tâm trạng tan hơi chậm một chút	
"Đố Anh Đoán Được"	2021	—N/a	—N/a	Trạm Cảm Xúc	
"nằm ngủ emru"	2021	—N/a	—N/a	nhạc liu riu	
"chiếc hộp"	2021	—N/a	—N/a	nhạc liu riu	

==== Promotional singles ====
Title	Year	Peak chart positions		Album	Ref
Title	Year	VN Hot 100	VN Top Vietnamese	Album	Ref
"Giúp Em Trả Lời Những Câu Hỏi"	2014	—N/a	—N/a	Điều Chưa Từng Nói	
"Đêm Em Chờ"	2014	—N/a	—N/a	Điều Chưa Từng Nói	
"Phai Dấu Cuộc Tình"	2014	—N/a	—N/a	Điều Chưa Từng Nói	
"Nơi Nào Có Anh"	2015	—N/a	—N/a	Non-album promotional single	
"Vâng Anh Đi Đi"	2015	—N/a	—N/a	Non-album promotional single	
"Tết Nhẹ Nhàng"	2016	—N/a	—N/a	Non-album promotional single	
"Cuộc Đời Là Những Bước Chân" (with Hà Anh Tuấn)	2017	—N/a	—N/a	Non-album promotional single	
"Kiếm Hiệp Tình"	2017	—N/a	—N/a	Võ Lâm Truyền Kỳ OST	
"Đưa Em Đi Khắp Thế Gian"	2017	—N/a	—N/a	Non-album promotional single	
"Cớ Sao Giờ Lại Chia Xa"	2017	—N/a	—N/a	Blade & Soul Việt Nam OST	
"Em Còn Khóc Làm Gì"	2017	—N/a	—N/a	Non-album promotional single	
"Ly Cà Phê Sữa Thính"	2018	—N/a	—N/a	Non-album promotional single	
"Ngay Ở Đây, Ngay Lúc Này"	2018	—N/a	—N/a	Dramatic	
"Tết Này Em Không Có Gì Để Mặc"	2018	—N/a	—N/a	Non-album promotional single	
"Chuyện Cũ Bỏ Qua"	2018	—N/a	—N/a	Non-album promotional single	
"Bao Giờ Hết Bận"	2018	—N/a	—N/a	Non-album promotional single	
"Em Chào Tết"	2020	79	54	Non-album promotional single	
"Tuổi Gì Mà Chẳng Thích Lì Xì" (feat. Bình Gold)	2020	—N/a	—N/a	Non-album promotional single	
"Khui Hè Hết Nấc" (with BigDaddy)	2020	—N/a	—N/a	Non-album promotional single	
"Thích Thì Chơi!" (with Phúc Du & ViruSs)	2020	—N/a	—N/a	Non-album promotional single	
"Kén Cá Chọn Anh"	2020	—N/a	—N/a	Non-album promotional single	
"Diệu Kỳ Việt Nam" (with Phúc Du, HieuThuHai & GDucky)	2021	—N/a	—N/a	Diệu Kỳ Việt Nam	
"vâng anh đi đi (liu riu version)"	2021	—N/a	—N/a	nhạc liu riu	
"em bỏ hút thuốc chưa? (liu riu version)"	2021	—N/a	—N/a	nhạc liu riu	
"drama queen (liu riu version)"	2021	—N/a	—N/a	nhạc liu riu	
"từ chối nhẹ nhàng thôi (liu riu version)" (with Phúc Du)	2021	—N/a	—N/a	nhạc liu riu	
"Tết Nô Lo (Ăn Bánh Uống Trà)"	2021	—N/a	—N/a	Non-album promotional single	
"Gánh Anh Đến Giây Cuối Cùng"	2022	—	—	Non-album promotional single	

=== Other charted songs ===
Title	Year	Peak chart positions		Album
Title	Year	VN Hot 100	VN Top Vietnamese	Album
"Đoản Xuân Ca"	2017	—N/a	75	Bao Giờ Lấy Chồng?
"Ngày Xuân Long Phụng Sum Vầy"	2017	—N/a	73	Bao Giờ Lấy Chồng?
"Mùa Xuân Ơi"	2017	—N/a	69	Bao Giờ Lấy Chồng?

== Awards and nominations ==
=== Asia Artist Awards ===
Year	Category	Nominated work/Recipient	Result	Note
2019	Best Vietnamese Artist	Herself	Won	

=== Devotion Music Awards ===
Devotion Music Awards, is an annual music award presented by Sports and Culture, a prestigious entertainment newspaper in Vietnam, to recognize the discoveries and creations contributed to the richness and development of Viet Nam pop music. The award is considered as a "Grammy Award" in Vietnamese music.

Year	Category	Nominated work/Recipient	Result	Note
2017	Best Music Video of the Year	Gửi Anh Xa Nhớ	Nominated	
2017	Best Song of the Year	Gửi Anh Xa Nhớ	Nominated	
2018	Best Music Video of the Year	Nói Thương Nhau Thì Đừng Làm Trái Tim Em Đau	Nominated	
2018	Best Song of the Year	Nói Thương Nhau Thì Đừng Làm Trái Tim Em Đau	Nominated	
2019	Best Music Video of the Year	Bùa Yêu	Won	
2019	Best Singer of the Year	Herself	Nominated	
2019	Best Album of the Year	Dramatic	Nominated	

=== Gala Vietnam Top Hits ===
Year	Category	Nominated work/Recipient	Result	Note
2015	Top Hits of the Year	Rằng Em Mãi Ở Bên	Won	
2015	Top Hits of the Year	Vâng Anh Đi Đi	Won	

=== Green Wave Music Awards ===
Green Wave Music Awards is one of the oldest and most prestigious annual music awards in the Vietnamese music industry. It was started in 1997 with the governing body being the 99.9 MHz FM radio station of the Voice of the People of Ho Chi Minh City.

Year	Category	Nominated work/Recipient	Result	Note
2012	Breakthrough Female Artist	Herself	Nominated	
2013	Breakthrough Female Artist	Herself	Nominated	
2014	Breakthrough Female Artist	Herself	Nominated	
2014	Single of the Year	Mình Yêu Nhau Đi	Nominated	
2018	Song of the Year	Bùa Yêu	Won	
2018	Music Video of the Year	Bùa Yêu	Won	
2018	Top 10 Songs of the Year	Bùa Yêu	Recipient	
2018	Viral Song of the Year	Bùa Yêu	Nominated	
2018	Best Collaboration	Bùa Yêu (shared with producer Dương K, Tiên Cookie & Phạm Thanh Hà)	Won	
2018	Top 10 Artists of the Year	Herself	Recipient	
2018	Female Artist of the Year	Herself	Won	
2019	Female Artist of the Year	Herself	Nominated	
2019	Song of the Year	Đi Đu Đưa Đi	Nominated	
2019	Top 10 Songs of the Year	Đi Đu Đưa Đi	Recipient	
2020	Top 10 Songs of the Year	em bỏ hút thuốc chưa?	Recipient	
2020	Music Video of the Year	em bỏ hút thuốc chưa?	Nominated	
2020	Song of the Year	em bỏ hút thuốc chưa?	Nominated	
2020	Best Collaboration	em bỏ hút thuốc chưa? (shared with producer Dương K & composer Tiên Cookie)	Nominated	
2020	Fan Favorite Female Artist of the Year	Herself	Recipient	
2020	Female Artist of the Year	Herself	Nominated	
2021	Female Artist of the Year	Herself	Nominated	

=== Metub WebTVAsia Awards ===
Year	Category	Nominated work/Recipient	Result	Note
2019	Best Dance Music Video of the Year	Đi Đu Đưa Đi	Won	

=== Vlive Awards ===
Year	Category	Nominated work/Recipient	Result	Note
2018	Artist of the Year	Herself	Won	
2019	Artist of the Year	Herself	Nominated	
2019	V Fanship Community	Herself & Shine (fandom)	Nominated	

=== YanVpop20 Awards ===
Year	Category	Nominated work/Recipient	Result	Note
2013	Breakthrough Female Artist of the Year	Herself	Won	
2013	Top 20 Music Videos of the Year	Em Muốn	Won	
2014	Song of the Year	Mình Yêu Nhau Đi	Nominated	
2015	Female Artist of the Year	Herself	Nominated	
2016	Music Video of the Year	Gửi Anh Xa Nhớ	Nominated	
2016	Top 20 Songs of the Year	Gửi Anh Xa Nhớ	Won	

=== Zing Music Awards ===
Year	Category	Nominated work/Recipient	Result	Note
2013	Album of the Year	Chỉ Là Em Giấu Đi	Nominated	
2013	Album with Most Weeks at #1 on Zing	Chỉ Là Em Giấu Đi	Won	
2014	Album of the Year	Điều Chưa Từng Nói	Nominated	
2014	Album with Most Weeks at #1 on Zing	Điều Chưa Từng Nói	Nominated	
2014	Music Video of the Year	Mình Yêu Nhau Đi	Nominated	
2014	Music Video with Most Weeks at #1 on Zing	Mình Yêu Nhau Đi	Won	
2014	Song of the Year	Mình Yêu Nhau Đi	Nominated	
2014	Pop/Rock Song of the Year	Mình Yêu Nhau Đi	Won	
2014	Most Shared Song of the Year	Mình Yêu Nhau Đi	Won	
2014	Song with Most Weeks at #1 on Zing	Mình Yêu Nhau Đi	Nominated	
2015	Song of the Year	Vâng Anh Đi Đi	Nominated	
2015	Song of the Year	Sâu Trong Em	Nominated	
2015	Album of the Year	Sâu Trong Em	Nominated	
2015	Music Video of the Year	Sâu Trong Em	Nominated	
2015	Music Video of the Year	Rằng Em Mãi Ở Bên	Nominated	
2015	Female Artist of the Year	Herself	Nominated	
2016	Song of the Year	Gửi Anh Xa Nhớ	Won	
2016	Music Video of the Year	Gửi Anh Xa Nhớ	Nominated	
2017	Music Video of the Year	Nói Thương Nhau Thì Đừng Làm Trái Tim Em Đau	Nominated	
2017	Song of the Year	Nói Thương Nhau Thì Đừng Làm Trái Tim Em Đau	Nominated	
2017	Pop/Ballad Song of the Year	Nói Thương Nhau Thì Đừng Làm Trái Tim Em Đau	Nominated	
2017	Artist of the Year	Herself	Nominated	
2017	Female Artist of the Year	Herself	Nominated	
