= Pop (nickname) =

Pop is a nickname of:

== Arts and entertainment ==
- Tihomir Pop Asanović (born 1948), Croatian jazz-rock and fusion keyboardist, Hammond organ player and composer
- Pop Hart (1868–1933), American painter and watercolorist
- Pop Laval (1882–1966), American photographer
- Pop Levi (born 1977), English singer, musician, record producer and filmmaker
- Pop Momand (1887–1987), American cartoonist

== Sports ==
- Pop Corkhill (1858–1921), American baseball player
- Frank Dillon (1873–1931), American baseball player
- Pop Foster (1878–1944), American baseball player
- Pop Gates (1917–1999), American basketball player and coach
- Pop Golden (1868–1949), American football and baseball coach
- Pop Goodwin (1920–2005), American basketball player
- Pop Ivy (1916–2003), American football player and coach
- Pop Joy (1860–1937), American baseball player
- Fred T. Long (1896–1966), American Negro league baseball player and college football coach
- Ed Lytle (1862–1950), American baseball player and manager
- Pop McKale (1887–1967), American football and baseball player, coach of football, basketball, baseball, and track, and college athletics administrator
- Gregg Popovich (born 1949), American basketball coach
- Pop Robson (born 1945), English footballer
- Pop Schriver (1865–1932), American baseball catcher
- Pop Smith (1856–1927), Canadian baseball player
- Pop Snyder (1854–1924), American baseball player, manager and umpire
- Pop Swett (1870–1934), American baseball player
- Pop Tate (baseball) (1860–1932), American baseball catcher
- Pop Warner (1871–1954), American football player and coach
- Pop Williams (1874–1959), American baseball pitcher
- Pop Williams (1906–1979), American football player

== Other ==
- Pop Hollinger (1886–1977), American comic book collector
- Pop Chalee (1906–1993), American painter, muralist, performer and singer born Merina Lujan

== See also ==
- Pops (nickname)
- Dad (nickname)
- Daddy (nickname)
- Papa (nickname)
- Pappy
