= Big Poppa (disambiguation) =

"Big Poppa" is a 1994 song by American rapper The Notorious B.I.G.

Big Poppa may also refer to:

- Nickname for The Notorious B.I.G. (1972–1997)
- Big Poppa E, American performer of slam poetry
- Big Poppa Pump, 1998–1999 ring name of professional wrestler Scott Steiner (born Scott Rechsteiner 1962)

== See also ==
- Big Papi, nickname of Dominican-American baseball player David Ortiz (born 1975)
- Big Daddy (disambiguation)
