= Francesco Daddi =

Italian opera tenor (1864–1945)

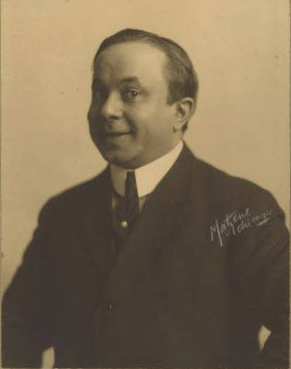
- ca. 1914–1919

Background information
- Born: 1864; Naples, Italy
- Died: October 22, 1945 (aged 80–81) Chicago
- Years active: 1891–1920

Francesco Daddi (Naples, 1864 – Chicago, 22 October 1945) was an Italian tenor. At the end of his career he also played bass roles.

== Biography ==
Funiculì funiculà, 1906

He began studying singing and piano, later dedicating himself to a career as an opera singer. He made his debut at the Teatro dal Verme in Milan in 1891 and the following year he created the role of Beppe in Ruggero Leoncavallo's opera Pagliacci in the same theater where he had made his debut. In 1900, he moved to London to sing at the Royal Opera House in Covent Garden, where he performed an entire opera season.

His career was centered on supporting roles, which led him to sing in the United States. In 1907, he performed at the Manhattan Opera House. He sang tenor roles of supporting characters for several years, performing with famous singers such as Enrico Caruso, Marcella Sembrich, Louise Homer, Marcel Journet, and Antonio Scotti. He then moved to Chicago where he played comic bass roles until 1920, when he retired from the opera stage. Daddi was a singing and opera teacher in Chicago in 1926.

He made numerous phonograph recordings for Columbia Records, especially from 1900 to 1910.
