= Poppa =

Poppa may refer to:

- Poppa, fictional character in Starlight Express
- Poppa of Bayeux, the Christian wife or mistress of the Viking conqueror Rollo
- Lil Poppa (2000–2026), American rapper, singer, and songwriter
