= Daddi =

Daddi Daddi-Ramewadi
- Town
- Location in Karnataka, India Daddi (India)
- Coordinates: 16°3′53.128″N 74°26′19.028″E
- Country: India
- State: Karnataka
- District: Belgaum
- Town: Daddi - Ramewadi

Population (2021)
  - Total: 21,004

Languages
  - Official: Kannada
- Time zone: UTC+5:30 (IST)
- Postal code: 591254

Daddi or Daddi-Ramewadi is a Town in Belagavi district in southern state of Karnataka, India. This place commonly known as the birthplace of Shri Pant Balekundri Maharaj.Daddi located on the holistic confluence of Ghatprabha and Tamrparni Rivers. DADDI also famous for its market held on Monday weekly.

This place commonly known as the birthplace of Shri Pant Balekundri Maharaj.Daddi located on the holistic confluence of Ghatprabha and Tamrparni Rivers.

Daddi is known for the annual jatra that takes place in February.

Daddi located 26 km from district headquarter Belgaum.

== Notable people ==
- Panth Maharaj, Hindu yogi was born in Daddi in 1855.
