= Tiên Cookie =

Vietnamese singer-songwriter

- Born: Nguyễn Thủy Tiên; 26 February 1994 (age 32); Hanoi, Vietnam
- Genre: Pop
- Occupations: Singer-songwriter; record producer; businesswoman
- Instruments: Vocals
- Years active: 2011–
- Label: 1989s Entertainment
- Website: 1989s.vn

Nguyễn Thủy Tiên (born 26 February 1994), known professionally as Tiên Cookie, is a Vietnamese singer-songwriter, music producer, and businesswoman. She founded her own record label, 1989s Entertainment, in 2016.

== Life and career ==
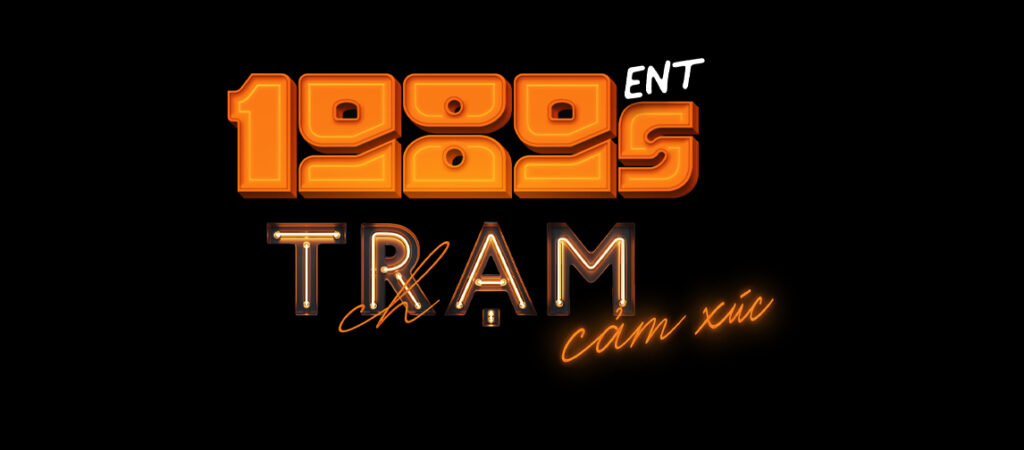
New logo of 1989s Entertainment and Logo of Album Trạm cảm xúc

Nguyen was born on 26 February 1994 in Hanoi, Vietnam. Her music aspiration came after recording a song in a studio for a friend during middle school. After taking some music theory and guitar lessons, she wrote her first song "Waiting on Valentine" at the age of 14. Nguyen left Hanoi for Saigon to develop her music career at the age of 18. She was noted by the media for having created several popular songs including "If We Ever Say Goodbye" (2011), "Talking To A Stranger" (2015), and "Behind A Girl" (2016). In 2016, Nguyen founded her own record label, 1989s Entertainment. She performed some of her own songs during the earlier stage of her career, and transitioned towards being a full-time music producer after her company establishment. In 2018, her song "Love Charm", which was sung by Bích Phương, swept several awards at the Green Wave Awards including Song Of The Year and Excellent Songwriting Team. In 2019, Nguyen was honored Music Producer Of The Year at the Dedication Music Award.

== Songs written ==
* Song titles are roughly translated into English for readability purposes. Actual Vietnamese song titles are indicated in parentheses.

Song	Artist(s)	Writer(s)	Album	Year	Ref.
"After All" (Sau Tất Cả)	Tiên Cookie	Tiên Cookie	Sau Tất Cả - Single	2013	
"Behind A Girl" (Phía Sau Một Cô Gái)	Soobin Hoàng Sơn	Tiên Cookie		2016	
"Bet You Can Guess It" (Đố Anh Đoán Được)	Bích Phương	Tiên Cookie, Phạm Thanh Hà, Phúc Du	Trạm Cảm Xúc	2021	
"Breakup In Peace" (Chia Cách Bình Yên)	Quốc Thiên	Tiên Cookie	Khi Anh Lặng Im	2013	
"Come Back Home 1" (Đi Để Trở Về 1)	Soobin Hoàng Sơn	Tiên Cookie		2017	
"Come Back Home 2" (Đi Để Trở Về 2)	Soobin Hoàng Sơn	Tiên Cookie		2018	
"Come Back Home 3" (Đi Để Trở Về 3)	Soobin Hoàng Sơn	Tiên Cookie, DaLab		2019	
"Come Back Home 5" (Đi Để Trở Về 5)	Hương Tràm	Tiên Cookie		2020	
"Cradling You To Sleep" (Nằm Ngủ Emru)	Bích Phương	Tiên Cookie, Phạm Thanh Hà	Trạm Cảm Xúc	2021	
"Deception" (Một Cú Lừa)	Bích Phương	Tiên Cookie	tâm trạng tan hơi chậm một chút	2020	
"Don't Wake Me Up" (Đừng Gọi Anh Dậy)	Phúc Du	Tiên Cookie, Phạm Thanh Hà, Phúc Du	Trạm Cảm Xúc	2021	
"Drama Queen"	Bích Phương	Tiên Cookie, Phạm Thanh Hà	Dramatic	2018	
"Enjoy Summer To The Fullest" (Khui Hè Hết Nấc)	Bích Phương, BigDaddy	Tiên Cookie, Phạm Thanh Hà		2020	
"Forgetting You A Bit" (Một Chút Quên Anh Thôi)	Bảo Thy	Tiên Cookie	My Emotions	2012	
"Gently Declined" (Từ Chối Nhẹ Nhàng Thôi)	Bích Phương, Phúc Du	Tiên Cookie, Phúc Du, Phạm Thanh Hà	tâm trạng tan hơi chậm một chút	2020	
"Getting Acquainted" (Câu Chuyện Làm Quen)	Quốc Thiên	Tiên Cookie		2017	
"Have You Quit Smoking" (Anh Bỏ Hút Thuốc Chưa)	Tiên Cookie (1st version); Bích Phương, traitimtrongvang (2nd version)	Tiên Cookie	tâm trạng tan hơi chậm một chút	2019–2020	
"Heat It Up" (Hâm Nóng)	Emily	Tiên Cookie, Phạm Thanh Hà, BigDaddy, Bình Gold	Trạm Cảm Xúc	2021	
"How Should I Behave When I'm Just That Pretty" (Khi Mình Xinh Thì Mình Làm Gì)	Emily, BigDaddy	Tiên Cookie		2019	
"Hungry Stomach" (Chiếc Bụng Đói)	Thanh Ngân	Tiên Cookie		2017	
"If We Ever Say Goodbye" (Có Khi Nào Rời Xa)	Bích Phương	Tiên Cookie	Chỉ Là Em Giấu Đi	2011	
"If You Still Wait For Me" (Còn Nơi Đó Chờ Em)	Đông Nhi	Tiên Cookie		2017	
"I Hide It Away" (Chỉ Là Em Giấu Đi)	Bích Phương	Tiên Cookie	Chỉ Là Em Giấu Đi	2013	
"I Pickily Choose My Lover" (Kén Cá Chọn Anh)	Bích Phương	Tiên Cookie, Phạm Thanh Hà		2020	
"I Want" (Em Muốn)	Bích Phương	Tiên Cookie	Chỉ Là Em Giấu Đi	2013	
"I Will Help You Up When You Fall" (Chị Ngả Em Nâng)	Bích Phương	Tiên Cookie, Phạm Thanh Hà	Dramatic	2018	
"Kiss You The Last Time" (Để Hôn Anh Lần Cuối)	Bảo Thy	Tiên Cookie	Để Hôn Anh Lần Cuối - Single	2014	
"Let's Fall In Love" (Mình Yêu Nhau Đi)	Bích Phương	Tiên Cookie	Mình Yêu Nhau Đi - Single	2014	
"Let's Go Party" ("Đi Đu Đưa Đi")	Bích Phương	Tiên Cookie, Phạm Thanh Hà		2019	
"Let's Not Fall In Love So Fast" (Chưa Yêu Vội)	Emily, Hạnh Sino	Tiên Cookie		2016	
"Let Us Be Still For A Moment" (Mình Cùng Nhau Đóng Băng")	Thùy Chi	Tiên Cookie, Thùy Chi		2018	
"Love Charm" (Bùa Yêu)	Bích Phương	Tiên Cookie, Phạm Thanh Hà		2018	
"Love Confession With Wine" (Mượn Rượu Tỏ Tình)	Emily, BigDaddy	Tiên Cookie, BigDaddy		2019	
"Missing Memories" (Ký Ức Ngủ Quên)	Bích Phương	Tiên Cookie		2015	
"Missing You In The Rain" (Mưa Nhớ)	Hòa Minzy	Tiên Cookie		2015	
"Missing You Suddenly" (Chợt Nhớ Về Anh)	Hồ Ngọc Hà	Tiên Cookie	Love Songs Collection 3: Gửi Người Yêu Cũ	2016	
"My Lovely Lover" (Người Tình Nhỏ Bé)	Emily, BigDaddy	Tiên Cookie, BigDaddy		2019	
"Perhaps I" (Có Lẽ Em)	Bích Phương	Tiên Cookie	Có Lẽ Em - Single	2012	
"Right Here Right Now" (Ngay Ở Đây Ngay Lúc Này)	Bích Phương	Tiên Cookie, Phạm Thanh Hà	Dramatic	2018	
"Savoring Sadness" (Thưởng Thức Nỗi Buồn)	Tiên Cookie	Tiên Cookie	Trạm Cảm Xúc	2021	
"Seasons Apart" (Mùa Xa Nhau)	Emily	Tiên Cookie	Mùa Xa Nhau - Single	2015	
"Seeing You Off" (Tiễn Khách)	Bích Phương	Tiên Cookie, Phạm Thanh Hà	Dramatic	2018	
"Shake It" (Ơ Sao Bé Không Lắc)	Emily, BigDaddy	Tiên Cookie, BigDaddy		2019	
"Silent Space" (Khoảng Lặng)	Bích Phương	Tiên Cookie	Chỉ Là Em Giấu Đi	2013	
"So It's Tết" (Thế Là Tết)	Đức Phúc, Hòa Minzy	Tiên Cookie, Phạm Thanh Hà		2018	
"Still" (Vẫn)	Bích Phương	Tiên Cookie	Chỉ Là Em Giấu Đi	2013	
"Talking To A Stranger" (Tâm Sự Với Người Lạ)	Tiên Cookie	Tiên Cookie	Tâm Sự Với Người Lạ - Single	2015	
"Teacher, Please Worry No More" (Thầy Đừng Lo Nữa)	Trung Quân	Tiên Cookie, Phạm Thanh Hà		2018	
"Time Will Tell" (Thời Gian Sẽ Trả Lời)	Tiên Cookie, JustaTee, BigDaddy	Tiên Cookie, JustaTee, BigDaddy	Sau Tất Cả - Single	2013	
"The Box" (Chiếc Hộp)	Bích Phương	Tiên Cookie, Phạm Thanh Hà	Trạm Cảm Xúc	2021	
"The Cat" (Chú Mèo)	Bích Phương	Tiên Cookie, Phạm Thanh Hà	Dramatic	2018	
"The One I've Been Searching For" (Người Em Tìm Kiếm)	Min	Tiên Cookie		2017	
"Those Last Days" (Những Ngày Cuối)	Tiên Cookie	Tiên Cookie		2016	
"To The Missing You" (Gửi Anh Xa Nhớ)	Bích Phương	Tiên Cookie		2016	
"Waiting On Valentine" (Valentine Chờ)	Tiên Cookie	Tiên Cookie		2008	
"Walking Towards The Sun" (Bước Về Phía Mặt Trời)	Văn Mai Hương, Xương Nhi	Tiên Cookie		2019	
"What Are You Doing Tonight" (Em Làm Gì Tối Nay)	Khắc Việt	Tiên Cookie	Ngại Yêu - Single	2015	
"Where You Are" (Nơi Nào Có Anh)	Bích Phương	Tiên Cookie		2015	
"You Are My Weakness" (Em Là Điểm Yếu Của Anh)	traitimtrongvang	Tiên Cookie	Trạm Cảm Xúc	2021	
"You Couldn't Keep It" (Anh Không Giữ)	Tiên Cookie, BigDaddy, Bích Phương	Tiên Cookie, BigDaddy	Sau Tất Cả - Single	2013	
"You Should Leave" (Vâng Anh Đi Đi)	Bích Phương	Tiên Cookie		2015	
"You Will Arrive Once Started" (Đi Rồi Sẽ Đến)	Erik	Tiên Cookie		2017	

== Awards and nominations ==
Year	Award	Category	Nominated work	Results	Ref.
2012	Green Wave Awards	Top 10 Popular Songwriters	Herself	Won	
2014	Green Wave Awards	Top 10 Popular Songwriters	Herself	Won	
2016	Green Wave Awards	Top 10 Popular Songwriters	Herself	Won	
2018	Green Wave Awards	Top 10 Songs Of The Year	"Love Charm"	Won	
2018	Green Wave Awards	Song Of The Year	"Love Charm"	Won	
2018	Green Wave Awards	Excellent Songwriting Team	Herself, Phạm Thanh Hà, Dương K	Won	
2019	Green Wave Awards	Top 10 Songs Of The Year	"Love Confession With Wine"	Won	
2019	Green Wave Awards	Top 10 Songs Of The Year	"Let's Go Party"	Won	
2019	Dedication Music Award	Music Producer Of The Year	Herself	Won	
2019	Dedication Music Award	Music Video Of The Year	"Love Charm"	Won	
2020	Green Wave Awards	Top 10 Songs Of The Year	"Have You Quit Smoking"	Won	
