= Daddy (2023 film) =

- Directed by: Neal Kelley; Jono Sherman
- Screenplay by: Neal Kelley; Jono Sherman
- Produced by: Sophia Kalin; Albee Zhang; Nate Nemon
- Starring: Yuriy Sardarov; Jacqueline Toboni; Pomme Koch; Britt Baron
- Distributed by: Anchor Bay Entertainment
- Release dates: 2023 (film festival release); April 15, 2025 (Anchor Bay Entertainment release)
- Country: United States
- Language: English

Daddy is an American science fiction comedy that began its film festival run in 2023 and was released by Anchor Bay Entertainment on April 15, 2025.

Daddy was the winner of the best film award at the 2023 Ridgefield Independent Film Festival.

It was written and directed by Neal Kelley and Jono Sherman and is their feature debut film.

== Plot ==
In a dystopian society where the state decides who is allowed to father children, a foursome of men gather at a government controlled retreat in the California mountains. There they must determine who among them can become fathers.

== Critical reception ==
Paste magazine, "Daddy brands itself a sci-fi comedy, and is haltingly funny, in fits and starts," concluding, "Daddy is too milquetoast to memorably deliver its opinion."
