= Raising Duncan =

American comic strip by Chris Browne

- Author(s): Chris Browne
- Website: www.gocomics.com/raising-duncan
- Current status/schedule: Ceased
- Launch date: August 16, 2000
- End date: January 2005
- Syndicate(s): Newspaper Enterprise Association
- Genre(s): Gag-a-day comics

Raising Duncan was a partly autobiographical, syndicated gag-a-day comic strip by Chris Browne. It ran from 2000 until 2005.

The story followed the lives of 'Big Daddy' and his wife Adelle. They were both novelists. Adelle, the more successful of the two, was an award-winning mystery writer. Big Daddy wrote romantic novels. They had two pets: Duncan, a black Scottie dog, after whom the strip was named, and a cat called Brambley.
