= Katri Daddi =

- Village
- Country: India
- State: Karnataka
- District: Belgaum

Government
  - Type: Panchayat raj

Languages
  - Official: Kannada
- Time zone: UTC+5:30 (IST)

Katri Daddi is a village in Belgaum district in Karnataka, India.

== Geography ==
KatriDaddi is a small rural village located in the Belagavi district of Karnataka, India, administratively under the Sampgaon Taluka. The village spans an area of approximately 422.51 hectares (≈4.23 km²), characterized by gently undulating terrain typical of this region of northern Karnataka.

The landscape consists primarily of agricultural fields, interspersed with small patches of uncultivated land and occasional natural vegetation. The soil in the area is generally fertile.
