= Big Daddy (Notorious B1 song) =

Song by Notorious B1

from the album Mississippi Doug$ Boyz
- Published: November 23, 1993
- Studio: Dragon Records
- Genre: Hip hop
- Length: 4:04
- Songwriter: Notorious B1

Snippet of "Big Daddy"

"Big Daddy" is a song by Mississippi-based rapper Notorious B1 (also known as Notorious Big1), from Mississippi Doug$ Boyz's self-titled album released on November 23, 1993. The song's beat samples "Juicy Fruit". The song is similar to the more-successful hit single "Juicy" by The Notorious B.I.G. It has been alleged that Sean "Diddy" Combs, the CEO of the Notorious B.I.G.'s record label Bad Boy Records, stole the song's beat, along with Notorious B1's name and flow. On the situation, Notorious B1 allegedly said "I want everybody to know the truth. I was the original Notorious Big One."

Notorious B1 had signed to Dragon Records, a record label based in Gulfport, Mississippi. He then collaborated with several other artists on an album produced by Tony (Dj Tony T) Harper and Jackie (Pete) Avery titled Mississippi Doug$ Boyz (pronounced Mississippi Dough Boys). One of the songs on the album, “Big Daddy”, was sent out to several record labels as a demo by Notorious B1.

The song resurfaced years after its release, with many noting its similarities to “Juicy”, with Notorious B1 coming out and saying how his name and song was copied. Some sources alleged that Diddy stole the song along with the name Notorious Big1, turning it into Notorious B.I.G., as he was looking for a name at the time.
