= JustaTee =

Vietnamese singer-songwriter (born 1990)

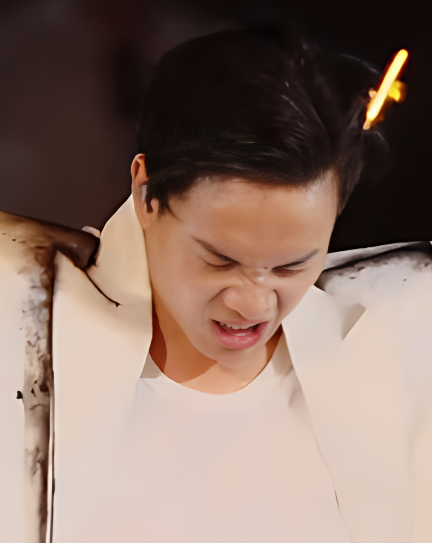
- JustaTee in 2024
- Born: Nguyễn Thanh Tuấn; November 1, 1990 (age 35); Hanoi, Vietnam
- Other name: JayTee
- Occupations: Singer-songwriter; Rapper; Recording producer
- Years active: 2004–present
- Awards: List
- Musical career
- Origin: Hanoi, Vietnam; Ho Chi Minh City, Vietnam
- Genres: V-pop; R&B; hip-hop; EDM; Folktronica; Dance-pop
- Instruments: Vocals; piano; organ; synth
- Labels: LadyKillah; SpaceSpeakers; Hoinamese

Nguyễn Thanh Tuấn (born November 1, 1990), commonly known by his stage name JustaTee (formerly JayTee), is a Vietnamese singer-songwriter, rapper, and record producer. He is a pioneer in pursuing R&B and has contributed to popularizing this music genre in Vietnam through his compositions. His music is highly regarded for its fresh melodies, simple, relatable lyrics, and influential impact.

JustaTee began his hip hop career under the stage name JayTee in 2004. He was a member of the group Click Click Boom before abandoning rap and focusing on R&B in 2008. In 2010, he collaborated with Lil' Knight (LK) to form the group LadyKillah and released notable songs such as "Người lạ nơi cuối con đường" and "Imma Heartbreaker," along with his debut mini album Just-a-Tee. In 2011, JustaTee was one of the first members to join SpaceSpeakers. He released award-winning songs at the Zing Music Awards, including "Candle in the Wind," “Forever Alone," and "Bâng Khuâng.”

From 2014, JustaTee reduced his musical activities, focusing on the restaurant business and relocating to the South. He later participated in the second season of Harmony of Light with BigDaddy in 2016. By 2017, he returned to the music scene and released hit songs like "I've Already Fallen Deeply for You," “The Crazy One," “Because of Love, I'll Charge Ahead," and "Going Home," earning him numerous nominations and awards at the Zing Music Awards, Làn Sóng Xanh, and Cống Hiến. Since 2020, JustaTee has served as a judge for four seasons of the Cống hiến Rap Việt program. He also took on the role of music director for the reality TV shows Anh trai "say hi" (2024) and Em xinh "say hi" (2025).

== Life and career ==
=== Background ===
Nguyen Thanh Tuan was born on November 1, 1990, in Hanoi. He comes from a large family with parents who are not involved in the arts, siblings, and relatives. Thanh Tuấn said his parents initially discouraged him from pursuing art because he was so passionate about it in high school, fearing it would affect his studies. Later, when he had a clear direction for his passion, he convinced his parents to trust and support him. While living with his parents in an apartment in Hanoi, Thanh Tuấn used his bedroom as both a recording studio and a workspace. He purchased all the studio equipment by saving up money from his performances. Thanh Tuấn was admitted to the University of Technology, Vietnam National University, Hanoi. In the first season of Rap Việt, he revealed that he had stopped studying to focus on his passion for music.

=== 2004–2010: Early career, LadyKillah, debut mini album ===
Thanh Tuấn pursued rap music while still in school in 2004, adopting the stage name JayTee, and often chose existing backing tracks from the Internet to perform. In 2005, JayTee became a member of Click Click Boom, Vietnam's first multi-member, multi-genre rap group, which disbanded in 2008 due to members' personal commitments. "Vô vọng" (Hopeless), a collaboration with singer Emily, was the first rap song that brought JayTee closer to his audience, which he later described as "terrible." He abandoned rap after realizing his voice had limitations because it wasn't "aggressive" or ‘edgy’ enough. JayTee grew to love and switched to pursuing R&B, which he considers "a close relative" of rap and "raps very well with R&B."

In 2009, "Tik Tak" was the first R&B song JayTee released. This was the opportunity that led him to meet and collaborate with rapper Lil' Knight (LK). LK was someone he felt was compatible and in sync with throughout the songwriting process. Also in 2009, JayTee released "Luv U Hater" (featuring rappers Andree Right Hand, Lil' BK, and BigDaddy) and pioneered the use of melodic rap to deliver the diss track's chorus. He worked at the M4Me studio alongside rappers Rhymastic and Young Uno. On March 3, 2010, JayTee and LK founded the group LadyKillah under the management of rapper Mr. J (Jan Saker). They also co-founded a major R&B/Hip hop website in Vietnam. The song "Không tin một sớm mai bình yên" (featuring LK) helped bring JayTee to the mainstream audience. From there, he continued to release songs that reached high positions on Vietnamese music charts in 2010, such as "Người lạ nơi cuối con đường" (collaboration with LK) and "Imma Heartbreaker" (collaboration with Emily and LK).

JayTee collaborated with LK and male rapper Eddy Việt to release "K (Part 2)," and teamed up with Andree Right Hand to release "Wrong Bitch." On August 20, 2010, he changed his stage name to JustaTee, a name derived from a song he liked. He said, "Back when I was a rapper, I went by JayTee [...] I decided to change my name to transition into singing R&B, and at the same time, I changed my stage name to mark a new chapter in my career." On the same day, JustaTee released his debut mini album Just-a-Tee, a product of his collaboration with the M4Me music academy, consisting of 5 songs: “Where's Mah Name” (featuring rapper Bueno and singer Mr. A), “Excuse Me” (featuring rapper Cá Chép), “Look at Me” (featuring singers P.A and Eddy Việt), “Imma Heartbreaker,” and “Play Girl” (featuring LK).

=== 2011–2016: SpaceSpeakers, first award, decision to expand south ===
On October 31, 2011, SpaceSpeakers was founded, and JustaTee became the first members of the group. That year, he released songs such as "Hoa sữa" (in collaboration with Mr. A, music producer Touliver, and singer Kimmese), "Xin anh đừng" (in collaboration with Emily and LK) and "Lonely Star" (in collaboration with LK and P.A.). In 2012, JustaTee released "She Neva Knows," "Real Love" (featuring Kimmese), "Vụt tan" (featuring male singer Soobin Hoàng Sơn), and "Người nào đó." He contributed vocals to "Tình cờ" (by Emily featuring LK), "Bật khóc" (by girl group B. Sily) and "Ngọn nến trước gió" (by LK featuring Andree Right Hand and Emily). Among these, "Candle in the Wind" quickly rose to the top of the Zing MP3 music chart and earned him the Rap Song of the Year award at the 2012 Zing Music Awards. In late 2012, he performed at the Underground Revolution hip-hop festival.

In early 2013, "Time Will Tell" by singer-songwriter and record producer Tiên Cookie was released, featuring collaborations with JustaTee and BigDaddy. Later, JustaTee released the song "Forever Alone." As an R&B track about a man embracing the single life, the song quickly went viral and became a hit for JustaTee. "Forever Alone" earned him the Song of the Year and R&B/Soul Song awards at the 2013 Zing Music Awards. In mid-2013, JustaTee began dating Trâm Anh, a popular influencer in Vietnam. He continued to release "Lời nói dối chân thật" (collaboration with Kimmese), "Cuộc gọi cuối (Last Call)" and "Crying Over You" (collaboration with rapper Binz).

JustaTee became less active in the Vietnamese music scene between 2014 and 2017. In 2014, he decided to leave his base in Hanoi and move south to Ho Chi Minh City, with the aim of "building a solid foundation." He revealed that he ran restaurants and cafes during that period to cover his expenses. Not long after, he returned to Hanoi because he found life in Ho Chi Minh City very difficult. That year, JustaTee released the single "Bâng khuâng," a song that helped him win the Favorite R&B/Soul Song award at the 2014 Zing Music Awards, and collaborated with singer Trịnh Thăng Bình in the concert program "Tôi tỏa sáng" on VTV9. In 2015, JustaTee contributed vocals to "Shine Your Light" by singer Min from St.319 Entertainment, collaborated with BigDaddy on ‘2AM’, and with singer Toc Tien and BigDaddy on "The Beat of Celebration".

In 2016, JustaTee continued his southern tour to join BigDaddy in the second season of the program Harmony of Light as contestants. By the fifth live show in February 2016, they performed a completely new song, "Coming Home for Tet," on the program and later released the song on online platforms. However, at the seventh live show, the duo JustaTee and BigDaddy became the team eliminated from the program. JustaTee considered this his second failed attempt at moving south, citing the reason "couldn't sustain it"—that without financial resources, he couldn't pursue music. "Dù anh có đứng lại" by JustaTee and BigDaddy, a song from Harmony of Light, was released on digital music platforms. By the end of 2016, he released "The Last Rain" in collaboration with Binz. After a year and a half of running his restaurant, he earned 200 million VND and decided to make his third attempt at moving south.

=== 2017–2020: Successful singles and Vietnamese rap ===
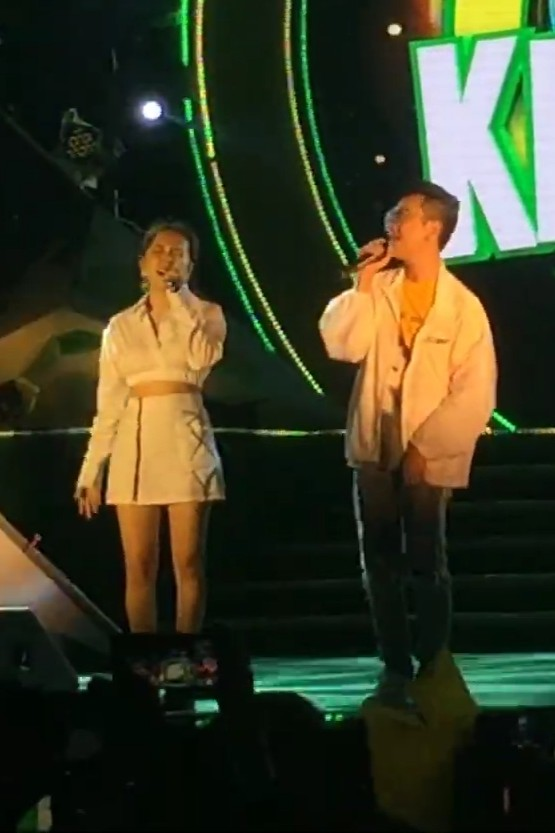
JustaTee and Phương Ly performed at Hanoi University of Civil Engineering (2019). They were dubbed a "power couple" by the media thanks to their hit collaborations.

On October 28, 2017, JustaTee featured on "Mặt trời của em" by singer Phương Ly. Over two weeks later, he released "Đã lỡ yêu em nhiều." Both songs quickly went viral, were enthusiastically received, and became hits for JustaTee. In 2018, he featured in "Guess What I'm Thinking" by rapper Đen, in collaboration with Biên. JustaTee collaborated with Phương Ly to release "The Crazy One." A pop song blending R&B and a touch of hip-hop, co-written by him and male streamer-turned-musician ViruSs, "Thằng điên" brought a fresh breeze to the Vietnamese music scene amid the saturation of ballad genres.

At the 2018 Zing Music Awards, JustaTee was nominated for Artist of the Year and Favorite Collaboration (with Phương Ly). "Đã lỡ yêu em nhiều" was nominated for Favorite R&B/Soul Song. "Thằng điên" won Favorite R&B/Soul Song and was nominated for Music Video of the Year. At the 2018 Làn Sóng Xanh Awards, "Đã lỡ yêu em nhiều" won the Top 10 Favorite Songs award, "Thằng điên" was nominated for Music Video of the Year, and JustaTee, along with Phương Ly and ViruSs, were nominated for Outstanding Collaboration. JustaTee received two nominations in the categories of New Artist of the Year and Music Video of the Year ("Thằng điên") at the 14th Contribution Music Awards.

In early 2019, JustaTee produced "Anh là ai" for Phương Ly. He then released "Hết mana" in collaboration with BigDaddy and rapper Bình Gold, and also teamed up with South Korean singer Hyomin of T-ara for "Cabinet". He released ‘Lus’ and collaborated with Min and Đen on the trending song "Vì yêu cứ đâm đầu". JustaTee was nominated in the Outstanding Collaboration category (with Min and Đen) at the 2019 Làn Sóng Xanh Awards. In 2020, JustaTee collaborated with singer Hoàng Thùy Linh and Đen to release "Làm gì phải hốt". He and Phương Ly released the song "Ta là" in collaboration with the British electronic music group Clean Bandit as part of the Tuborg Open 2019 music project. Later, JustaTee and singer Tiên Tiên released the song "Cần gì hơn".

In August 2020, JustaTee participated in the Rap Việt music television series as a judge alongside Rhymastic in the first season, which aired weekly on HTV2 (Vie Channel) and on the VieON online video streaming app. At the start of the show, JustaTee collaborated with Rhymastic, Binz, female rapper Suboi, and male rappers Karik and Wowy in "Đây là Rap Việt." He paired with male contestant rapper MCK in "Dân chơi xóm." Rap Việt won the Series of the Year award at the 16th Contribution Music Awards, TV Show of the Year at the 2020 WeChoice Awards, and was nominated for the 2020 Mai Vàng Award for Television Program.

In late 2020, JustaTee released "Birthday thọt" in collaboration with MCK and female rapper Tlinh (a contestant on Rap Việt), and contributed vocals to Min's "Mlem mlem" alongside male rapper Yuno Bigboi (also a Rap Việt contestant). He also contributed vocals to Đen's "Đi về nhà." This song helped both artists win the Music Video of the Year award at the 16th Contribution Music Awards, and three awards at the 2021 Blue Wave Awards, including Top 10 Favorite Songs, Outstanding Collaboration, and Favorite Song on Radio.

=== 2021–present: Continuing with Rap Việt and becoming music director ===
In 2021, JustaTee released promotional songs for various brands, including “Điều nhỏ bé thần kỳ,” two tracks ‘Ngọt’ and "Ta còn đây" (both featuring Rhymastic) and "Early Bird." In April 2021, he participated in the Rap Việt All-Star concert, featuring over 50 performances and approximately 10,000 attendees. JustaTee returned to Rap Việt for its second season as a judge alongside LK. He performed the show's theme song alongside Rhymastic, LK, Binz, Karik, and Wowy. In the finale, JustaTee teamed up with contestant rapper Hoàng Anh for the song "Oh My Goodness".

In early 2022, JustaTee released two songs, "O-đờ-hỏi-đỏ" and "Em không lẻ loi," followed shortly by music videos carrying humanitarian messages about children. He participated in "Mẹ vắng nhà, ba là siêu nhân" with his daughter Cici and son Mino. JustaTee served as the music consultant for Phương Ly's "Thích thích" and also appeared in the music video for the song. On November 15, 2022, SpaceSpeakers released the album Kosmik, marking the group's 11-year journey of activity and development, in which JustaTee released the song "Forget About Her" in collaboration with Touliver and contributed vocals to the song "A Veil of Mist" alongside Binz, Rhymastic, and Soobin Hoàng Sơn. Earlier, on November 12, 2022, he performed at the Kosmik Live Concert, which featured over 50 of his performances, the remaining 10 SpaceSpeakers artists, and guest performers. The concert was fined 110 million VND for sensitive performances.

In 2023, JustaTee released the single "Ez Papa". He returned to Rap Việt for its third season as a judge alongside Suboi and Karik, while also becoming the show's music director, replacing SpaceSpeakers. JustaTee kicked off the show with the song "We Go Hard" alongside Suboi, Karik, BigDaddy, Andree Right Hand, and two Thai male rappers, VG and B Ray. Male rapper Double2T was the contestant he saved, and also collaborated with him on "Tay-Lai Pr0" in the finale, going on to win the Rap Việt championship this season. On October 7, 2023, JustaTee became the music director of Rap Việt All-Star 2023 and performed at the concert. Rap Việt All-Star 2023 lasted four hours, featuring 200 artists with over 40 performances and 10,000 attendees. In November 2023, he was honored by Facebook as the Outstanding Content Creator of the Day at the VCPMC Music Copyright Workshop.

In 2024, JustaTee collaborated with BigDaddy and Double2T to release "Về nhà ăn Tết 2" (Home for Tet 2). He became the music director of the weekly program Anh trai "say hi" (Brother "say hi") broadcast on HTV2 (Vie Channel). JustaTee stated that through this program, not only would the contestants undergo a process of self-improvement, but he himself would also upgrade himself on a new journey. Anh trai "say hi" received an enthusiastic reception, with many songs topping the music charts. The show's tour attracted 130,000 viewers over four nights. At the same time, JustaTee returned to Rap Việt for its fourth season as both a judge and music director. He kicked off the show with "No Limit," featuring collaborations with Thai VG, Karik, Suboi, BigDaddy, and B Ray. In the finale, JustaTee teamed up with contestant rapper CoolKid for "Cu con." In late 2024, JustaTee confirmed his role as music director for the WeChoice Awards 2024, as well as overseeing the production and release of the award ceremony's theme album featuring six different tracks. In the album, he released the song "Giàu nhất khu phù hoa" in collaboration with male rappers Wxrdie, Gill, Dangrangto, and Robber.

In 2025, JustaTee became the music director for the program Em xinh "say hi", He also released the song "Jasmine Flower" in June. In September of the same year, he participated in the production of Lamoon's album "Là Moon" and also contributed vocals for the duet song "Lắm mồm" (stylized as "Lammom"), which is also included in this album. In December, he produced the song "Kèo thơm," a single from Hằng BingBoong's EP of the same name.

== Artistry ==
=== Influences ===
JustaTee is influenced by songs from the United States, the birthplace of R&B music. He admits that he enjoys downloading and listening to many American songs, just to study how those artists compose their songs. JustaTee is particularly fond of artists such as Michael Jackson and Usher. They are people from whom he has learned a lot through their song performances, emotional expressions, and unique styles. In addition, he also loves artists such as Taylor Swift, Justin Timberlake, Jay-Z, Alicia Keys, Brian McKnight, and R. Kelly. In Vietnamese music, JustaTee was passionate about Bằng Kiều's music and singing voice, especially the song "Trái tim bên lề" (Heart on the Sidelines), which he always wanted to perform whenever he went to karaoke. In Korean music, he was impressed by "Leaked Song," a demo by music producer Brave Brothers, and the group Big Bang from YG Entertainment.

JustaTee is one of the pioneering artists experimenting with, exploring, and bringing a true definition of the R&B and melodic rap genres to Vietnam. He compares rap to be more challenging than R&B in terms of wordplay, puns, or metaphors, while R&B excels in expressing emotions through rhythm and pitch. This is why JustaTee pursues R&B music, as he wants to express more emotions through each note. Since R&B first entered Vietnam, he has pursued and studied it to accumulate knowledge and rules from notes to song structures to compose songs purely in this genre. Therefore, JustaTee is nicknamed the "R&B guy," stemming from his compositions that most accurately represent the essence of R&B when the genre was introduced to Vietnam. Initially, during his early years, JustaTee's R&B music was always considered unsuitable for the tastes of the Vietnamese music market at that time, which only favored ballads and lively dance pop. Later, as ballads became saturated, songs like "Đã lỡ yêu em nhiều" and "Thằng điên" became popular and made a big splash on the Vietnamese music market. As a result, JustaTee was considered a "trendsetter."

=== Composition and production ===
In the early stages of his career, unlike the "cool" style of underground artists, JustaTee was also known for his simple image and lighthearted music with simple and sincere lyrics. Later, this style had a great influence on the younger generation as it was easily addictive. In his early songs, JustaTee chose to collaborate with artists such as Kimmese, Mr. A, Emily, and Soobin based on their strengths. JustaTee composes music in a variety of styles and tones, with the aim of making his songs more diverse in both style and emotion.

As an underground artist, JustaTee didn't focus on studio production. He said that basic equipment was sufficient because the songs "weren't really necessary to develop to the point of becoming mainstream." All of JustaTee's music production and songwriting at the time were entirely self-taught without formal training, yet he still ensured technical proficiency in recording and musical production. JustaTee shared that his songs often include English lines due to the influence of foreign music, and that incorporating English lyrics into his songs felt appropriate.

JustaTee is known as a creative advertising music composer who delivers high visibility, with hit songs such as "Về nhà ăn Tết" (Come Home for Tet), "Đi về nhà" (Go Home), and "Mlem Mlem" becoming his signature hits. He stated that while many people find advertising music unpleasant, as if it were forced upon them, "I want to prove to everyone that advertising music is no different from a regular song." When he returned to music in 2017 and began collaborating on advertisements, JustaTee revealed to Forbes that it took him 4 to 5 days just sitting in front of the computer screen, pondering the melody and searching for lyrics like a mine detector, "naturally, an idea would flash in that mess. From then on, I wrote like a madman, as if I had struck gold.“ He once likened the process of translating music for advertising campaigns to a "musical torture."

During the production of Rap Việt season three until Anh trai "say hi," JustaTee owned a 20 m^{2} songwriting and recording studio in his private home in District 2, Ho Chi Minh City. He composed and produced hip hop songs as well as many other genres of music. Regarding Anh trai "say hi," JustaTee considered it a major challenge because he had to work intensely to compose for 30 contestants with diverse styles. Both Rap Việt and Anh trai "say hi" achieved success, successively reaching the top of the charts and dominating recognition. Some artists from these programs have also established a solid presence in Vietnam's entertainment market, such as Rhyder and Pháp Kiều. However, Nam Tran of Tri Thuc noted that JustaTee still has weaknesses in creating a personal style in his music products, as he focuses entirely on making them easy to listen to, catchy, and appealing. Piling all the songwriting work on him in a short period of time inevitably led to songs being produced "half-baked."

=== Vocals ===
JustaTee admits that singing voice is a barrier to performing R&B in Vietnam, as he lacks the rich voice and wide vocal range of international artists, and cannot perform the subtle vocal techniques they use. R&B requires many elements such as strong breath control, high voice, rich voice, and the ability to flexibly handle musical notes. These are major difficulties for those who have not undergone professional training like him. JustaTee's singing voice was once criticized for being too thin and unprofessional. To improve his voice, he focused more on backing vocals and thereby deepened his tone. Later, that backing vocals became a distinctive feature of JustaTee's vocal style. In the first season of Rap Việt, Binz remarked that any song hook featuring JustaTee's vocals was a stroke of luck.

== Cultural status ==
=== Public Image ===
JustaTee is someone who avoids controversies to polish his image in the Vietnamese entertainment industry. He once said that it "is just news or stories about life and directly targets the audience's curiosity. It's like a double-edged sword. If you overuse it, you will one day cut your own hand." After entering mainstream music, JustaTee, like many other artists, was criticized by the underground community for "losing his essence." He spent many years stuck between the two schools of underground and mainstream music. Later, JustaTee no longer placed much emphasis on image. He shared with WeChoice that although he doesn't consider himself underground, his lifestyle and music are strongly underground. Later, when the R&B genre became popular in Vietnam, JustaTee was considered a pioneer in blurring the lines between underground and mainstream, and an artist who inspired young artists with his passion for music.

=== Business ===
Since the beginning of his career, JustaTee has pursued music in a carefree and somewhat emotional way. However, later on, he realized that art is a luxury field, and to have a music product, one first needs financial resources. He once sought sponsorship from brands to fund the production of music videos but was rejected. Therefore, JustaTee focused on business for 4 years from 2013 to 2017, becoming less active in the music field. The reason was not only to earn money to invest in products but also because he has an entrepreneurial spirit. He once produced "I've Already Loved You So Much" with his own finances without relying on any sponsorship, and said that "I'm willing to spend 2 to 3 times the amount I invest in the product." After this period, JustaTee went to Ho Chi Minh City to balance his business and music career. He collaborated with friends to open 16 businesses including restaurants, cafes and bubble tea shops, such as the Thai restaurant Chai Talay and the bubble tea shop Aroi.

In 2015, he collaborated with the Cornetto ice cream brand to become a judge for the "Shake It Off" competition, winning tickets to Singapore to enjoy Taylor Swift's The 1989 World Tour. JustaTee is one of the Vietnamese artists who actively participates in composing songs and making music videos to promote brands. Since becoming more well known with "I've Fallen in Love with You So Much", he has started collaborating with brands more often. In the video "Going Home for Tet", JustaTee advertised for the Samsung Galaxy J7 Prime phone. Many of his songs were released to promote brands such as the video game Arena of Valor published by Garena, the digital banking application ViettelPay, the video game OMG 3Q published by VNG, the spice brand Chin-su, the Korean food delivery company Baemin, the mineral water brand Lavie, the beer brand Heineken N.V., the courier brand J&T Express, the video game Rise of Kingdoms, and the Italian baby care product brand Chicco.

=== Social activities ===
In 2022, JustaTee was the first artist to participate in the Music for Your Smile Project. Through this project, he released "Em không lẻ loi" (I'm Not Alone) as a voice for many people regarding the issue of child abuse, as well as a message of support for children in difficult circumstances who are struggling to make a living. JustaTee also called for support and fundraising through the Saigon Children's Charity CIO to support orphans due to the COVID-19 pandemic in Vietnam.

== Personal life ==
JustaTee developed feelings for Nguyen Tram Anh during a music event. At that time, both he and Tram Anh were at the same place for filming, and their meeting was brief, consisting of only two greetings. Tram Anh appeared in JustaTee's music video "Last Call" as the female lead. He married Tram Anh at the end of March 2018 after 5 years of dating.

After getting married, his wife gave birth to their first daughter in October of the same year, affectionately nicknamed Cici (Nguyen Anh Chi). In February 2021, he had another son named Mino (Nguyen Anh Minh). As of June 2023, JustaTee's real estate portfolio included a large house in Tay Ho, Hanoi and a five-story villa in Ho Chi Minh City.
