= Daddy (nickname) =

"Daddy" is a nickname for:

- Arun Gawli (born 1955), Indian gangster and politician, founder of the political party Akhil Bharatiya Sena
- Evgenii Dadonov (born 1989), Russian ice hockey player in the National Hockey League
- Rowland Hill, 1st Viscount Hill (1772–1842), general and Commander-in-Chief of the British Army
- Frederick Charles Victor Laws (1887–1975), Royal Air Force group captain, aerial surveyor and the founder of British aerial reconnaissance
- Jim Neal (1930–2011), American National Basketball Association player
- Robert Daddy Potts (1898–1981), a football player in the 1926 National Football League season
- Thomas D. Rice (1808–1860), American blackface minstrel show entertainer
- Joe Stevenson (born 1982), semi-retired mixed martial artist
- Moses Wilkinson (1746/47–?), African-American runaway slave and Methodist preacher
- Daddy Warbucks, a major character in the comic strip Little Orphan Annie
- Reginald "Daddy" McDonald, a fictional character in the soap opera Number 96

== See also ==
- Big Daddy (disambiguation)
- Dad (nickname)
- Pappy
- Pop (nickname)
- Pops (nickname)
