= Văn Mai Hương =

Vietnamese singer

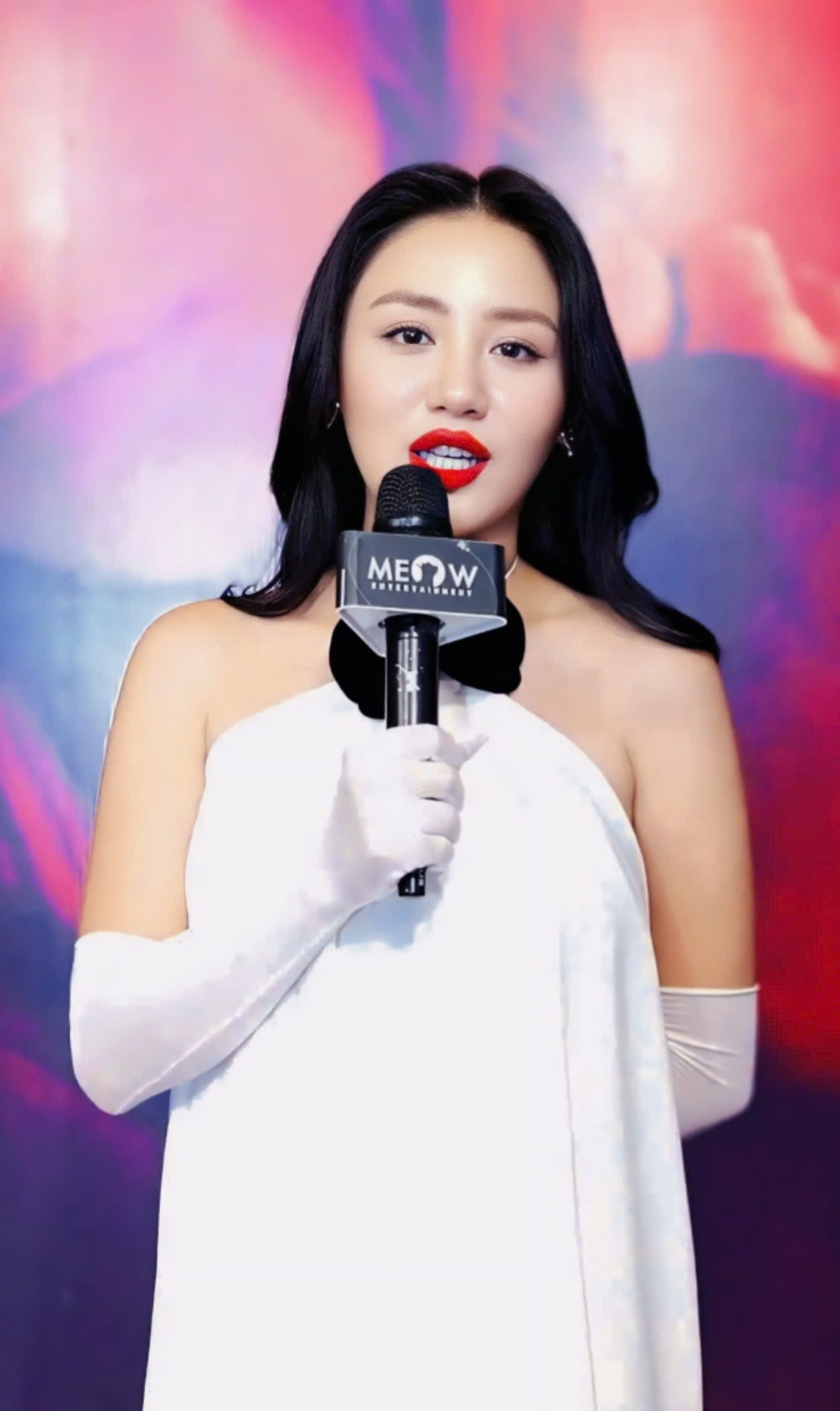
- Hương in 2023
- Born: Văn Mai Hương; 27 September 1994 (age 32); Hanoi, Vietnam
- Occupations: Singer; songwriter
- Years active: 2010–
- Musical career
- Genres: Pop; R&B; EDM

Văn Mai Hương (born 27 September 1994 in Hanoi) is a Vietnamese Pop Music singer. She was the runner-up of Season 3 of Vietnam Idol in 2010.

== Career ==
=== 2010: Vietnam Idol ===
As a participant of the third season of Vietnam Idol, she was the youngest among the top 10 contestants and was known as a highly technical performer.

=== 2011-2012: Debut "Nếu như anh đến" and the debut album Hãy mỉm cười ===
After Vietnam Idol, she released a sponsored song "Ngày mới trắng hồng" in partnership with an international cosmetics brand.

In June 2011, she released her official single "Nếu như anh đến" (translated: As If You'd Shown Up), a dance-pop/R&B song written by Nguyễn Đức Cường and produced by Huy Tuấn. It was released digitally on Zing platforms and as an EP. That August, she release a Music Video directed by Film Ninja Productions that featured both an acoustic and the official electronic version of the songs while also celebrating the burgeoning singer-songwriter cafe scene of Vietnam.

The success of "Nếu như anh đến", led to a second single "Ngày chung đôi" and her first album. "Hãy mỉm cười". Upon the release of the album, Văn Mai Hương remarked, "At 17 years old, I don't want to perform songs that might feel too old for my character and personality. I wanted to make music for my fellow teenagers. I want to make pop music that is dignified and modern to help create my distinct artistic identity.

=== 2013-2017: New Genres with Mười tám+, Mona Lisa, and Ngay Gan Anh ===
In 2013, Hương released her second album "Mười tám +", where she released down-tempo ballads and R&B, alongside the dance-pop she had become known for.

In 2014, she collaborated with Dương Triệu Vũ to release "Ngày gần anh". She would win "Favorite Female Singer at the 2014 HTV Awards. Soon after, she would cancel many shows and withdraw from the industry, later pointing to her struggles with Depression. She would come back at the end of 2015 with the single "Mona Lisa", a collaboration with Khắc Hưng and contained elements of Swing-Jazz In 2016, she would feature in Phạm Hồng Phước's song "Thời thanh xuân sẽ qua".

=== 2018-2021: "Hương (Scent)" ===
In 2021, she released her third full album "Hương (Scent)".

== Discography ==
=== Albums ===
- Minh Tinh (2023)

=== Singles ===
Title	Year		
Title	Year	"Nếu Như Anh Đến"	2011
"Một Ngày Mới"			2011
"Ngày Chung Đôi"	2012		
"Chậm Lại Một Phút"	2013		
"Chuyện Tình Nhà Thơ"	2013		
"Giấc Mơ Thức Tỉnh"	2014		
"Là Em Đó"	2014		
"Tìm" (with Trúc Nhân)	2014		
"Ngày Gần Anh"	2014		
"Monalisa"	2015		
"Beautiful"	2016		
"Lâu Đài Cát"	2017		
"Nghĩ Về Anh"	2018		
"Cầu Hôn" (Happy Version)	2019		
"Nghe Nói Anh Sắp Kết Hôn" (feat. Bùi Anh Tuấn)	2019		
"Đốt"	2020		
"Hương"	2021		
"Chim Quý Trong Lồng" (with KHÁNH)	2021		
"Let's Talk About Love" (with Châu Đăng Khoa & Blacka)	2021		
"Một Ngàn Nỗi Đau"	2022		
"Hoa Không Hương" (with KHÁNH)	2022		
"Mưa Tháng Sáu" (feat. GREY D & Trung Quân)	2023		
"Đại Minh Tinh"	2023		
"Cầu Vồng Lấp Lánh" (feat. Myra Trần)
"Cho Phép Tôi Mời Anh Một Ly" (feat. Vương Bình)
"Một "Thế giới" = 2 gang tay" (demo)	2024		

=== Promotional singles ===
Title	Year		
Title	Year	"Điều Tự Nhiên Nhất"	2017
"Rồi Mình Sẽ Gặp Nhau"	2019		
"Ước Mơ Của Mẹ" (with Hứa Kim Tuyền)	2020		
"Tách Trà Thanh Xuân"	2021		
"Hạnh Phúc Xuân" (with Bùi Anh Tuấn)	2022		
