= The Purple Horizon =

The Purple Horizon Chân trời tím
- Directed by: Lê Hoàng Hoa
- Screenplay by: Văn Quang (novel)
- Produced by: Quốc Phong
- Starring: Hùng Cường; Kim Vui; Mộng Tuyền; Hà Huyền Chi; Trần Đỗ Cung
- Cinematography: Châu Tùng; Nguyễn Văn Đông; Huỳnh Ngọc Trai
- Edited by: Tăng Thiên Tài; Lưu Trạch Hưng
- Music by: Hoàng Trọng; Phạm Đình Chương
- Production companies: Mỹ Vân Films; Liên Ảnh Motion Picture
- Distributed by: Mỹ Vân Films; Vietnam National Institute of Film
- Release date: 1971
- Running time: 95 minutes
- Country: Republic of Vietnam
- Language: Vietnamese
- Budget: ₫14 million
- Box office: ₫94 million

The Purple Horizon (Vietnamese: Chân trời tím) is a 1971 Vietnamese 35mm eastmancolor film directed by Lê Hoàng Hoa. So far, it has been recognized as the largest Vietnamese film, considering the number of actors and weapons.

== Plot ==
The love story occurred during the struggle against the dictatorship of the people of the Republic of Vietnam.

A non-commissioned officer is put in the situation that must always run back and forth between conscience and responsibility. A young woman is conflicted by love and money, low lust and non-profit lifestyle.

It has no complete ending, but in some way, it forced everyone to think about the values of love, dignity and cruelty coming from heartlessness.

== Production ==
Location is Saigon during 3 months of the year 1971.

=== Art ===
- Type : Romance, war, feature.
- Studio : Mỹ Vân Films (Mỹ-Vân Điện-ảnh Công-ti), Liên Ảnh Motion Picture (Liên-Ảnh Công-ti)
- Print : National Cinema Centre (Trung-tâm Quốc-gia Điện-ảnh)
- Digital : Spectra Films Studio (2015)
- Director : Lê Hoàng Hoa
- Screenplay : Văn Quang
- Dialogue : Mai Thảo

=== Cast ===
- Hùng Cường ... Phi
- Kim Vui ... Liên
- Thanh Lan ... Phượng
- Mộng Tuyền ... Loan
- Ánh Nga
- Bảo Ân ... Điền, Liên's younger brother
- Ngọc Đức
- Hà Huyền Chi
- Trần Đỗ Cung ... Lieutenant Colonel Lạc
- Ngọc Phu
- Khả Năng ... A logistics officer
- Bà Năm Sadec ... Phi's mother
- Phạm Đình Chương ... A bar musician
- [...]

== See also ==
- Cards on the Table
- From Sàigòn to Điện-biên-fủ
- Land of Sorrows
- Love Storm
- Peace
- The Everning Sunshine
- The Faceless Lover
