= Cards on the Table (Vietnamese telefilm) =

Cards on the Table Ván bài lật ngửa
- Directed by: Khôi Nguyên
- Screenplay by: Nguyễn Trương Thiên Lý (novel); Khôi Nguyên
- Produced by: Việt Thanh
- Starring: Nguyễn Chánh Tín; Thúy An; Thanh Lan; Lâm Bình Chi; Phan Hiền Khánh
- Cinematography: Nguyễn Văn Hòa
- Edited by: Khôi Nguyên
- Music by: Thanh Tùng; Y Vân
- Production company: Giai Phong Film Studio
- Distributed by: VTV; HTV; Phuong Nam Cultural Corporation; Vietnam National Institute of Film
- Release date: 1982
- Running time: 90 minutes × 8 chaps
- Country: Vietnam
- Languages: Vietnamese; English; French; Yue Chinese; Japanese

Cards on the Table (Vietnamese: Ván bài lật ngửa, Chinese: 牌中牌) is a 1982–88 Vietnamese 35mm black and white film directed by Lê Hoàng Hoa in his art name Khôi Nguyên.

== Background ==
In the year 1982, it was known as the time of the 5th National Congress of the Central Committee of the Communist Party of Vietnam. This event has appeared in a period that is still considered to be the recession of the people's confidence in the capabilities of the leaders. Within two years before the opening of the Congress, the propaganda agencies of the Communist Party and the Government of Vietnam have received the instruction of operating at full capacity to revive the spirit of the public.

Telefilm Cards on the Table was originally one of the film projects submitted by the Ho Chi Minh City Party Committee to the supreme agency for approval. It was a literary script of author Nguyễn Trương Thiên Lý, whose real name was Trần Bạch Đằng and a reputable historical researcher. He was also a resistance leader with an important position in Saigon.

Trần Bạch Đằng's intention was to make only a simple movie about the fate of intelligence Phạm Ngọc Thảo, who was only called as "Mr. Chín T." for contemporary safety reasons. However, when the handwritten script was sent to the filmmaker Lê Hoàng Hoa, who took the initiative to revise it into a film with many parts, and fictional more details and characters. Invisible, Cards on the Table has become an extremely attractive adventure spy series.

This project has been granted a huge amount of funding in the context of the Vietnamese economy was seriously degraded. However, when the film was released, it caused a huge fan trend in society throughout the 1980s. Therefore, when the scenario was published in the form of a novel, writer Trần Bạch Đằng decided to use title Cards on the Table (Ván bài lật ngửa, Lê Hoàng Hoa's creation) instead of Between the Spear Sea and the Sword Forest (Giữa biển giáo rừng gươm), while retaining some details and characters from Lê Hoàng Hoa's development.

== Plot ==
A story based on the life of sleeper agent Albert Phạm Ngọc Thảo with character Robert Nguyễn Thành Luân (Nguyễn Chánh Tín) during 1956–63.

Its title Cards on the Table stems from the habit of playing cards in Chợ Lớn residents, where filmmaker Lê Hoàng Hoa and many colleagues have been attached since childhood.

=== Summary ===
Nguyễn Thành Luân in the cover of an electric engineer who was bored of life in the forest with Vietcong, so he asked to return to the national justice. Luân, with the name of a good pious sheep, gradually received the trust of Bishop Ngô Đình Thục and his brothers in the Ngô family.

The man is forced to go between two very dangerous streams, when both the enemy and comrades do not really trust him. However, Luân, with his own career skills and his own hunches, has repeatedly escaped death to contribute to the righteous.

The ups and downs of Nguyễn Thành Luân is also almost the hot reality of Vietnamese political and social context after World War II.

=== List of episodes ===
1. 1982 : The Foster Son of the Archbishop (Đứa con nuôi vị giám mục)
2. 1983 : The Roving Chessman (Quân cờ di động)
3. 1983 : The Gunshot on the Highland (Phát súng trên cao nguyên)
4. 1984 : The Flood and the Tango No. 3 (Cơn hồng thủy và bản tango số 3)
5. 1985 : The Blue Sky in the Split of Leaf (Trời xanh qua kẽ lá)
6. 1986 : The Last Warning (Lời cảnh cáo cuối cùng)
7. 1987 : The High Pressure and the Freshet (Cao áp và nước lũ)
8. 1987 : The Wreath at the Grave (Vòng hoa trước mộ)

=== Figures ===
- Robert Nguyễn Thành Luân: The main protagonist, son of a Catholic landlord in Cochinchina and had graduated as an electric engineer in Paris before working for the Vietcong.
- Kiên: A silver-haired French-Vietnamese man who collaborated with the French as well as Hoa Nationalist Chinese sympathizers in Chợ Lớn, Saigonese gangsters, FULRO forces in the Central Highlands, and drug traffickers in the Golden Triangle.
- Lý Kai: A Nationalist Chinese spy under the cover of an opium addict.
- Thùy Dung: A female Vietcong spy posted to South Vietnam. She soon became Luân's wife.
- Bảy Cầu Muối: A former gangster who became Luân's assistant.

== Production ==
The first scenes began to shoot in 1981, and the final scenes were completed in 1986. This is also known as the second film (the first film is The Purple Horizon) with huge amounts of actors and weapons.

According to the memoirs of director Lê Hoàng Hoa, he was being imprisoned at Chí Hòa Prison for illegally crossing the sea in 1980. That trip even killed his wife and son. He intended to commit suicide in the grief and despair. At that moment, there was a special order at the senior agency to release Lê Hoàng Hoa. The police summoned him to make a strange suggestion: He had to return to film if he did not want to continue in jail. Lê Hoàng Hoa reluctantly approved, an action that he himself did not understand why. However, it was not until the 1990s that the truth was revealed: Party Secretary of Ho Chi Minh City, Võ Văn Kiệt, took advantage of all his influence to save Lê Hoàng Hoa and many other artists, who were included in the list of the crew of Cards on the Table.

Initially, Lê Hoàng Hoa intended to invite Trần Quang or Hùng Cường, the most popular actors at that time. However, they refused. Finally, John decided to give the main role to Nguyễn Chánh Tín, a little-known male singer. Chánh Tín was just released after his sea trip failed.

According to actor Phan Hiền Khánh's memoirs, the crew had to go to the scene under the supervision of security officers, whom without wearing their uniforms. All those who participated in the telefilm, whether they were the main or secondary, received a very low remuneration. However, they connected each other with their love for cinema. Therefore, this film opened up a period of strong development of Vietnamese cinema and made many actors becoming stars in the admiration of many generations of public.

=== Art ===
- Make-up: Tường Vi
- Fire designer: Lê Chánh
- Art designer: Ngô Hữu Phước
- Camera: Trần Ngọc Huỳnh

=== Sountracks ===
- Nhạc đề (Theme music of cards on the table) by Y Vân
- Con thuyền không bến (Boat without a harbour) by Đặng Thế Phong
- Mưa rừng (Forest rain) by Huỳnh Anh
- Biết nói gì đây (Do not know what to say) by Huỳnh Anh
- Ai lên xứ hoa đào (Who visit to the land of peach blossom) by Hoàng Nguyên
- Soochow serenade (蘇州夜曲, Soshū yakyoku) by Ryōichi Hattori

=== Cast ===
- Nguyễn Chánh Tín ... Robert Nguyễn Thành Luân, sir Engineer
- Thúy An ... Thùy Dung (episode 1–2–3)
- Thanh Lan ... Thùy Dung (episode 4-5-6-7-8)
- Lâm Bình Chi ... Advisor Ngô Đình Nhu
- Ngô Thế Dũng ... President Ngô Đình Diệm
- Thu Hồng ... First Lady Trần Lệ Xuân
- Đỗ Văn Nghiêm ... Archbishop Pierre Martin Ngô Đình Thục
- Huyền Anh ... Doctor Trần Kim Tuyến
- Robert Hải ... G. Frederick Reinhardt
- Lan Chi ... AP reporter Hélen Fanfani
- Bùi Thương Tín ... Major Lưu Kỳ Vọng
- Cai Văn Mỹ ... Lí Kai
- Phan Hiền Khánh ... Bảy Cầu Muối
- Đặng Trí Hoàng Sơn ... Lại Văn Sang
- Việt Thanh ... Lại Hữu Tài
- Vương Hồng Đặng ... Grand Master Phạm Công Tắc
- Trần Quang ... Y Mur Eban, FULRO leader
- Trần Quang Đại ... Quyến or Officer Lê Ngân
- Lê Cung Bắc ... Oldman
- Kiều Hạnh ... Oldwoman
- Lê Chánh
- Lý Hùng ... Thường
- Trần Minh Dậu
- Minh Hoàng
- Tư Lê
- Nguyễn Cung
- Nguyễn Ngân ... Trần Văn Đôn
- Khương Mễ ... Đường Nghĩa
- Diễm My ... Service woman
- Hồng Lực ... Doctor Nguyễn Tôn Hoàn, Daiviet leader
- Jan ... Kiên, the silver-headed guy
- Hùng An ... Sáu Thưng
- Lê Minh Tuấn ... Cop Mi Ngọc
- Lâm Thế Thành ... Sa
- Nguyễn Văn Lũy ... Mạch Điền
- Chế Tâm ... James Casey
- Mỹ Trinh ... Tiểu Phụng
- Mạc Can ... Magician
- Minh Hà ... Lily
- Nguyễn Bá Lộc
- Kiều Mai Lý ... Actress Thiên Kim

== Influence ==
=== Poetics ===
The original plan of Giaiphong Film Studio was a 2-hour movie, which was shown in theaters. However, due to the positive impact of the filmmaker Lê Hoàng Hoa, the script has grown many times. Therefore, it was born in a special condition: The entire film making process has been made by the quality of movies. Every two episodes (in eight episodes) were completed, they were shown in the theater to create a budget for the government, then shown again on television. Therefore, the Vietnamese press has begun to call this form as telefilm (phim truyền hình).

Also from the original intention, writer Trần Bạch Đằng just wanted to comply with the principles of socialist realism, in which, the image of the main character must contain the good qualities of the revolutionary ideal, thereby propagating the position of the Communist Party. However, director Lê Hoàng Hoa, who has studied for ten years in Hollywood, rejected all those patterns. He decided to exploit the factors that made the success of James Bond and Stierlitz to recreate Nguyễn Thành Luân in a completely different form, which was more vivid and ordinary. That is why Nguyễn Trương Thiên Lý's revolutionary heroism has been transformed into Khôi Nguyên's superheroism. In addition, the significance of propaganda has been replaced by the element of entertainment.

According to Lê Hoàng Hoa's design, the characters, whether good or evil, must act very accurately and almost never make mistakes or excess movements. The element what makes the attraction of each episode is improvised angles and very logical transitions. For example : The last scene of an episode, when Luân and Dung were discussing the work they did, suddenly had a "Raise your hands !" voice and the gun barrel pointed at them, end of film ; the first scene of the next episode, Luân and Dung still remained calm, because the one who threatened them turned out to be Quyến, he was also a spy. Thus, the audiences had to always be eager to wait for the next episode to know the development, which the cinema of Vietnam before 1980 did not have yet.

Over the decades since Cards on the Table was released, the propaganda articles of the Government of Vietnam usually repeated that, it was almost like a victory because has contributed to strengthening the people's beliefs in the leadership of the communists. It is still said to have put the communists in many difficult situations to forge their will. However, for the public, especially the young people, the two things that make the telefilm's appeal are explained as follows: The presence of all historical celebrities in the First Republic of Vietnam (1960–1963), the danger and unpredictability from the affairs of Engineer Nguyễn Thành Luân. The audiences always expected the competition with wisdom between Luân and the silver-headed guy. In it, the silver-head guy is always in a hidden position, which is easy to associate SPECTRE from the 007 series. Besides, Nguyễn Thành Luân's adventures have led to close connections to typical events that have taken place in modern Vietnam history.

=== Release ===
Nguyễn Chánh Tín is a popular actor and singer in Saigon since prior to 1975. Born in Bạc Liêu, he was the youngest of five children. He is the uncle of Vietnamese-American actors, Dustin Nguyen and Johnny Tri Nguyen, and famous comedian Vân Sơn, who is also the owner of Van Son Entertainment. During the early 1970s, Nguyễn Chánh Tín's good looks earned him a status of being somewhat of a cinema heartthrob. He portrayed the lead character, Robert Nguyễn Thành Luân, in Cards on the Table which has been considered by many as his signature film role. Actress Thúy An starred as his leading lady for the first three out of the series of 8 episodes altogether. Although Thúy An's portrayal of the female lead character in Cards on the Table had been well received, in 1984 her pregnancy would cause her to be replaced by Thanh Lan for parts 4, 5 and 6, as shooting had been scheduled for all three parts in that year. The chemistry between Nguyễn Chánh Tín and Thanh Lan on screen gained even wider reception from movie audiences, which prompted the film's producers' decision to also cast Thanh Lan in the remaining last two sequels of the series.

== See also ==
- The Advisor
- Seventeen Moments of Spring
