= Operation C.I.A. =

1965 film by Christian Nyby

- Original film poster
- Directed by: Christian Nyby
- Written by: Bill S. Ballinger; Peer J. Oppenheimer
- Produced by: Peer J. Oppenheimer
- Starring: Burt Reynolds; Danielle Aubry; John Hoyt; Kieu Chinh; Vic Diaz; Marsh Thomson
- Cinematography: Richard Moore
- Edited by: Joseph Gluck; George Watters
- Music by: Paul Dunlap
- Production company: HeiRaMatt
- Distributed by: Allied Artists
- Release date: September 8, 1965
- Running time: 90 minutes
- Country: United States
- Languages: English; Vietnamese
- Budget: $70,000

Operation C.I.A. is a 1965 black-and-white spy film directed by Christian Nyby and starring Burt Reynolds and John Hoyt.

== Plot ==
CIA agent Stacey learns of a plan to assassinate the American ambassador to Vietnam, but is killed by a bomb before he can inform his superiors. Secret agent Mark Andrews is sent to Saigon to take his place. Andrews poses as a university professor as a cover while he attempts to prevent the assassination, which is expected to occur sometime within the next five days.

== Cast ==
- Burt Reynolds as CIA Agent Mark Andrews
- John Hoyt as Wells
- Kieu Chinh as Kim-Chinh
- Danielle Aubry as Denise
- Cyril Collick as Withers
- William Catching as Frank Decker
- Vic Diaz as Professor Yen
- Marsh Thomson as CIA Agent Stacey

== Production ==
The film was originally titled Last Message from Saigon with an announcement made in 1964 it would be filmed in Saigon, Hong Kong and Bangkok. Allied Artists filmed A Yank in Viet-Nam on actual South Vietnamese locations, but the security situation had deteriorated to such an extent that the safety of the filmmakers could not be guaranteed.

Filming began in Bangkok in January 1965.

Said Reynolds:

I got to fight a boa constrictor and he gave the best performance in the movie.

Producer Peer Oppenheimer later signed Reynolds to appear with Diane Cilento in Deadly Contest, to be filmed in Germany, but the project did not happen.

== In popular culture ==
Operation C.I.A. was referenced in the Archer episode "The Man from Jupiter", in which Reynolds makes a guest appearance as himself. Sterling Archer claims the film inspired him to become a secret agent, to which Reynolds replies "that film was just god-awful."

== See also ==
- List of American films of 1965
