= Hoa-Binh (film) =

- Film poster.
- Directed by: Raoul Coutard
- Written by: Raoul Coutard (adaption); Françoise Lorrain (novel)
- Produced by: Gilbert de Goldschmitt
- Starring: Phi Lân; Lê Quỳnh
- Cinematography: Georges van der Liron
- Edited by: Victoria Mercanton
- Music by: Michel Portal
- Distributed by: Warner Bros. Astral Films; Transvue Pictures
- Release date: 11 March 1970
- Running time: 105 minutes
- Countries: France; South Vietnam
- Languages: Vietnamese; French; English; Cantonese

The Bamboo Incident or Hoa-Binh (Vietnamese: Hòa Bình, Chinese: 和平) is a 1970 French film directed by Raoul Coutard and based on a novel La colonne de cendres by Françoise Lorrain.

== Plot ==
Two small Vietnamese boys grow up during the horrors and hardships of the Vietnam War era. Their father with the Vietcong and their mother in the hospital, two Vietnamese children try to survive on the streets of Saigon.

== Production ==
Filming took place about 1969 in Saigon and Bien Hoa.

=== Crew ===
- Production companies : Madeleine Films, Parc Film, Les Productions de la Guéville, C.A.P.A.C., Thiên Nga Films
- Production manager : Jacques Garcia
- Assistant director : Pierre Roubaud, Nguyễn Văn Nhân
- Sound mixer : Michel Laurent
- Composer : Billy Ellis (Fire night), Michel Portal (Le rideau rouge)
- Script supervisor : Monique Herran

=== Cast ===
- Lê Quỳnh as Nam - Papa (secret name Trí)
- Xuân Hà as Cao Thị Thu - Mama
- Phi Lân as Hùng - Son
- Huỳnh Cazenas as Xuân - Hùng's younger sister
- Marcel Lan Phương as Mrs. Năm - A cousin
- Bùi Thị Thanh as Trần Thị Hà - Xuân's foster mother
- Kiều Hạnh as Mrs. Ngoan - Vietnamese nurse
- Danièle Delorme as French nurse
- Phi Lân as VNACC commander
- Trần Văn Lịch as Vietcong political commissioner
- Anh Tuấn as Vietcong secret officer
- Võ Đình Phương as Bụi đời's male tycoon
- Minh Ngọc as Bụi đời's female tycoon
- Raoul Coutard as Angry French man

== Reception ==
The film was nominated for the Academy Award for Best Foreign Language Film. It was also entered into the 1970 Cannes Film Festival, where Coutard won the prize for Best First Work.

== See also ==
- The Faceless Lover
- From Saigon to Dien Bien Phu
- Indochine
- List of submissions to the 43rd Academy Awards for Best Foreign Language Film
- List of French submissions for the Academy Award for Best Foreign Language Film
