= From Saigon to Dien Bien Phu =

1967 film by Lê Mộng Hoàng

- Film poster
- Directed by: Lê Mộng Hoàng
- Screenplay by: Quốc Phong
- Produced by: Quốc Phong; Nguyễn Tăng Hồng
- Starring: Lê Quỳnh; Thẩm Thúy Hằng; Kiều Chinh; Đoàn Châu Mậu; Lily Chen Ching
- Cinematography: Châu Tùng
- Edited by: Tăng Thiên Tài
- Music by: Nghiêm Phú Phi
- Production companies: Mỹ Vân Films; Asia Motion Pictures Company
- Distributed by: Mỹ Vân Films
- Release date: 1967
- Running time: 100 minutes
- Countries: Republic of Vietnam; Republic of China; Hong Kong
- Languages: Vietnamese; Chinese(sub.); English(sub.); French(sub.)

From Saigon to Dien Bien Phu (Vietnamese: Từ Sài Gòn tới Điện Biên Phủ) All quiet on the Saigon front or Saigon out of war (Chinese: 西貢無戰事) is a 1967 Vietnamese 35mm Eastmancolor film directed by Lê Mộng Hoàng.

== Plot ==
The Joint Chiefs of Staff want to send some ARVNSF troops to North's Điện Biên Phủ for the Dien Bien Phu Operation. But all have been caught or killed by Chinese spies as Kiều Loan (Kiều Chinh), except Major Ngọc Minh (Lê Quỳnh).

== Production ==
The locations are Saigon, Hong Kong and Taipei in 1967.

=== Art ===
- Studio: Mỹ Vân Films, Asia Motion Pictures Company
- Print: National Centre for Cinema
- Scan: Spectra Films Studio
- Executive producer: Lưu Trạch Hưng
- Producer: Quốc Phong, Nguyễn Tăng Hồng
- Director: Lê Mộng Hoàng
- Writer: Quốc Phong
- Secretary: Lưu Trạch Quang
- Cinematography: Châu Tùng
- Editor: Tăng Thiên Tài
- Composer: Nghiêm Phú Phi

=== Cast ===
Vietnam

- Lê Quỳnh as Major Ngọc Minh
- Kiều Chinh as Kiều Loan
- Thẩm Thúy Hằng as Lệ Hằng
- Đoàn Châu Mậu as Colonel Lâm
- Hoàng Vĩnh Lộc
- Khả Năng
- Lê Khanh
- Ngọc Phu
- Trần Khánh
- Phương Dung

Taiwan

- Chen Yang as Manager Nhân
- Yu Tian
- Yen Chung

Hong Kong

- You Ming
- Cheng Hou
- Lily Chen Ching

and Air Vietnam staff members.

== See also ==
- The Quiet American
- Number Ten Blues
