= Phương Sơn =

Phương Sơn may refer to several places in Vietnam, including:

- Phương Sơn, Nha Trang, a ward of Nha Trang.
- Phương Sơn, Bắc Giang, a rural commune of Lục Nam District.
