= The Tayson Gallantry =

1991 Vietnamese film by Lê Hoàng Hoa

- Vietnamese: Tây-sơn hiệp-khách
- Hán-Nôm: 西山俠客
- Directed by: Lê Hoàng Hoa
- Screenplay by: Lê Hoàng Khải; Lê Hoàng Hoa
- Based on: Novel The Jade Lamp martial art by Lê Hoàng Khải
- Produced by: Mai Tân Long
- Starring: Lý Hùng; Diễm Hương; Mộng Vân; Ngọc Hiệp; Lê Tuấn Anh; Việt Trinh; Lê Cung Bắc
- Cinematography: Nguyễn Hòe
- Music by: Diệp Minh Tuyền
- Production company: Giaiphong Film Studio
- Distributed by: Giaiphong Film Studio; Vietnam National Institute of Film
- Release date: 1991
- Running time: 193 minutes
- Country: Vietnam
- Language: Vietnamese

The Tayson Gallantry (Vietnamese: Tây-sơn hiệp-khách, lit. 'Gallantry in the Tayson Era') is a 1991 Vietnamese 35mm wuxia film directed by Lê Hoàng Hoa in his art name Khôi Nguyên, adapted from Lê Hoàng Khải's 1990 novel The Jade Lamp martial art (玉盞神功).

== Plot ==
- Episode 1 : The Tayson Gallantry
- Episode 2 : The Jade Lamp Martial-art

== Production ==
Location is Bình Định in 1991.

=== Art ===
- Costume : Cố Đô Tailorshop

=== Cast ===
Episode 1

- Lý Hùng
- Diễm Hương
- Mộng Vân
- Hương Giang
- Ngọc Hiệp
- Lê Cung Bắc
- Trần Minh Dậu
- Phạm Đức Long
- Trần Công Tuấn
- Trần Thanh Trúc
- Ngọc Đặng
- Hoàng Phúc
- Thanh Mai
- Trần Quang Hiếu
- Tư Lê
- Monk Giác Huệ Viên
- Hoàng Triều
- Nguyễn Lượng
- Trần Công Thiện
- Bình Minh
- Lâm Thế Thành
- Huyền Linh
- Nhật Minh
- Văn Thành
- Thu Hương
- Thanh Thủy
- Trần Lộc
- Hoàng Ngân
- Mã Trung
- Văn Ngà
- Văn Mến
- Thành Lũy
- Anh Triều
- Lê Công Thế
- Thu Vân
- Sĩ Hùng
- Thanh Hùng
- Văn Thành
- Khôn Hải
- Thanh Tài
- Bá Lộc
- Thanh Linh
- Công Thành
- Lê Tuấn

Episode 2

- Lê Tuấn Anh
- Việt Trinh
- Mỹ Duyên
- Lý Minh
- Lê Ngân
- Trọng Hải
- Thạch Ngà
- Thạch Hùng
- Hắc Hổ
- Quang Hiếu
- Trần Long
- Mạc Can
- Lê Hải
- Nguyễn Khôi
- Tiến Dũng
- Lê Đạt
- Trung Nam
- Bảo Hạnh
- Thụy Giao
- Hải Diễm
- Văn Bình
- Ngọc Ái
- Đình Lan
- Thành Tài
- Công Duẩn
- Thái Hoàng
- Thanh Long
- Hữu Thuận
- Minh Thiên
- Xuân Bình
- Quang Thái
- Lê Cương
- Lê Dũng
