= Bà Năm Sadec =

Vietnamese actress and singer

Bà Năm Sa Đéc
- Born: Nguyễn Kim Chung; 1907; Tân Đông village, An Thanh Hạ canton, Châu Thành district, Sa Đéc province, Cochinchina (today is Phú Hựu commune, Đồng Tháp province, Vietnam)
- Died: 1988 (aged 80–81); Saigon, Vietnam
- Occupations: Actress, singer
- Years active: 1928-1988
- Spouses: Đặng Ngọc Chấn; Vương Hồng Sển (m. 1947–1988)
- Children: 2

Bà Năm Sa Đéc (1907–1988) was a Vietnamese actress and singer.

== Early life ==
Bà Năm Sa Đéc (Madame Fifth from Sa Đéc) was born in 1907 in Tân Đông village in An Thanh Hạ canton. This canton falls under Châu Thành district, Sa Đéc province, French Cochinchina (now Tân Khánh Đông commune, Sa Đéc city, Đồng Tháp province, Vietnam. Her name at birth was Nguyễn Kim Chung (Chinese: 阮金鐘). Her father was a theatre manager named Nguyễn Duy Tam (art name Cả Tam) who established Thiện Tiền Band in 1915. Hence, Kim Chung was contemporary as one famous actress's name at Mỹ Tho named by her father.

== Career ==
She entered the theatre in 1928 with the art name Năm Nhỏ ("the little fifth child"). She quickly became known for her role as the characters of Đào Tam Xuân (play Đào Tam Xuân), Lữ Phụng Tiên (Phụng Nghi House), Hồ Nguyệt Cô (Tiết Giao usurps the gem) and soon became rated as one of the theatre's "Five Gems", along with Năm Đồ, Cao Long Ngà, Ba Út and the two actresses Năm Nhỏ. She was later renamed as Năm Sa Đéc while Cochinchinese newspapers called her Bà Năm Sa Đéc (Madame Fifth from Sa Đéc).

=== Theatre ===
- Đào Tam Xuân in Đào Tam Xuân
- Lữ Phụng Tiên, Đổng Trác in Phụng Nghi House
- Hồ Nguyệt Cô in Tiết Giao usurps the gem
- A madwoman in Ngũ biến báo phu cừu
- Địch Thanh
- Mrs "Judge" Lợi in Breaking the ties

=== Film ===
- The mother in The Purple Horizon (1971)
- The mother in Tears of Stone (1971)
- The Ghost of Hui Family (1973)
- Mrs Hai Lành in Alluvium (1982)
- Cho đến bao giờ (1983)
- Con thú tật nguyền (1984)
- Mùa nước nổi (1985)
- In the Quiet Edge Where Birds Sing (1986)
