= Ngọc Lan =

Vietnamese singer (1956–2001)

- Born: Lê Thanh Lan; December 28, 1956; Nha Trang, Khánh Hòa province, South Vietnam
- Died: March 6, 2001 (aged 44); Huntington Beach, California, United States
- Burial place: Fairview Memorial Park, Fountain Valley, California, United States
- Occupation: Singer

Maria Lê Thanh Lan, stage name Ngọc Lan "Jade Orchid" (28 December 1956 - 6 March 2001), was a Vietnamese-American singer-lyricist known for covering nostalgic French-language love songs. Among her biggest hits included covers of Mon amie la rose of Françoise Hardy, Johnny, Johnny of Jeanne Mas, Joe le taxi of Vanessa Paradis, Tombe la neige of Salvatore Adamo, Pour en arriver-là and Mourir sur scène of Dalida and Poupée de cire, poupée de son of France Gall.

Ngoc Lan is considered one of the most successful and famous singers in the Vietnamese music scene after 1975.

== Early life ==
Ngoc Lan was born Le Thanh Lan (also known as St. Maria Maria Le Thanh Lan) on 28 December 1956 in Nha Trang. Ngoc Lan is the fifth of eight people in a well-off family. Her father, Le Duc Mau served in the South Vietnamese Armed Forces. While in Vietnam, she listened to Le Hoang Long's music, studied music and performed on occasions in Nha Trang. She studied at Lý Thường Kiệt School (now is Lý Thường Kiệt High School) in Hóc Môn district, Gia Định, a suburb of Saigon.

== Career ==
=== Starting a business ===
In 1980, Ngoc Lan came to the United States and settled in Minnesota. Two years later, Ngoc Lan started her singing career in California. She chose the name Ngoc Lan because her real name, Thanh Lan, coincided with that of the famous singer Thanh Lan. With the introduction of singer Duy Quang, she sang at a number of cafes and concerts.

=== At the top of her career ===
She collaborated with May Productions to perform Ngoc Lan 1: As you love him in 1989 and Ngoc Lan 2 The sun over the summer in 1991 by director Dang Tran Thuc.

Ngoc Lan's success dates back to the years when overseas music was "thirsty" for singers and new releases. The presence of girlfriends music style songs of this period are very popular songs such as Khanh Ha, Tuan Ngoc, and Duy Quang.

In the 1980s and early 1990s, she accepted the invitation of the Asian Center to participate in the 15th Love Link CD, along with two other well-loved songs at that time.

At the same time, she was also invited to tour continuously, and has become the Top Female singer of the four-year festival since 1987 in the music community of the Vietnamese community across the five continents. Chieu Duong (Australia) posted on 14 September 1990 as follows:

Over 3 nights of performances in Sydney and Melbourne, two of Australia's largest cities, singer Ngoc Lan was a huge success. Hall (Sydney) In Melbourne, more than 1500 spectators had to stand to see Ngoc Lan's performance. This year, since the music show in Australia, this is the largest show for singer Ngoc Lan.

== Death ==
After a long period of multiple sclerosis and limited vision, Ngoc Lan died on 6 March 2001 at Vencor Hospital, Huntington Beach, Southern California.
