= Jack Lewis (screenwriter) =

American screenwriter and novelist

Lieutenant Colonel Jack Lewis or C. Jack Lewis USMC retired (November 13, 1924 – May 24, 2009), was a former Marine, screenwriter, and author of 12 books and an estimated 6,000 magazine articles and short stories. He was the co-founder and editor of Gun World magazine and continued contributing articles to that publication until the time of his death. Lewis wrote under the name C. Jack Lewis due to four other writers with the name of Jack Lewis.

== Biography ==
Lewis was born in Iowa in 1924. He sold his first short story, "The Cherokee Kid's Last Stand", at the age of 14 for $5.00, which Lewis thought was better money than a field hand's wage, which was then a dollar a day. Buoyed by his success, Lewis submitted an unsolicited Andy Hardy screenplay that was rejected by MGM. He did not sell any more stories until he was 22.

Lewis recalled being lost as a child in a Department Store and being found by two Marines in dress blues. He enlisted in the United States Marine Corps at 18 years of age in World War II and was commissioned a second lieutenant in 1945.

After the war, Lewis attended the University of Iowa, where he earned a bachelor's degree in journalism. After obtaining the degree, Lewis reentered the Marine Corps through the Marine Corps Reserve. He worked on a Marine training film, then was assigned as a technical advisor to the film Sands of Iwo Jima, where Lewis said he advised the cast how to lace up their leggings.

== Screenwriting ==
Lewis began his screenwriting career in 1950 with several Westerns, including the Lash LaRue feature King of the Bullwhip for Ron Ormond.

With the start of the Korean War, Lewis returned to active duty for six years in the Corps. He served as a combat correspondent and photographer, where he earned the Bronze Star during his second Korean tour, filming Marine aircraft bombing enemy positions. During the Korean War, Lewis had his first experience with the M1 carbine. He fired eight rounds at an enemy soldier before a Marine with a Thompson submachine gun felled the soldier. Lewis discovered that six of his rounds had hit his target with no effect; Lewis began to carry a Thompson.

Lewis submitted over two dozen magazine articles to Marine Corps Headquarters about the exploits of the Marines in Korea. Headquarters sent them back, saying that they sounded too much like Marine propaganda; Lewis then sent them to his civilian literary agent who had them published, with a payment for Lewis of $200 each. Lewis sent copies of the published articles to the Headquarters person who had rejected them.

After Korea, Captain Lewis served as a company commander in the 4th Marines at Camp Pendleton, then was transferred to Naval Air Station Kaneohe Bay as a Public Information Officer. During his Hawaiian tour, Lewis was assigned as one of the technical advisors to John Ford's Mister Roberts. When no one could find a stunt performer to drive a motorcycle off a pier, Lewis did the job himself. Lewis later appeared in Ford's film Sergeant Rutledge.

In 1960, Lewis wrote the screenplay for Poverty Row filmmaker Edgar G. Ulmer's The Amazing Transparent Man. The only science fiction script by Lewis ever filmed, this poorly received American International Pictures release was later lampooned in an episode of Mystery Science Theater 3000.

== Journalism ==
Though Lewis's commanding officer offered to get him a regular commission, Lewis wished to become a full-time writer and left the Corps. In addition to his screenplays, film work, and story writing, Lewis became an editor of a magazine and, after three years of observing the process, teamed up with that magazine's art director Dean Grennell to publish Gun World magazine in 1959. Lewis authored the monthly knife column in Gun World until his death.

Lewis's writing on the capabilities of various weapons as well as his photos of "exotic" (military and law enforcement) weapons led several major firearms manufacturers to not advertise in Gun World. Lewis told the then Commandant of the Marine Corps Paul X. Kelley that the M16 rifle's effect was that "The United States used to be known as a Nation of Riflemen; now we've become a Nation of Sprayers". Lewis's continued contact with the Marine Corps led him to:

- write the screenplay to Marshall Thompson's film A Yank in Viet-Nam that was filmed on location in South Vietnam in 1963.
- have his first novel, Tell it to the Marines, published in 1966.
- return to active duty in the Corps in 1969 with III Marine Amphibious Corps in the Vietnam War. Lewis earned his second and third Air Medals during his Vietnam tour. Lewis retired from the Marine Corps Reserve one day before his 60th birthday, November 12, 1984.

In addition to nonfiction, Lewis wrote "Charlie Cougar" mysteries and Westerns as well as White Horse, Black Hat – A Quarter Century on Hollywood's Poverty Row, his memoirs of Hollywood.

Jack Lewis died on May 24, 2009, after a short bout with cancer.

== Quote ==
"I've been told that I'm not smart enough to realize I can't tilt windmills and win, but tenacity has a life and a way all its own, I've found. If one approach to a problem doesn't work, figure out how to go around it"
