= The Quiet American =

1955 novel by Graham Greene

The Quiet American (UK First Edition cover)
- Author: Graham Greene
- Cover artist: "BGS"
- Language: English
- Genre: Novel
- Publisher: William Heinemann London
- Publication date: December 1955
- Publication place: United Kingdom
- Media type: Print
- Pages: 247
- ISBN: 9780679600145
- Dewey Decimal: 823.914
- LC Class: PR6013.R44
- Preceded by: The End of the Affair (1951)
- Followed by: Loser Takes All (1955)

The Quiet American is a 1955 novel by English author Graham Greene.

Narrated in the first person by journalist Thomas Fowler, the novel depicts the breakdown of French colonialism in Vietnam and early American involvement in the First Indochina War. A subplot concerns a love triangle between Fowler, an American named Alden Pyle, and Phuong, a young Vietnamese woman.

The novel implicitly questions the foundations of growing American involvement in Vietnam in the 1950s, exploring the subject through links among its three main characters: Fowler, Pyle and Phuong. The novel has received much attention due to its prediction of the outcome of the Vietnam War and subsequent American foreign policy since the 1950s. Greene portrays Pyle as so blinded by American exceptionalism that he cannot see the calamities he brings upon the Vietnamese. The book uses Greene's experiences as a war correspondent for The Times and Le Figaro in French Indochina 1951–1954. He was apparently inspired to write The Quiet American during October 1951 while driving back to Saigon from Bến Tre province, accompanied by an American aid worker who lectured him about finding a "third force in Vietnam".

It was twice adapted for film, in 1958 and in 2002.

== Plot ==
Thomas Fowler is a British journalist in his fifties who has covered the French war in Vietnam for more than two years. He meets a young American idealist named Alden Pyle, a Central Intelligence Agency (CIA) agent working undercover. Pyle lives his life and forms his opinions based on foreign policy books written by York Harding with no real experience in Southeast Asian matters. Harding's theory is that neither communism nor colonialism is proper in foreign lands like Vietnam, but rather a "Third Force"—usually a combination of traditions—works best. When they first meet, the earnest Pyle asks Fowler to help him understand more about the country, but the older man's cynical realism does not sink in. Pyle is certain that American power can put the Third Force in charge, but he knows little about Indochina and recasts it into theoretical categories.

Fowler has a live-in lover, Phuong, who is only 20 years old and was previously a dancer at The Arc-en-Ciel (Rainbow) on Jaccareo Road, in Chợ Lớn. Her sister's intent is to arrange a marriage for Phuong that will benefit herself and her family. The sister disapproves of their relationship because Fowler is already married and an atheist. At a dinner with Fowler and Phuong, Pyle meets her sister, who immediately starts questioning Pyle about his viability for marriage with Phuong.

Fowler goes to Phát Diệm to witness a battle. Pyle travels there to tell him that he has been in love with Phuong since the first night he saw her, and that he wants to marry her. They make a toast to nothing and Pyle leaves the next day. Fowler gets a letter from Pyle thanking him for being so nice. The letter annoys Fowler because of Pyle's arrogant confidence that Phuong will leave Fowler to marry him. Meanwhile, Fowler's editor wants him to return to England.

Pyle visits Fowler's residence and they ask Phuong to choose between them. She chooses Fowler, unaware that his transfer is pending. Fowler writes to his wife to ask for a divorce, in front of Phuong.

Fowler and Pyle meet again in a war zone. They end up in a guard tower where they discuss topics ranging from sexual experiences to religion. Their presence endangers the local guards by attracting an attack by the Viet Minh. Pyle saves Fowler's life as they escape. Fowler returns to Saigon, where he lies to Phuong that his wife will divorce him. Pyle exposes the lie and Phuong must again choose between him and Fowler. Phuong considers her own interests realistically and without sentiment. She moves in with Pyle. Fowler writes to his editor, who decides that he can stay in Indo-China for another year. Fowler goes into the midst of the battlefield to witness events.

When Fowler returns to Saigon, he goes to Pyle's office to confront him, but Pyle is out. Pyle comes over later for drinks and they talk about his pending marriage to Phuong. Later that week, a bicycle bomb is detonated and many innocent civilians are killed. Fowler realizes that Pyle was involved. Pyle had allied himself with General Thé, a renegade commander he was grooming to lead the "Third Force" described in Harding's book. Pyle thus brings disaster upon innocents, all the while certain he is bringing a third way to Vietnam. Fowler is emotionally conflicted about this discovery, but ultimately decides to aid in assassinating Pyle. Although the police suspect that Fowler is involved, they cannot prove it. Phuong goes back to Fowler as if nothing had ever happened. In the last chapter, Fowler receives a telegram from his wife in which she states that she has changed her mind and will begin divorce proceedings. The novel ends with Fowler thinking about his first meeting with, and the death of, Pyle.

== Major characters ==
Thomas Fowler is a British journalist in his fifties who has been covering the French war in Vietnam for more than two years. He has become a very jaded and cynical man. He meets Alden Pyle and finds him naïve. Throughout the book Fowler is often caught in lies and sometimes there may be speculation that he is lying to himself. Fowler's relationship with Vietnamese woman Phuong often intensifies the conflict of the story, especially between Fowler and Pyle.

Alden Pyle is the "quiet American" of the title. A CIA agent working undercover, Pyle is thoughtful, soft-spoken, intellectual, serious, and idealistic. He comes from a privileged East Coast background. His father is a renowned professor of underwater erosion whose picture has appeared on the cover of Time magazine; his mother is well respected in their community. Pyle is a brilliant graduate of Harvard University. He has studied theories of government and society, and is particularly devoted to a scholar named York Harding. Harding's theory is that neither Communism nor colonialism is the answer in foreign lands like Vietnam, but rather a "Third Force", usually a combination of traditions, works best. Pyle has read Harding's numerous books many times and has adopted Harding's thinking as his own. Pyle also strives to be a member of this "Third Force". US military counter-insurgency expert Edward Lansdale, who was stationed in Vietnam 1953–1957, is sometimes cited as a model for Pyle's character. In fact Greene did not meet Lansdale until after completing much of the novel. According to Greene, the inspiration for the character of Pyle was Leo Hochstetter, an American serving as public affairs director for the Economic Aid Mission in Indochina who was assumed by the French to "belong to the CIA", and lectured him on the "long drive back to Saigon on the necessity of finding a 'third force in Vietnam.'”

Phuong, Fowler's lover at the beginning of the novel, is a beautiful young Vietnamese woman who stays with him for security and protection, and leaves him for the same reason. She is considered by Fowler as a lover to be taken for granted and by Pyle as someone to be protected. Pyle's desire for Phuong was largely interpreted by critics to parallel his desire for a non-Americanised South Vietnam. Her character is never fully developed or revealed. She is never able to show her emotions, as her older sister makes decisions for her. She is named after, but not based on, a Vietnamese friend of Greene's.

Vigot, a French inspector at the Sûreté, investigates Pyle's death. He is a man anguished between doing his duty (pursuing Pyle's death and questioning Fowler) and doing what is best for the country (letting the matter be unsolved). He and Fowler are oddly akin in some ways, both faintly cynical and weary of the world; hence their discussion of Blaise Pascal. But they are divided by the differences of their faith: Vigot is a Roman Catholic and Fowler an atheist.

== Literary significance and reception ==
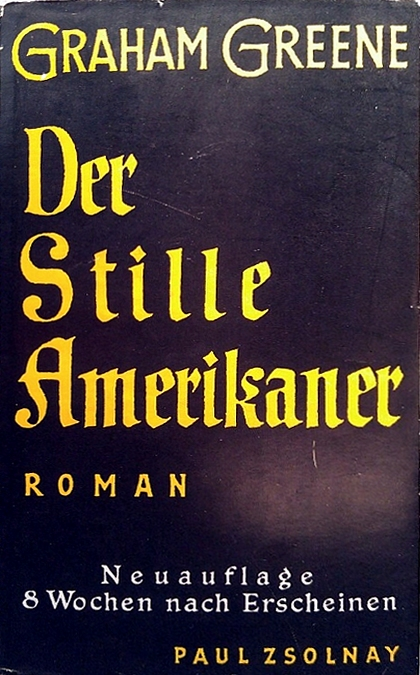
Cover of the second German edition from 1956, which according to the cover inscription was on sale only 8 weeks after the first edition, implicitly telling that the first had already been sold out

The novel was popular in Britain, and over the years achieved notable status. It was adapted to film in 1958, and again in 2002 by Miramax. The 2002 film featured Michael Caine and Brendan Fraser, and earned Caine a nomination for the Academy Award for Best Actor.

When the novel was first published in the United States in 1956, however, it was widely condemned there as anti-American. A New Yorker critique said "anybody who read the book would wonder whether the State Department was engaged in the business of murdering ... civilians."

According to critic Philip Stratford, "American readers were incensed, perhaps not so much because of the biased portrait of obtuse and destructive American innocence and idealism in Alden Pyle, but because in this case it was drawn with such acid pleasure by a middle-class English snob like Thomas Fowler whom they were all too ready to identify with Greene himself".

The title of a 1958 book, The Ugly American, was a play on Greene's title; however, the authors of that book, Eugene Burdick and William Lederer, had arguably thoroughly misunderstood Greene's novel, since their book argued that the American diplomatic corps needed to be more modern, technically proficient, and friendly in assisting Third World countries—some of the exact opinions that Greene had depicted as blinding Alden Pyle.

French journalist Jean-Claude Pomonti's 2006 book about the South Vietnamese correspondent and Viet Cong spy Phạm Xuân Ẩn was titled Un Vietnamien bien tranquille (The Quiet Vietnamese), which was widely understood as a play on the title of Greene's book.

Scott Anderson's 2021 book, The Quiet Americans: Four CIA Spies at the Dawn of the Cold War—A Tragedy in Three Parts, describes the activities of CIA operators during the Cold War. This book's title too is a play on the title of Greene's book, although its spy craft-related themes are different.

On 5 November 2019, BBC News included The Quiet American on its list of the 100 most inspiring novels.

== Adaptations ==
=== Film ===
The novel has been adapted to film twice, in 1958 and 2002. The 1958 Hollywood film inverted the theme of the novel, turning it into an anti-communist story instead of a cautionary tale about American interventionism. The plot of the 2002 film version, in contrast, was true to the book. It was test-screened to positive audience reactions on 10 September 2001. However, the 9/11 attacks took place the next day, and audience ratings declined with each subsequent screening. Reacting to criticism of its "unpatriotic" message, Miramax shelved the film for a year.

- The Quiet American (1958)
- The Quiet American (2002)

=== Radio ===
- BBC Radio 4, Classic Serial, dramatised in 3 × 60' episodes by Gregory Evans (1990).

=== Documentary ===
- ABC Australia documentary Graham Greene: "The Quiet American"

== See also ==
- Person Dignity Theory
