= Tran Bach Dang =

Trần Bạch Đằng
- Born: 1926; Rạch Giá, Kiên Giang Province, Vietnam
- Died: April 16, 2007; Ho Chi Minh City, Vietnam
- Occupation(s): Fireman, journalist and politician

Trần Bạch Đằng (born Truong Gia Trieu) (1926 – April 16, 2007) was a key figure in planning the 1968 Tet Offensive during the Vietnam War, and was the leader of Communist forces in Saigon, the South Vietnamese capital, during that offensive. He was the leading Communist political officer in Saigon and a member of the National Liberation Front Central Committee.

Đằng is the author of the novel Ván bài lật ngửa, which was about an intelligence figure in the Vietnam War - Colonel Phạm Ngọc Thảo, under the pen name Nguyễn Trương Thiên Lý.

== Biography ==
His real name is Trương Gia Triều. He was born on July 15, 1926, in Hòa Thuận commune, Giồng Riềng District, Rạch Giá (now Kiên Giang province). He was one of the early students of Petrus Trương Vĩnh Ký High School (now Lê Hồng Phong High School For The Gifted).

Đằng started participating in military activities at the age of 17. In 1946, he was assigned to be in charge of the "Chống Xâm Lăng" newspaper of the Saigon Party Committee. In 1951, he worked as the editor-in-chief of the "Nhân dân Miền Nam" newspaper.

In 1976, he became a member of the Vietnam Writers Association.

Đằng died from lung cancer at the age of 81 - on April 16, 2007, at Cho Ray Hospital.
