= Kieu Chinh =

Vietnamese-American actress (born 1937)

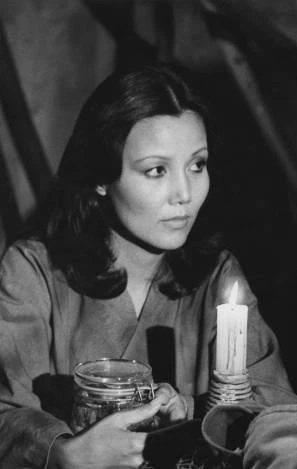
- Chinh in M*A*S*H (1977)
- Born: Nguyễn Thị Kiều Chinh; September 3, 1937 (age 89); Hanoi, Tonkin, French Indochina
- Occupations: Actress; producer
- Years active: 1957–present
- Spouse: Nguyễn Năng Tế (m. 1955; div. 1980)
- Children: 3
- Honours: Damehood
- Website: Kieu Chinh

Kieu Chinh (Vietnamese: Kiều Chinh; born September 3, 1937) is a Vietnamese-American actress, producer, humanitarian, lecturer and philanthropist.

== Early life ==
Dame Kieu Chinh was born on September 3, 1937, in Hanoi as Nguyễn Thị Kiều Chinh.

During World War II, her mother and her newly born brother were killed when their hospital was struck by an Allied bombing raid targeting Japanese troops in Hanoi during the Japanese occupation of French Indochina, when Chinh was at the age of six. Even so, her father was a government official so the family was quite wealthy.

Following the end of World War II and the subsequent division of Vietnam into Communist and National regimes after the Geneva Conference, Chinh's older brother ran away from home to join the Resistance Forces. Her father urged her to board an aircraft and travel to the South, while he remained in the North to search for her older brother, promising to reunite with her in Saigon. Following her arrival in South Vietnam, however, she never saw her father again. Following her return to Vietnam in 1995 to meet her older brother, Chinh learned that her father was imprisoned in a communist re-education camp for more than six years and, after his release, died homeless and destitute.

Her father's friend adopted the young Kieu Chinh. Monsieur Nguyễn Đại Độ was worried that his son would stay in America after the airborne course, so he decided to send a telegram to the North. He asked permission from Chinh's father to pair her with Sub-lieutenant Nguyễn Năng Tế - the son of Mr. Độ - in 1956. After that, she only went to church on weekends because her husband's family were Buddhists. This had a great impact on her later career.

== Career ==
=== 1955–1975 ===
One day in 1956 Kieu Chinh was walking near the Hôtel Continental, when a young man approached her and asked her to go to a roadside café to meet someone. Then he introduced that person as a famous director named Joseph L. Mankiewicz. Mankiewicz said that Chinh suited a fictional role he was going to film in Saigon. He suggested she take the script of The Quiet American. However, after pressure from her family, who were reluctant to allow her, Kieu Chinh had to decline that opportunity. Within a week, Saigon widespread press headline news, including portrait photos of "Vietnamese unknown girl rejects Hollywood's famous director". So politician Bùi Diễm invited Kieu Chinh to play the lead role in the first project of his studio - Tân Việt Films. Her character, which her family agreed to, was a Buddhist nun. So Chinh began her acting career in South Vietnam, starting with a starring role in The Bells of Thiên Mụ Temple (Hồi Chuông Thiên Mụ) (1957).

In her career spanning over sixty years from 1957 to the present, Chinh has received many accolades including an Emmy Award in 1996. Her film roles included Operation C.I.A. (1965) and The Joy Luck Club (1993). She is also a president, co-founder, and co-chair of the Vietnam Children's Fund.

In the 1960s, in addition to Vietnamese films, she also appeared in several American productions including A Yank in Viet-Nam (1964) and Operation C.I.A. (1965), the latter opposite Burt Reynolds. Kieu Chinh also produced a war epic Faceless Lover (or Warrior, Who Are You) (1971), which later would be remastered and shown in the U.S. at the 2003 Vietnamese International Film Festival.

About 1970, filmmaker Hoàng Vĩnh Lộc told his best friend Kieu Chinh that: "Chinh, we made so many nonsense ones that I got too bored. I have just written this scenario. Read ! So we can now do it, alright ?". By Hoàng Vĩnh Lộc's idea, a feature of Faceless Lover that related so much to the military forces, that every Saigon studio had declined. They feared the system of censorship, not to mention that South Vietnamese contemporary audiences almost hated war films. "We should try doing it !" — said Kieu Chinh. After deliberation, they decided to immediately establish a small studio to realize their ideas.

Permission for the Giao Chỉ Films Studio's war film was initially rejected because the studio was privately owned, so general director Kieu Chinh asked for permission from the Ministry of Information, Ministry of National Defence, and especially the headquarter of the Republic of Vietnam Military Forces. So during the summer of 1971, the project started filming. Later that year, the film was first shown at the Rex Movie Theatre which was the biggest theatre in South Vietnam. Later, it was shown at the Asian Film Festival in Taipei. However, its subsequent public release was delayed for almost a year.

After its completion, the release of Faceless Lover was blocked for more than a year, because the censorship agency viewed it as an anti-war film which could discourage youths from joining the army. In a 1973 screening event at the National Centre for Cinema by Minister of Open-Arms Hoàng Đức Nhã with 100% audiences as the Cabinet's members. Film director Hoàng Vĩnh Lộc and producer Kieu Chinh was also invited. Afterwards, Mr. Nhã spoke with other ministers: "What are your opinions ? Should it be forbidden or allowed to be released?". One exclaimed that: "C'est une sale guerre !", so "Minister, please tell me now : What war is not a «sale guerre» ?" — said Kieu Chinh. ("Sale Guerre" is French for Dirty War.) At last, Minister Hoàng Đức Nhã suggested a vote. So the result was 19 Yes and only 1 No.

In Chinh's memoir, Faceless Lover was allowed to be shown again in 1973. It had the honor of being the first Vietnamese film shown at the Rex Movie Theatre. Rex specialised in showing US blockbusters such as Doctor Zhivago or Romeo and Juliet. Kieu Chinh must "insisted" Madame Ưng Thi who was an owner of Rex Theatre. She was reluctant and said: "This can not show Vietnamese ones. I am afraid of small audiences and a loss.". Eventually, Madame Ưng Thi agreed to a contract of a week. "If from the third day, the theatre has such still many empty seats then I will cancel !" — said Madame Ưng Thi. However, director Hoàng Vĩnh Lộc immediately replied: "Just do it, then will see !".

Giao Chỉ Films decided to initially offer free entrance for military men and their families. So the screening event was a great success with full houses. The entire crew all went to Pink Night tearoom to celebrate. Guests included: Trịnh Công Sơn, Cung Tiến, Văn Quang... then back again to Kieu Chinh's home at Lữ Gia housing overnight. After the initial contract week, Faceless Lover was deemed a success, so actor Minh Trường Sơn had to collect a large payment. Madame Ưng Thi immediately agreed to a second week's screening with producer Kieu Chinh. The film continued expanding to Đại-Nam Cinema and the network of Saigonese theatres.

Chinh's Faceless Lover was the first war movie to dominate newspaper headlines in South Vietnam. The total cost was 15 million VN$ (1US$ = 277,75VN$ in 1970), but the first month's profit was more than 48 million VN$. This allowed director Hoàng Vĩnh Lộc to make two new films which were Male and Female (Note: Based on Khái Hưng's novel) and In a Student's Embrace. (Note: Based on Nguyễn Thị Hoàng's novel) Also, Hoàng Vĩnh Lộc planned a post-war future for Vietnam. He wanted to realize a film project The Cartus Plant which was based on the Bible. Although the event of April 30 made everything vanish into smoke. The original film tape was lost after the National Day of Hatred, but fortunately, a copy existed. Actress Kieu Chinh reissued it in California from the 1980s to the present.

The film won the Best War Film & Best Theme (for Hoàng Vĩnh Lộc) and Best Leading Actress (for Kieu Chinh) at the Asian International Film Festival XVI in Taipei on June 6, 1971. From then until now, it has been given notable mention in all lists of Vietnamese films, though was still forbidden to appear on television channels.

In April 1975, while Chinh was on a film set in Singapore, she realised that North Vietnam was about to overrun Saigon. She returned to South Vietnam, and then on to Singapore using her diplomatic passport. When the government of South Vietnam fell, she was deported from Singapore because her diplomatic passport was no longer valid. She was refused entry to France, Britain and the US. Eventually, she was admitted to Canada. She needed to get a job immediately and ended up working on a chicken farm. She tried to contact previous acquaintances in the acting world including Glenn Ford and Burt Reynolds, but both were "unavailable" to help. Eventually, she contacted Tippi Hedren who arranged an air ticket and a US visa for her and invited her to her home. William Holden also was supportive once he had found out about Chinh's plight. Kieu Chinh resumed her acting career in the US, her first part being in a 1977 episode of M*A*S*H "In Love and War", written by Alan Alda and loosely based on her life story.

=== 1976 to present ===
Chinh lived in Canada with her children for several years. After divorcing her husband, Chinh decided to go to California to settle there. She founded the Giao Chỉ Film Production company to promote Vietnamese culture and arts. Chinh invited many old friends who are known authors and artists for collaborations. At the same time, she re-released two films which she still kept after the sorrowful events of April 30: Faceless Lover and Love Storm.

Chinh subsequently acted in feature films as well as TV movies, including The Children of An Lac (1980), Hamburger Hill (1987), Riot (1997), Catfish in Black Bean Sauce (1999), Face (2002), Journey From The Fall (2005), 21 (2008). She also became an MC with Giao Chi Television from Los Angeles.

From 1989 to 1991, she had a recurring role as Triệu Âu on the ABC Vietnam War drama series China Beach.

In her best-known role, she starred as Suyuan, one of the women in Wayne Wang’s film The Joy Luck Club in 1993. In 2005, Chinh starred in Journey from the Fall, a film tracing a Vietnamese family through the aftermath of the fall of Saigon, the re-education camps, the boat people experience, and the initial difficulties of settling in the U.S.

In 2016, she returned to Vietnam to inaugurate the 50th school which was built in Hanoi under the Vietnam Children's Fund. In 2021, she released her memoir Kieu Chinh An Artist in Exile.

== Personal life ==
During the peak period of boat people fleeing the border since 1980, Chinh did charity work for the United States Citizenship and Immigration Services. She called for the attention of the US government to help Vietnamese boat people floating at sea or trapped in refugee camps. In 1993, together with journalist Terry A. Anderson, Kieu Chinh co-founded the Vietnam Children's Fund, a non-profit organization that has built a network of elementary schools in Vietnam as living memorials to remember the families and children lost in that country’s long wars. The first school was located in Quảng Trị and named after one of the association's founders, Lewis Burwell Puller Jr., in memory of the American veteran who died nearly a year earlier. By 2016, the organization had built its 50th school in Quảng Nam province.

The family is Buddhist, but Kieu Chinh attended a Christian school when she was young. When Chinh married, she became a Buddhist. Both religions play an important role in her life. In 2014, she met the 14th Dalai Lama in Dharamsala, India, and in 2016 at the Vietnamese Buddhist temple in Westminster, California. Kieu Chinh and her husband Nang Te Nguyen (Nguyễn Năng Tế) had three children. The couple divorced in 1980.

== Filmography ==
=== Film ===
| Year | Title | Role | Notes | Ref. |
|---|---|---|---|---|
| 1957 | The Bells of Thien Mu Temple | Bhikkhunī Nhu Ngoc | Original Title: Hồi Chuông Thiên Mụ | |
| 1962 | Mưa Rừng | | | |
| 1964 | A Yank in Viet-Nam | Herself | | |
| 1965 | Operation C.I.A. | Kim Chinh | | |
| 1967 | From Saigon to Dien Bien Phu | Kieu Loan | Original Title: Từ Sài Gòn tới Điện Biên Phủ | |
| 1970 | The Evil Within | Kamar Souria | | |
| 1971 | Warrior, Who Are You | My Lan | Original Title: Người Tình Không Chân Dung | |
| 1972 | Bão Tình | Thuy | | |
| 1973 | Chiếc Bóng Bên Đường | Loan | | |
| 1974 | Hè Muộn | | | |
| 1978 | The Lucifer Complex | Major Chinn Lee | | |
| 1987 | Hamburger Hill | Mama San | | |
| 1989 | Gleaming the Cube | Madame Trac | | |
| 1989 | Welcome Home | Leang | | |
| 1990 | Vietnam, Texas | Mallan | | |
| 1993 | The Joy Luck Club | Suyuan Woo | | |
| 1997 | Riot | Mrs. Lee | | |
| 1998 | City of Angels | Asian Woman | | |
| 1999 | Catfish in Black Bean Sauce | Thanh | | |
| 2000 | What's Cooking? | Grandma Nguyen | | |
| 2001 | Green Dragon | Kieu | | |
| 2002 | Face | Mrs. Liu | | |
| 2006 | Journey from the Fall | Grandmother | | |
| 2008 | 21 | Chinese Woman | | |
| 2009 | 21 and a Wake-Up | Mamason | | |
| 2011 | Pearls of the Far East | Kieu | Original Title: Ngọc Viễn Đông | |
| 2014 | Hollow | Linh | Original Title: Đoạt Hồn | |
| 2019 | In Full Bloom | Cecile | Short film | |
| 2025 | Control Freak | Thuy | | |
| 2026 | Chrysalis | Ba Noi | | |

=== Television ===
| Year | Title | Role | Notes | Ref. |
|---|---|---|---|---|
| 1976 | Police Woman | Mai Fuller | Season 2, Episode 16: "The Melting Point of Ice" | |
| 1976 | Switch | Mai Tuc | Season 2, Episode 13: "The 100,000 Ruble Rumble" | |
| 1977 | Cover Girls | Chinese Model | Television film | |
| 1977 | M*A*S*H | Kyung Soon | Season 6, Episode 8: "In Love and War" | |
| 1978 | My Husband is Missing | Lu An | Television film | |
| 1979 | Roots: The Next Generations | U.N. Receptionist | Episode: Part VII (1960–1967) | |
| 1980 | The Children of An Lac | Thuy | Television film | |
| 1981 | Fantasy Island | Oriental Woman | Season 4, Episode 12: "The Heroine/The Warrior" | |
| 1981 | Fly Away Home | Anh | Television film | |
| 1982 | Lou Grant | Anh | Season 5, Episode 13: "Immigrants" | |
| 1982 | The Letter | Chinese Woman | Television film | |
| 1983 | Cocaine: One Man's Seduction | Mrs. Marchais | Television film | |
| 1983 | Dynasty | Sister Agnes | Season 3, 5 Episodes | |
| 1984 | Matt Houston | Mrs. Li | Season 3, Episode 6: "Return to Nam: Part 1" | |
| 1985 | Cagney & Lacey | My Linh | Season 5, Episode 6: "The Clinic" | |
| 1986 | The Disney Sunday Movie | Phoen Yann | Season 30, Episode 4: "The Girl Who Spelled Freedom" | |
| 1986 | Hotel | Mrs. Thanh | Season 3, Episode 17: "Heroes" | |
| 1986 | The Return of Mickey Spillane's Mike Hammer | Sai Luhn | Television film | |
| 1985–1988 | Santa Barbara | Farmer's Wife | Season 1, 6 Episodes | |
| 1988 | Simon & Simon | Mrs. Yamanoha | Season 8, "Zen and the Art of the Split Finger Fastball" | |
| 1990 | The Girl Who Came Between Them | Thuy | Television film | |
| 1990 | Last Flight Out | Viet Cong's member | Television film | |
| 1989–1991 | China Beach | Trieu Au/Sister | Season 3–4, 7 Episodes | |
| 1993 | Message from Nam | Sister Thieu | Television film | |
| 1996 | Cybill | Herbalist | Season 2, Episode 21: "When You're Hot, You're Hot" | |
| 1997 | Promised Land | Nurse | Season 1, Episode 17: "Amazing Grace: Part 2" | |
| 1997 | Nash Bridges | Madame Nu | Season 3, Episode 8: "Revelations" | |
| 1997–1999 | Touched by an Angel | Lang/Mrs. Kim | Season 3–5, 2 Episodes | |
| 1999 | Martial Law | Lin Sung Yuan | Season 1, Episode 22: "End Game: Part 2" | |
| 2000 | Chicago Hope | Mrs. Mai Ying Wang | Season 6, Episode 10: "Hanlon's Choice" | |
| 2001 | The Beast | Penelope | Episode 1: "The Price" | |
| 2003 | Tempted | Kehau | Television film | |
| 2012 | Awake | Mrs. Do | Episode 9: "Game Day" | |
| 2014–2018 | NCIS: Los Angeles | Madge/Kim Nguyen | Season 6/9, 2 Episodes | |
| 2022 | The Neighborhood | Mai | Season 5, "Welcome Back to the Neighborhood" | |
| 2024 | The Sympathizer | Major's Mother | Limited Series, Recurring | |
| 2025 | Dope Thief | Xuan "Grandma" Pham | Season 1, Recurring | |

== Accolades ==
She was named "Refugee of the Year" by the United States Congress in 1990, received the "Warrior Woman Award" from the Asian Pacific Women's Network, and was the only Vietnamese person invited to speak at the 10th anniversary ceremonies for the Vietnam Memorial in Washington, DC. At the 2003 Vietnamese International Film Festival, Chinh received the Lifetime Achievement Award. In the same year, at the Festival Internazionale Cinema delle Donne (Women's International Film Festival) in Turin, Chinh was awarded the Special Acting Award (Premio Speciale Per La Miglior Interpretazione Femminile) for her role in Face. Three years later, the San Diego Asian Film Festival honored her with the Lifetime Achievement Award. In 2015, the San Francisco Bay Area – Festival of Globe (FOGsv) honors Chinh with a Lifetime Achievement Award for her contributions to the film industry and more. A documentary based on her life, Kieu Chinh: A Journey Home by Patrick Perez / KTTV, won the Emmy Awards in 1996. Chinh was honored as the 2009 Woman of the Year for her work in film and community service by State Senator Lou Correa. In addition, she was awarded a Humanitarian Award at the Asian World Film Festival in 2021.

| Organizations (Note: Awards, festivals, honors and other miscellaneous organizations are listed in alphabetical order.) | Year (Note: Indicates the year of ceremony.) | Category | Work | Result | Ref. |
|---|---|---|---|---|---|
| Asia-Pacific Film Festival | 1972 | Most Popular Actress of Asia | | Won | |
| Asia-Pacific Film Festival | 1973 | Best Leading Actress | Warrior, Who Are You | Won | |
| Asian World Film Festival | 2021 | Snow Leopard Lifetime Achievement Award | | Honored | |
| Asian World Film Festival | 2021 | Winn Slavin Humanitarian Award | | Honored | |
| Boat People SOS | 2010 | In Pursuit of Liberty Award | | Won | |
| Committee of Vietnamese Overseas Artists | 1994 | Lifetime Achievement Award | | Honored | |
| Festival Internazionale Cinema delle Donne | 2003 | Special Acting Award Face | | Won | |
| Festival of Globe (FOGsv) | 2015 | Lifetime Achievement Award | | Honored | |
| Gold House | 2023 | Gold Generation Award | The Joy Luck Club | Won (Note: Shared with the cast & executive producer.) | |
| Los Angeles Emmy Awards | 1996 | Light News Story | Kieu Chinh: A Journey Home | Won | |
| San Diego Asian Film Festival | 2006 | Lifetime Achievement Award | | Honored | |
| South Vietnam | 1969 | Best Actress Award | | Won | |
| United States Congress | 1990 | Refugee of the Year | | Honored | |
| United States Congress | 2017 | 60th Anniversary of Kieu Chinh Cinema | | Honored | |
| Vietnamese International Film Festival | 2003 | Lifetime Achievement Award | | Honored | |
| Women Making a Difference Award | 2009 | Woman of the Year | | Won | |

== See also ==
- La Thoại Tân
- Phạm Duy
- Thẩm Thúy Hằng
