= Phạm Ngọc Thảo =

North Vietnamese spy (1922–1965)

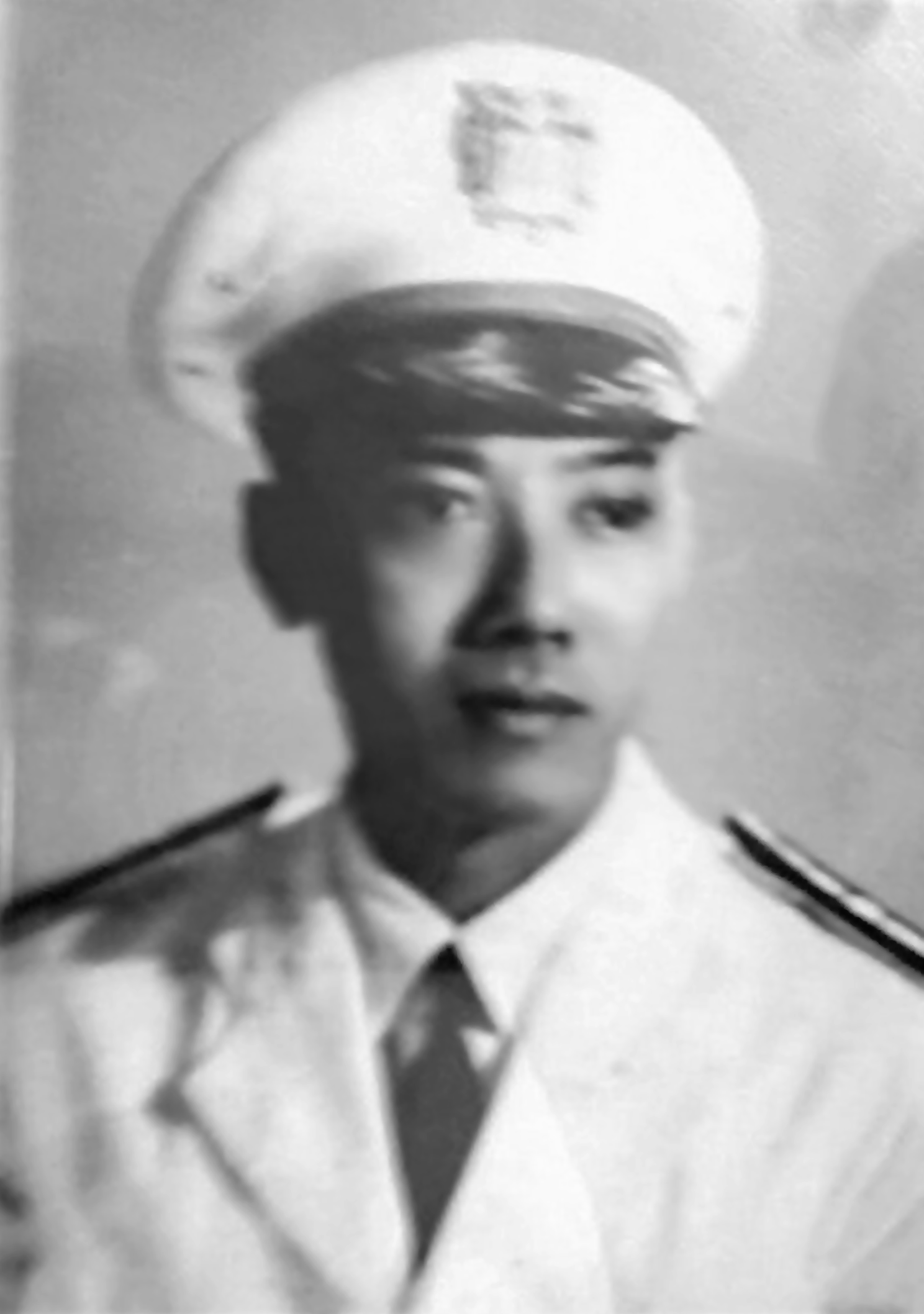
- Thảo in 1964
- Born: 14 February 1922; Can Tho, Cochinchina, French Indochina
- Died: 17 July 1965 (aged 43); Saigon, South Vietnam
- Military career
- Allegiance: Viet Minh (1946–1954); Viet Cong (as an intelligence agent, 1957–1965); Army of the Republic of Vietnam (1960–1965)
- Service years: 1960–1965
- Rank: Colonel
- Awards: Hero of the People's Armed Forces (posthumous)

Phạm Ngọc Thảo (IPA: Hanoi: [fâˀm ŋoˀk tʰa᷉ɔ], Saigon: [fə̂ˀm ŋoˀk tʰə᷉ɔ]), also known as Albert Thảo (14 February 1922 – 17 July 1965), was a Vietnamese military officer and spy. He was a sleeper agent of the Việt Minh (and, later, of the People's Army of Vietnam (PAVN)) who infiltrated the Army of the Republic of Vietnam (ARVN) and also became a major provincial leader in South Vietnam. In 1962, he was made overseer of Ngô Đình Nhu's Strategic Hamlet Program in South Vietnam and deliberately forced it forward at an unsustainable speed, causing the production of poorly equipped and poorly defended villages and the growth of rural resentment toward the regime of President Ngô Đình Diệm, Nhu's elder brother. In light of the failed land reform efforts in South Vietnam, the Hanoi government welcomed Thao's efforts to undermine Diem.

During the First Indochina War, Thảo was a communist officer in the Việt Minh and helped oversee various operations in the Mekong Delta in the far south, at one point commanding his future enemy Nguyễn Khánh, who briefly served the communist cause. After the French withdrawal and the partition of Vietnam, Thảo stayed in the south and made a show of renouncing communism. He became part of the military establishment in the anti-communist southern regime and quickly rose through the ranks. Nominally Catholic, Thảo befriended Diệm's elder brother, Archbishop Pierre Martin Ngô Đình Thục; the devoutly Roman Catholic Ngô family strongly favored co-religionists and had great trust in Thảo, unaware that he was still loyal to the communists. He went on to serve as the chief of Bến Tre Province, and gained fame after the area—traditionally a communist stronghold—suddenly became peaceful and prosperous. Vietnamese and US officials, as well as journalists hostile to or supportive of Saigon, misinterpreted this as a testament to Thảo's great ability, and he was promoted to a more powerful position where he could further his sabotage. Thảo and the communists in the local area had simply stopped fighting, so that the communists could quietly recuperate, while Thảo would appear to be very skillful and be given a more important job where he could do more damage.

Through intrigue, Thảo also helped destabilise and ultimately unseat two South Vietnamese regimes: Diem's and the military junta of Khánh. As the Diệm regime began to unravel in 1963, Thảo was one of the officers planning a coup. His plot was ultimately integrated into the successful plot and his activities promoted infighting which weakened the government and distracted the military from fighting the Viet Cong insurgency. Throughout 1964 and 1965, as South Vietnam was struggling to establish a stable state after the ousting of Diệm, Thảo was involved in several intrigues and coup plots which diverted the government from implementing its programs. In 1965, he went into hiding after a failed attempt to seize power from Khánh and was sentenced to death in absentia. Although this coup also failed, the subsequent chaos forced Khánh's junta to collapse. Thảo died the same year he was forced into hiding; it is believed that he was murdered after a bounty was placed on his head.

Thảo's real identity as a sleeper agent was kept secret after the end of Vietnam War. One of the reasons was to protect Thảo's family, which at that time had members living in the United States. His secret identity was eventually revealed and the unified Socialist Republic of Vietnam posthumously awarded him the title Hero of the People's Armed Forces in 1995.

== Early Việt Minh years ==
Born Phạm Ngọc Thuần, Thảo was one of eleven children of a Vietnamese Roman Catholic family. At the time, Vietnam was a French colony. The family held French citizenship but opposed French colonialism. His father, an engineer, once headed an underground communist organisation in Paris, which assisted the Việt Minh's anti-French pro-independence activities outside Vietnam. After attending French schools in Saigon, Thuần changed his name to Thảo and renounced his French citizenship. In his high school years at the Lycée Chasseloup-Laubat, Thảo met Trương Như Tảng, who later became a high-ranking member of the Viet Cong (VC), a communist guerrilla organisation in South Vietnam. Tảng described Thảo as "my dearest friend" and recalled that they had "spent endless hours talking about everything under the sun. We were closer than brothers."

Thảo spent his teenage years obsessed with his motorcycle. Despite being educated at an upper-class school that served children of French colonial administrators and privileged Vietnamese—French was the medium of instruction and Gallic culture and history a major part of the curriculum—Thảo was attracted to nationalist politics. He participated in Hồ Chí Minh's revolutionary campaigns for Vietnamese independence and joined the Việt Minh.

In September 1945, Hồ declared independence under the Democratic Republic of Vietnam (DRV) following the withdrawal of Imperial Japan, which had seized control of the country from France during the Second World War. At the time, there was a power vacuum, as both Japan and France had been decimated by the war and also both countries governments, the Empire of Japan and Vichy France were part of the Axis powers and declared fascists. There was an outbreak of nationalist fervour in Vietnam; Tảng and Thảo joined the Vanguard Youth, an impromptu independence militia. Tảng was assigned to be the leader of the local unit, but he left the movement soon after, leaving Thảo in command. During this period, Saigon was regularly engulfed in riots.

In 1946, France attempted to reassert control over its colony and conventional military fighting broke out. Thảo served with the Việt Minh in the Mekong Delta in the far south of Vietnam during the war against French rule from 1946 to 1954. He almost met his end before he had started; he was apprehended by the local communists in Mỹ Tho, who saw his French-style dress and mistook him for a colonial agent. They tied him up and chained him to a block of stone before throwing him into a river to drown. However, Thảo broke free of the weight and swam to safety. Thảo proceeded further south and deeper into the Mekong Delta to the town of Vĩnh Long, where he was again arrested by the local Việt Minh. Just as Thảo was about to be executed by drowning, one of the communists realised he was a brother of one of their comrades. Thảo was released and rejoined his family, who lived in the region.

As a leader of the resistance, Thảo was allocated the responsibility of indoctrinating the 1947 batch of recruits with Việt Minh ideology. One of Thảo's students was his future enemy, South Vietnamese General and President Nguyễn Khánh. This group became the 410th Battalion and went on to fight near Cà Mau, the southernmost part of Vietnam. By 1949, Thảo was in charge of the Việt Minh espionage apparatus around Saigon and organised the guerrilla companies in the countryside. Thảo was also involved in procuring arms. Filipino traders brought arms into southern Vietnam in return for rice, shrimp, pork, gold and banknotes. Following the French defeat in 1954 at Điện Biên Phủ, Thảo helped evacuate communist fighters from South Vietnam and Cambodia in accordance with the terms of the Geneva Conference. Under these Accords, Vietnam was to be temporarily divided at the 17th parallel pending national elections to reunify the country in 1956, and military personnel were to be evacuated to their respective sides of the border. In the meantime, Hồ Chí Minh's Việt Minh controlled the north under the DRV while the south was under the French-sponsored State of Vietnam.

Thảo remained in the anti-communist south when Vietnam was partitioned and made a show of renouncing communism. He became a schoolteacher and later worked in a bank, as well as the Department of Transport. He consistently refused to turn in the names of his former comrades, claiming that they were merely patriots fighting against the French and were not communists. At the same time, one of Thảo's brothers had been appointed as North Vietnam's ambassador to East Germany, having served as vice chairman of the Việt Minh's Resistance Committee for the South during the war against the French. In October 1955, Prime Minister Diệm ousted Emperor Bảo Đại in a referendum to determine the form of government of the State of Vietnam. "Republic" received almost 99% of the vote and "monarchy" received a little over 1%. Diệm declared himself president of the newly proclaimed Republic of Vietnam. He scrapped the national elections, citing the fact that South Vietnam was not a signatory to the Accords of the Geneva Conference.

== Undercover communist in the South Vietnamese army ==
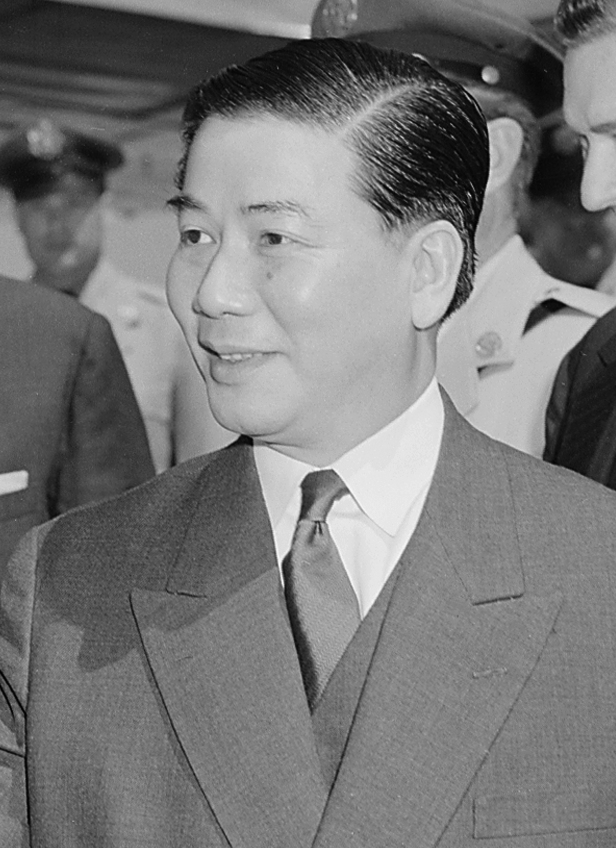
Thảo used his family's Catholic connections to quickly rise under President Diệm, shown here in May 1957.

The U.S.-backed Diệm was passionately anti-communist. In 1957, he initiated an "Anti-Communist Denunciation Campaign" to root out Việt Minh members and their sympathisers. Thousands of people were killed or jailed, and in time Diệm's campaigns created more sympathy for the Việt Minh. Before 1960, various small-scale pro-Communist uprisings were taking place in the countryside. Thảo went on the run and hid in Vĩnh Long, worried that Diệm's men were after him. In December 1960, North Vietnam's Politburo authorised the creation of the National Front for the Liberation of South Vietnam, popularly known as the Viet Cong. The VC were dominated by communists, but portrayed itself as a nationalist militant organisation, stating its aim to be the "reunification of the fatherland" with the overthrow of the "disguised colonial regime of the U.S. imperialists and the dictatorial Ngo Dinh Diem administration". The creation of the Vietcong marked an escalation in the scale and organisation of the insurgency that developed into the Vietnam War.

Thảo's Catholic background helped him to avoid detection as a communist. He and his brother were the only members of the family who were not anti-communist. The remainder of the relatives were followers of Diệm's brother, Archbishop Thục, who had been Bishop of Vĩnh Long during the war against France. Thảo was known to have a face that revealed nothing of his inner feelings. Thục's intervention helped Thảo rise in the Army of the Republic of Vietnam (ARVN). Thục put Thảo in touch with Trần Kim Tuyến, who was in charge of intelligence operations under Diệm's younger brother Nhu, who was the head of the secret police and controlled the ARVN Special Forces. Thảo began as a propagandist for various units of the army and for the secret Catholic Cần lao Party, whose system of informants and secret cells helped create the atmosphere of a police state and maintained the Ngô family's grip on power.

Tảng believed that Thục "undoubtedly considered that Thảo's Catholic and family loyalties were stronger and more durable than his youthful enthusiasm for revolution". He felt that Thảo had tricked Thục into believing that he was no longer a communist, and that his inside knowledge would be useful to the Ngô family. Thảo started by training the Civil Guard. As a result of his family's Catholic connections, Thảo rose steadily in the ARVN, since Diệm's regime had always promoted officers primarily on religious preference and loyalty. Nhu sent him to Malaysia to study counterinsurgency techniques, and upon his return, Thảo became a vital part of Nhu's efforts to purge the army of disloyal officers. As Thảo kept a close watch on those who commanded troops, lest they use their personnel in a coup, the leading officers were keen to maintain a good relationship with him, which increased his effectiveness as a spy. Thảo rose even further when the troops he commanded helped put down the November 1960 coup attempt against Diệm. Thảo assisted Khánh and Trần Thiện Khiêm to put down the revolt. All three were promoted, with the latter pair gaining the leadership of the ARVN and of the combined forces, respectively. This cemented the trio's close ties.

Thảo was promoted to the post of chief of Bến Tre Province. He covertly worked with the cadres of Nguyễn Thị Định, a VC leader who later became the highest ranking female communist in post-war reunified Vietnam. The area was a traditional communist stronghold, and anti-government attacks had increased in recent times, but it suddenly became peaceful when Thảo arrived. There were rumours that Thảo and the communists had decided to cease fighting for their mutual benefit; the guerrillas could quietly strengthen themselves, while Thảo would appear to be successful and he would be promoted to a more powerful position where he could cause more damage to Diệm. The lack of fighting between Thảo's forces and the VC proved to be beneficial to the VC cause. In a three-month period in 1963, the VC were able to recruit 2,000 men in Bến Tre and formed two more battalions. Thảo was praised by the Ngô family and U.S. military advisors, unaware of his ruse. He received another promotion, and with it, more influence and contacts among the officer corps.

The US ambassador, Elbridge Durbrow, described Bến Tre Province as an "agricultural showplace" and advised journalists to travel there to see Thảo's successful administration. The influential American journalist Joe Alsop changed his plans so that he could spend more time in Bến Tre, saying that the province "particularly inspires hope". In one operation by Thảo's ARVN forces, American field journalists covering the battle saw their hours-long attempt to box in a VC battalion yield only one farmer who lived in a hut with antigovernment slogans. Despite this, the American journalists and Vietnamese officers remained unaware that Thảo was a double agent. In fact, the Pulitzer Prize-winning journalist David Halberstam misinterpreted the lack of attacks in Bến Tre, while other provinces were being ravaged, as proof that Thảo was one of the few capable government officials in the Mekong Delta. Journalist Robert Shaplen wrote: "In all respects, Thao is one of the most remarkable Vietnamese around, being a conspiratorial revolutionary figure straight out of a Malraux novel and, at the same time, a highly sophisticated and astute man, whose talents, if only they were properly channeled, could profitably be used right now." As Thảo was a former leader of the Việt Minh, outsiders thought that his apparent success was due his first-hand knowledge of communist tactics. During his period as the province chief, Thảo set up the Council of Elders, a consultative body of 20–200 men and women, who were allowed to criticise local officials. He advocated the creation of the Council of Patrons, a philanthropic body to raise money for community projects.

== Strategic Hamlet Program ==
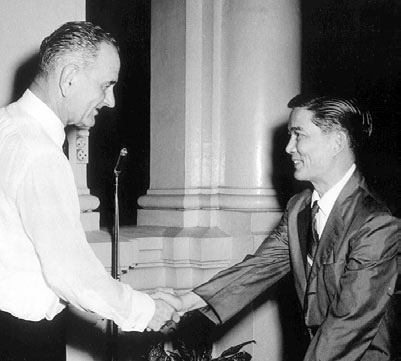
Ngô Đình Nhu (right), appointed Thảo to supervise the Strategic Hamlet Program, unaware he was a communist agent intent on sabotage. (with US VP LBJ in 1961)

In 1962, Nhu began work on the ambitious Strategic Hamlet Program, an attempt to build fortified villages that would be secure zones for rural Vietnamese. The objective was to lock the VC out so that they could not operate among the villagers. Thảo supervised these efforts, and when told that the peasants resented being forcibly removed from their ancestral lands and put into forts that they were forced to build, he advised Nhu and Tuyến that it was imperative to build as many hamlets as fast as possible. This pleased the VC, who felt that Thảo's efforts were turning the rural populace against Saigon. Thảo specifically had villages built in areas that he knew had a strong VC presence. This increased the number of VC sympathisers who were placed inside the hamlets and given identification cards. As a result, the VC were able to more effectively penetrate the villages to access supplies and personnel.

Later in 1962, United States Secretary of Defense Robert McNamara visited South Vietnam and was taken on an inspection tour of the country, accompanied by Diệm and Thảo. Perhaps because Thảo divulged the tour details to VC guerrillas, each of McNamara's stopovers was punctuated by bloody attacks on nearby ARVN installations. For example, when McNamara was in Bình Dương Province, five government soldiers were killed. As he flew from Đà Lạt north to Đà Nẵng near the Demilitarized Zone, he was greeted by a VC bombing of a southbound troop train, which killed 27 and wounded 30 Civil Guard members.

== Fall of Diệm ==
In 1963, the Diệm regime began to lose its tight control over the country as civil unrest spread as a result of the Buddhist crisis. Large scale demonstrations by the Buddhist majority erupted in response to the government shootings of nine Buddhists in Huế who were protesting against a ban on the flying of the Buddhist flag during Vesak, the birthday of Gautama Buddha. With Diệm remaining intransigent in the face of Buddhist demands for religious equality, sections of society began calling for his removal from power. Thảo was part of the many plots that engulfed Saigon, destabilising the regime. Aiming for a 15 July coup, Tuyến consulted with Thảo regarding his plans, but Tuyến was too closely associated with Nhu to recruit the necessary military aid and he was subsequently exiled by Nhu.

Tuyen's group ended up being led by Thảo but his initial coup plans were shelved when American CIA officer Lucien Conein instructed Thảo's superior, General Khiêm, to stop the coup on the grounds that it was premature. Thảo's motivation for involvement in the plotting is generally attributed to VC instructions for him to cause infighting within the ARVN whenever possible. He resumed plotting, intending to stage the coup on 24 October. He had recruited various infantry, marine and paratroop units for his scheme, totalling 3,000 men. Thảo's group did not carry out the coup after senior generals persuaded him to integrate his forces into their larger group, which was more likely to succeed. Thảo reasoned that aligning himself with a group of officers that were likely to successful would yield more influence in the resulting junta. The coup was successfully executed on 1 November 1963 under the leadership of Generals Dương Văn Minh and Trần Văn Đôn.

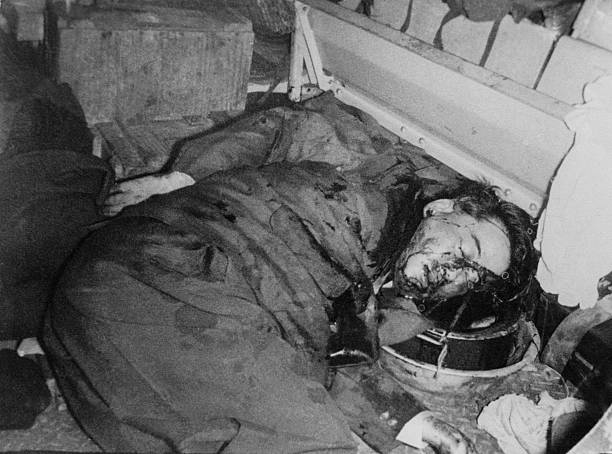
The body of Diệm, who was killed en route to military headquarters.

Thảo commanded around two dozen tanks, which formed a column in the streets surrounding the Gia Long Palace at midnight, and helped launch the full-scale attack at 03:30 on 2 November. The rebels eventually gained control of the building, and at daybreak Thảo's forces stormed the palace, but found it empty; Diệm and Nhu had escaped. A captured officer of the Presidential Guard revealed the brothers' hiding place and under the orders of Khiêm, Thảo went after them. Khiêm ordered Thảo to ensure the brothers were not physically harmed. Thảo arrived at the house in Cholon where the brothers were purportedly hiding and phoned the rebels back at the palace. Diệm and Nhu were apparently listening in on an extension in another room and escaped. The brothers subsequently surrendered to an ARVN convoy led by General Mai Hữu Xuân at a nearby Catholic church and were executed en route to military headquarters despite being promised safe exile.

The US media's links to Thảo have been the source of historical debate. The journalists' reporting of Diệm's authoritarian rule, military failures, and attacks on Buddhists shifted American public opinion and put pressure on Washington to withdraw support for the Ngô family and seek a change of leadership. William Prochnau felt that the fall of Diệm was the biggest influence of the media on American foreign policy in over six decades. Thảo and Phạm Xuân Ẩn had been the source of much of the media's information. Conservative revisionist historians have accused the media of bringing down Diệm by publishing reports that, according to them, were based on false data disseminated by communist propagandists to unfairly malign Diệm's rule, which they claim was effective and fair towards the Buddhist majority.

== Participation in military junta ==
After the fall of the Diệm regime, Thảo was designated by the head of state Minh and the civilian Prime Minister Nguyễn Ngọc Thơ to create the nucleus of a group called the Council of Notables, and promote it to the public. which, as an interim body of prominent civilians, would advise the military junta before it handed over power to an elected legislature under civilian rule. The Council of 60 people, 58 men and two women, held its first meeting on 1 January 1964 in Saigon. The council was composed almost entirely of well-known professionals and academics and, as such, was hardly representative of South Vietnamese society; there were no delegates from the agricultural or labour sectors of the economy. It gained a reputation for being a forum of debate, rather than a means of enacting policy change and government programs for the populace. Thơ and Minh assigned Thảo with the task of encouraging a transition to democracy by facilitating the formation of a few political parties. This was ineffective, as many political parties with only a handful of members sprang up and squabbled. Within 45 days of the coup, 62 parties had formed but nothing meaningful resulted. In the end, these efforts proved to be irrelevant as Minh's junta and the accompanying Council of Notables were overthrown before the end of the month. During this period, Thảo served as the head of military security and played a role in replacing Colonel Đỗ Khắc Mai with Nguyễn Cao Kỳ as the head of the Republic of Vietnam Air Force. In the aftermath of the coup, VC attacks increased markedly amid infighting among the Saigon leadership, which Thảo had helped to stir up.

The generals sent Thảo to Fort Leavenworth in the United States for six months to learn conventional warfare tactics. He also spent a month in England before returning to South Vietnam. By this time, Minh's junta had been replaced in a 1964 January coup by Khánh. It is suspected that one of the generals' motives for deploying Thảo overseas was his continual involvement in plotting. Khánh appointed Thảo as his press officer as well as an unofficial political adviser.

Later that same year, Khánh became involved in a power struggle with his deputy Khiêm as well as Minh, who had been retained as the titular head of state. Thảo was a close friend of Khiêm, so when Khánh prevailed in the power struggle, Khánh despatched Khiêm to Washington as the ambassador with Thảo was his press attaché. In August 1964, Khánh's leadership became increasingly troubled after he tried to augment his powers by declaring a state of emergency. This only provoked large-scale protests and riots calling for an end to military rule, with Buddhist activists at the forefront. Fearful of losing power, Khánh began making concessions to the protesters and promised democracy in the near future, which encouraged more groups to demand changes, and Khánh demoted certain Catholic pro-Diệm supporters. On 13 September, a Catholic-dominated group led by Generals Lâm Văn Phát and Dương Văn Đức, both of whom had been demoted, moved troops into Saigon, but then withdrew after it became obvious they did not have the numbers to remove Khánh. Khiêm and Thảo were implicated in helping to plot Phát and Đức's attempted putsch; both were sent abroad by Khánh.

== 1965 attempted coup ==
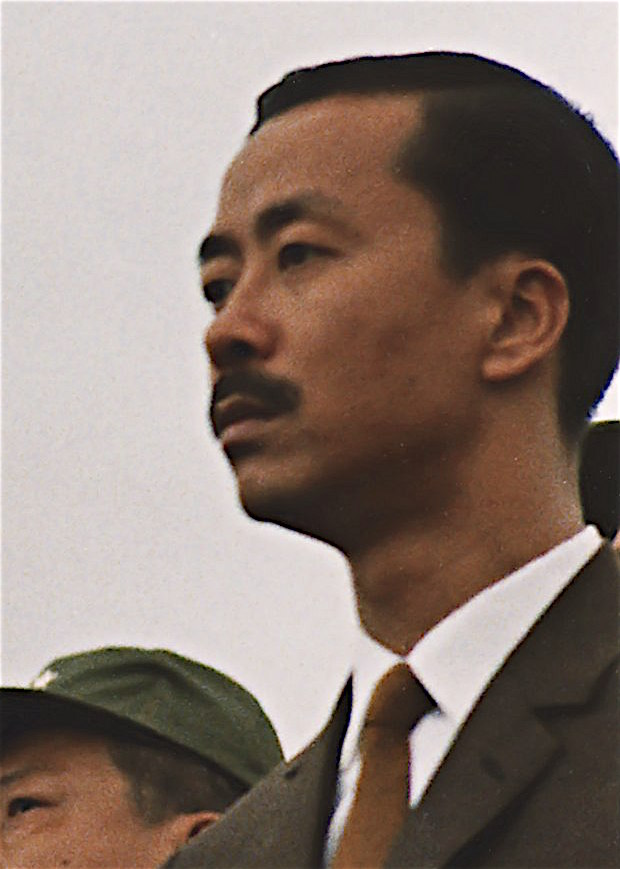
Air Force chief Nguyễn Cao Kỳ thwarted Thảo's attempted coup in 1965. Thảo was sentenced to death in absentia by a military tribunal under Ky.

In late December 1964, Thảo was summoned back to Saigon by Khánh, who correctly suspected him and Khiêm of plotting together with Washington. Thảo suspected Khánh was attempting to have him killed, so he went underground upon returning to Saigon, and began plotting in earnest, having been threatened with being charged for desertion. He sheltered in a house belonging to a friend of Trương Như Tảng. The ruling junta appealed to Thảo in newspaper advertisements and broadcasts to follow orders to report, but he ignored them. In mid-January 1965, the regime called for him to report to his superiors in the ARVN, warning that he would be "considered guilty of abandoning his post with all the consequences of such a situation" if he failed to do so.

Due to his Catholic background, Thảo was able to recruit Diệm loyalists such as Phát. With Khánh's grip on power shaky, an anonymous source said that Thảo was worried about how he would be treated if someone else took over: "Thao acted first, out of fear that if he did not, the other generals would overthrow Khanh and get rid of him as well. He knew that if the others overthrew Khanh his fate would be worse than Khanh's." During this time, Thảo kept in touch with elements of the CIA in an attempt to get American backing. Meanwhile, Khiêm had been putting pressure on Khánh for over two months by charging him and the Buddhists of seeking a "neutralist solution" and "negotiating with the communists". At the same time, Khánh's relationship with the Americans—particularly Ambassador and retired General Maxwell Taylor—had broken down over a series of policy disputes and personal arguments, and the Americans were trying to encourage Khánh's colleagues to overthrow him so that more hawkish policies could be enacted. The other generals wanted to overthrow Khánh and were aware that Thảo—who was widely distrusted—was planning to make a move. They anticipated trouble in trying to keep their subordinates, who were becoming impatient with Khánh's ongoing tenure, from joining Thảo. Between January and February, Thảo continued to finalize the details of his own counter-coup, using the contacts he had cultivated over the past decades.

Phát and other pro-Diệm officers opposed the Buddhist influence being exerted on Khánh. Thảo consulted Kỳ—who wanted to seize power for himself—before the plot, and exhorted him to join the coup, but Kỳ claimed that he was remaining neutral. Thảo thus believed Kỳ would not intervene against him, but Kỳ was strongly opposed to Thảo and Phát. American intelligence analysts had believed that General Don was involved in the coup with Phát and Thảo, but this was proven false when the action started. Eight months after the coup was over, Don told the American historian George McTurnan Kahin that he had been plotting with Thảo, who had planned for him to become Defense Minister and Chief of Staff of the military, but that the Đại Việt and Thảo's Catholic civilian allies had insisted on installing Khiêm, a Catholic. A month before the coup, American intelligence analysts had believed that Thảo was planning to replace Khánh as commander-in-chief with Don.

Shortly before noon on 19 February, he used around 50 tanks, their crew and a mixture of infantry battalions to seize control of the military headquarters, the post office and the radio station of Saigon. He surrounded the home of Khánh and Gia Long Palace, the residence of head of state Phan Khắc Sửu. The tanks were led by Colonel Dương Hiếu Nghĩa, a Catholic member of the Đại Việt. The country was still trying to find stability, with Phan Huy Quát being appointed prime minister just three days earlier. Khánh managed to escape and flee to Vũng Tàu. His plane lifted off from Tan Son Nhut Air Base, the country's military headquarters, just as rebel tanks were rolling in, attempting to block the runway. Thảo's men tried to capture the Saigon base of the Republic of Vietnam Navy, and its commander, Admiral Chung Tấn Cang, but were foiled, but they did capture a number of junta members at Tan Son Nhut.

Thảo made a radio announcement stating that the sole objective of his military operation was to get rid of Khánh, whom he described as a "dictator". He said that he intended to recall Khiêm to Saigon to lead the Armed Forces Council in place of Khánh, but would retain the civilian cabinet that answered to the generals. In doing so, he caught Khiêm off guard, asleep in his Maryland home. When informed of what was happening, Khiêm sent a cable in which he pledged "total support" to the plot. The coup group made pro-Diệm announcements, claiming then-U.S. Ambassador Henry Cabot Lodge Jr. "was wrong in encouraging the coup against Diem rather than correcting mistakes".

A Catholic rebel officer made a speech extolling Diệm, and mourning his loss. This gave the impression that the coup plotters wanted to roll back the country to a Diệm-era position and punish those who had been involved in Diệm's overthrow and execution. Thảo's group also promised to aggressively fight the VC and cooperate with the United States. Throughout the day, a series of anti-Khánh speeches were broadcast on radio, and the rebels claimed to have the support of four divisions, something that was regarded as dubious. U.S. government analysts concluded that the rebellion was "primarily a move by die-hard neo-Diemists and Catholic military militants, disturbed at the rise of Buddhist influence, opposed to Gen. Khánh and—in a vague, ill-thought-out way—desirous of turning back the clock and undoing some of the results of the November 1963 ouster of Diem." Among the civilians linked to Thảo's plot were Catholic academics and a militant priest.

As Diệm had strongly discriminated along religious lines, the rebels' comments caused a negative response among the Buddhist majority. The Buddhist activist monk Thich Tam Chau called on Buddhists to support the incumbent junta. The pro-Diệm speeches also alarmed pro-Buddhist and anti-Diệm generals, such as Nguyễn Chánh Thi and Nguyễn Hữu Có, who had been part of the failed 1960 and successful 1963 coups against Diệm respectively. They thought that Thảo and Phat might seek revenge, driving many anti-Diệm officers who may have otherwise been neutral or sympathetic to the coup, to swing more towards Khánh.

Although Taylor and US military commander General William Westmoreland wanted Khánh out, the pro-Diệm political ideology expressed by Thảo's supporters alienated them, as they feared that the coup plotters would destabilize and polarize the country if they took power. The Americans worried that Phat and Thảo could galvanize support for Khánh through their extreme views, which had the potential to provoke large-scale sectarian divisions, playing into the hands of the communists and hindering wider American objectives. They were also worried by Thảo's intention to remove Quát and the civilian government, whom he saw was "too susceptible to Buddhist peacemongering". The U.S. saw civilian participation in governance as a necessity. They worried that a Khánh victory would enhance his prestige, so they wanted to see some third force emerge and defeat both the Thảo and Khánh factions. Westmoreland and Taylor decided to work for the failure of both Thảo and Khánh, and helped organize US advisers for the purpose.

Phat was supposed to seize the Bien Hoa Air Base to prevent air force chief Kỳ from mobilising air power against them, but he failed to reach the airfield before Kỳ, who circled Tan Son Nhut and threatened to bomb the rebels. Most of the forces of the III and IV Corps surrounding the capital disliked both Khánh and the rebels, and took no action. However, as night came, senior military opinion began to turn against Thảo and Phát, although it was not clear at this stage whether the anti-Thảo forces being organised and led by Thi were hostile to Khánh as well.

At 20:00, Phát and Thảo met with Kỳ, and insisted that Khánh be removed from power. The coup collapsed when, between midnight and dawn, anti-Thảo forces swept into the city from the south along with some components of the 7th Airborne Brigade loyal to Kỳ from Biên Hòa in the north. Whether the rebels were genuinely defeated by the overwhelming show of strength or whether a deal was struck with Kỳ to end the revolt in exchange for Khánh's removal is disputed, although a large majority support the latter. According to the latter version, Phát and Thảo agreed to free the members of the Armed Forces Council that they had arrested and withdraw in exchange for Khánh's complete removal from power. Possibly as a means of saving face, Phát and Thảo were given an appointment with the figurehead chief of state Sửu, who was under close control by the junta, to "order" him to sign a decree stripping Khánh of his military leadership, and organizing a meeting of the junta and Prime Minister Quát's civilian cabinet. During the early morning, while the radio station was still in the hands of Thảo's men, a message attributed to Sửu was read out; it claimed that the chief of state had sacked Khánh. However, the authenticity of the announcement was put into doubt when loyalists took control of the station and Sửu spoke in person, claiming otherwise. There were no injuries or deaths in the coup.

Before fleeing, Thảo broadcast a premature message claiming the coup had been effective in removing Khánh, and the Armed Forces Council later adopted a vote of no confidence in Khánh later that day, and forced him into exile. Later in the morning, while on the run, Thảo made a broadcast using a military radio system to call for Khanh's departure and defend his actions, which he described as being in the best interest of the nation. Phat and Thảo were stripped of their ranks, but nothing was initially done as far as prosecuting or sentencing them for their involvement in the coup.

== Hiding and death ==
While in hiding in Catholic villages, Thảo expressed his willingness to surrender and cooperate with Quát's government, if he and approximately 50 officers involved in the coup were granted amnesty. He also offered to go into exile in the United States, where his family had moved when he was sent there for training in 1964. In May 1965, a military tribunal sentenced both Thảo and Phát to death in absentia. The death sentence was attributed to the influence of Thi, who had assigned hit squads to look for him. After the conclusion of the trial, it was announced that the Armed Forces Council would disband and give the civilians more control in running the government. Thi was believed to have agreed to the transfer of power to a civilian government in return for Thảo's death. As a result, Thảo had little choice but to attempt to seize power in order to save himself and he and Thi began to manoeuvre against one another.

On 20 May, a half dozen officers and around forty civilians, most or all of whom were Catholic, were arrested on charges of attempting to assassinate Quát and kidnap Thi and Kỳ. Several of the arrested were known supporters of Thảo and believed to be abetting him in evading the authorities. Despite this, Thảo himself managed to escape, even as a US$30,000 bounty was put on him by the junta. On 16 July 1965, he was reported dead in unclear circumstances; an official report claimed that he died of injuries while on a helicopter en route to Saigon, after being captured north of the city. However, it is generally assumed that he was murdered or tortured to death on the orders of some military officials. One report holds that a Catholic priest betrayed Thảo, while another claims General Nguyễn Văn Thiệu caught him. In his memoirs, Kỳ claimed Thảo had been captured by police in Saigon and "died in jail a few weeks later, probably from a beating". After the Fall of Saigon in 1975, a conspiracy theory emerged, maintaining that Thảo went underground and worked in counterintelligence for the communist Central Office of South Vietnam, helping to hunt down VC cadres who had defected to Saigon.

== Legacy ==
Although Thảo's last plot failed, his activities in 1965 and the resultant infighting led to a series of internal purges within the ARVN. Amid the instability, the VC made strong gains across the country throughout the year. In response to the deteriorating military situation, the Americans began to deploy combat troops to South Vietnam in large numbers.

Thảo was posthumously promoted by the ARVN to the rank of one–star general and awarded the title of martyr (Vietnamese: Liệt sĩ). After the Fall of Saigon and the end of the Vietnam War, the communist government awarded him the same title and paid war pensions to his family, claiming him as one of their own. In 1981, the communists had his body exhumed and reburied in the "Patriots' cemetery" in Ho Chi Minh City (previously Saigon). Tảng believed Thảo "was a man who throughout his life fought single-mindedly for Vietnam's independence". Tảng, who later abandoned communism, said that Thảo "was a nationalist, not an ideologue", and credited him with turning the military tide towards the communists by helping to bring down Diệm and fomenting chronic instability and infighting for 18 months. Hồ Chí Minh had reacted to Diệm's death by saying "I can scarcely believe that the Americans would be so stupid". A communist report written in March 1965, soon after Thảo's revolt had caused Khánh to depart, stated that "The balance of force ... has changed very rapidly in our favor. ... The bulk of the enemy's armed forces ... have disintegrated, and what is left continues to disintegrate".

Phạm Ngọc Thảo was the prototype of Nguyễn Thành Luân, who was the main protagonist of the novel called Cards on the Table, which was written by Trần Bạch Đằng (under the pen name Nguyễn Trương Thiên Lý), and the 8-episode telefilm adaptation of the same name directed by Lê Hoàng Hoa.
