= Anh Tuấn =

Vietnamese voice actor

Nguyễn Anh Tuấn
- Born: October 23, 1984 (age 41); Vietnam
- Occupation: Voice actor
- Years active: 2008 - present

Anh Tuấn (full name: Nguyễn Anh Tuấn) is a Vietnamese voice actor who was born on October 23, 1984, in Vietnam. He previously worked at TVM Corp (HTV3). He had dubbed for other characters in cartoons, anime, television series, movies... and the popular role was Nobita in Doraemon anime and movie.

== Work ==
=== TV series ===
- My Girlfriend Is a Nine-Tailed Fox (Cha Dae-woong)
- City Hunter (TV series) (Lee Yoon Sung)
- Brilliant Legacy (Sun Woo Hwan)
- The Innocent Man (TV series) (Kang Ma-roo)
- The Heirs (Kim Tan)
- Boys Over Flowers (TV series) (Jun Pyo)
- Secret Campus (Do Hyun)
- The 1st Shop of Coffee Prince (Han Kyul)
- You're Beautiful (TV series) (Hwang Tae Kyung)
- 1 Litre no Namida (TV series) (Hiroshi Mizuno)
- The Prince Who Turns into a Frog (Shan Jun Hao)
- Big (TV series) (Seo Yoon Jae/Kang Kyung Joon)
- Phantom (TV series) (Jo Hyun Min)
- Oshin (Yuu Tanokura)
- Iljimae (Iljimae/Gyeom)

=== Movie ===
- Ice Age (Manny)
- Horton Hears a Who! (Horton)
- Happy Feet (Mumble)
- Open Season (Elliot)
- Stand by Me Doraemon (Nobita)
- Rio (Blu)
- Harry Potter (Harry)

=== Cartoons and anime ===
- Captain Tsubasa (Tsubasa)
- Tsubasa: Reservoir Chronicle (Syaoran)
- Doraemon (Nobita)
- Tiểu Bao Thanh Thiên (Bao Chửng)
- Xiaolin Showdown (Omi)
- Fruit Basket (Yuki Sohma)
- Samurai 7 (Katsushiro)
- Daigunder (Akira)
- Cyborg Kuro-chan (Mikun)
- Howie & Landau (Howie)
- Cardcaptor Sakura (Yukito)
- Boys Over Flowers (Tsukasa)
- Neighborhood Story (Tsutomu)
- Pokémon (Cilan, Clemont, Meowth, Professor Oak, Kiawe)
- Naruto (Neji)
- The Smurfs (Tí Mộng Mơ)
- The Snow Queen (anime) (Kay)
- Bubu Chacha (Nicky)
- Tayo the Little Bus (Gani)
- Thomas & Friends (Edward)
