= Lý Hùng =

Vietnamese actor (born 1969)

Lý Hùng 李雄
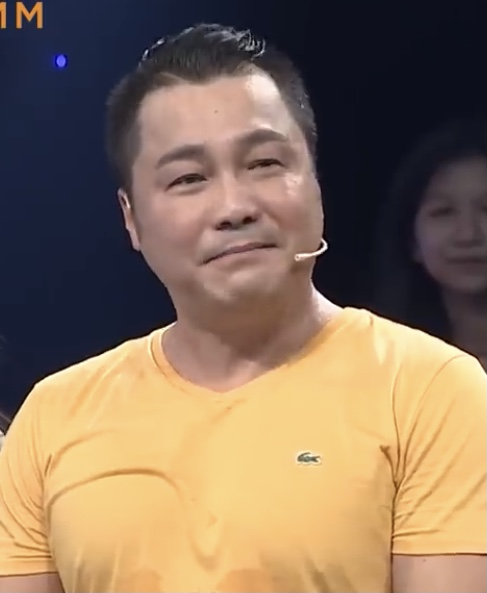
- Lý Hùng in the 2020s
- Born: Lý Hùng; February 22, 1969 (age 57); Bình Minh District, Vĩnh Long Province, Republic of Vietnam
- Education: Bachelor from the Academy of Theatre and Cinema University, 1986–1988
- Occupations: Actor, singer
- Years active: 1982–present

Lý Hùng (Chinese: 李雄; born 22 February 1969) is a Vietnamese former vovinam artist, actor, film director, producer, entrepreneur, philanthropist, activist and sometimes singer.

== Biography ==
Hùng was born in the southern part of Vietnam (formerly part of the Republic of Vietnam) on 22 February 1969. His first role was a small role in the movie Phượng in 1982. At the age of 12, he had his first leading role in his career with the movie Đàn chim và cơn bão (directed by Cao Thụy).

== Personal life ==
- Parents: Lý Huỳnh (father), Đoàn Thị Nguyên (mother)
- Brother: Lý Điền Sơn (film director and entrepreneur)
- Sisters: Lý Nga (entrepreneur), Lý Thanh (entrepreneur), Lý Hương (actress), Lý Hồng (vocalist)

== Filmography ==
- Phượng (1982)
- Nơi bình yên chim hót (1986)
- Phạm Công – Cúc Hoa (1989)
- Người không mang họ (1990)
- The Tayson Gallantry (1991)
- Nước mắt học trò (1993)
- Tây Sơn hào kiệt (2010)
- Thiên đường ở bên ta (2010)
- Về đất Thăng Long (2011)
- Nghiệt oan (2011)
- Cù lao lúa (2011)
- Cuộc đối đầu hoàn hảo (2012)
- Cuộc chiến quý ông (2014)
- Lời sám hối (2014)
- Bằng chứng vô hình
- Lớp học một không hai (2014)
- Bình minh trên ngọn lửa (2014)
- Một văn phòng luật sư (2015)
- Dệt nắng cho ngày dài hơn (2015)
- Trại cá sấu (2015)
- Ông trùm (2015)
- Thề không gục ngã (2015)
- Đoạn trường nam ai (2015)
- Đường chân trời (2016)
- Hợp đồng định mệnh (2016)
- Người nhà quê (2017)
- Biển đời giông tố (2017)
- Dollars trắng
- Lá sầu riêng
- Kế hoạch 99
- Phi vụ phượng hoàng
- Sau những giấc mơ hồng
- Đồng tiền nhân nghĩa
- Bên dòng sông Trẹm
- Hồng hải tặc
- Bước qua quá khứ
- Tình ngỡ đã phôi pha
- Đàn chim và cơn bão
- Trong vòng tay chờ đợi
- Bông hồng đẫm lệ
- Cảnh sát đặc khu
- Lệnh truy nã
- Lửa cháy thành Đại La
- Ngọc trong đá
- Ngôi nhà oan khốc
- Nước mắt buồn vui
- Sơn thần – thủy quái
- Thăng Long đệ nhất kiếm
- Võ sĩ bất đắc dĩ

== Honors ==
- Consecutively from 1991 to 1999, Lý Hùng was voted as Nam diễn viên khả ái and Nam diễn viên được yêu thích nhất by newspapers Thanh Niên and Người Lao Động vote.
- He was recognized by the Vietnam Record Book as the actor who played the most leading roles in Vietnamese films in more than 50 films.

== See also ==
- List of Vietnamese actors
- List of Vietnamese films
