= Thanh Lan =

Vietnamese singer and recipient of political asylum in the United States

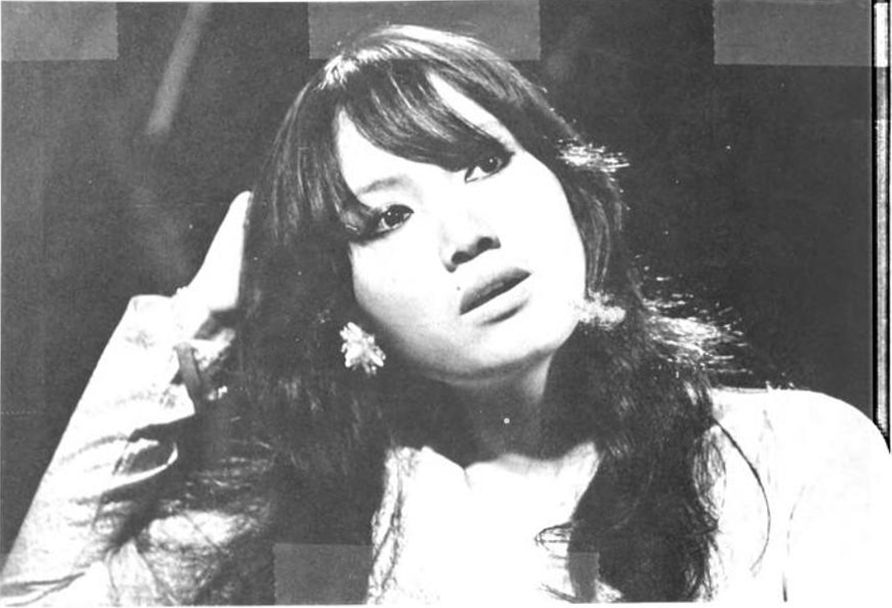
- Singer Thanh Lan on THVN's show.
- Born: Phạm Thái Thanh Lan; March 1, 1948; Vinh, Nghệ An, North Vietnam
- Citizenship: Annam (1948–1949); State of Vietnam (1949–1955); Republic of Vietnam (1955–1975); Republic of South Vietnam (1975–1976); SR. Vietnam (1976–1993); United States (1994–present)
- Occupations: Singer, actress, writer, producer, presenter
- Years active: 1960s–present
- Spouse: 1 (divorced)
- Children: 1 daughter
- Awards: National Award of Literature and Arts (1970)
- Website: YTB/ThanhLanTL

Thanh Lan (born March 1, 1948) is a Vietnamese American singer and actress. She is one of the rare artists who has been successful in all three fields of music, cinema and theatre. Thanh Lan is famous for her French songs, and is one of the representative faces of the early period of youth music in Saigon. In cinema, she has participated in many famous films such as Tiếng hát học trò and Ván bài lật ngửa.

== Biography ==
Phạm Thái Thanh Lan was born on 1 March 1948 in Nghệ An. Her saint's name is Catherine (which she would later use when registering for her first visa in the United States), but she is known by her stage name, Thanh Lan. Although both of Lan's parents were from Hanoi and Huế, known as a "throat-clear voice area" (the equivalent of received pronunciation in Britain or "standard" Italian or French), she lived in a Northern community in her childhood. This gave her a distinctive singing voice, and her Vietnamese accent is between that of Hanoi (nasal) and Saigon (tongue).

=== 1956–1969: Early life and education ===
As a high school student, Lan attended the prestigious Lycée Marie Curie. She studied piano at Saint Paul's school, run by the Sisters of Christian Charity, and she remains Roman Catholic. She later studied with Trần Anh Đào (composer Thẩm Oánh's wife), and musician Nghiêm Phú Phi. She majored in French literature at Saigon University, and from childhood she spoke French, Vietnamese and English. She audited classes in tranh, traditional, and reformed music at the Vietnam National Academy of Music.

While in her school years she joined a Vietnamese children's band (ban Việt Nhi) in order to perform in the VTVN and Vũ-đức-Duy drama bands (ban kịch Vũ Đức Duy) on the Vietnam Television Network. She also sang with the Seagull band (ban Hải Âu), and the Life Source band (ca đoàn Nguồn Sống).

=== 1970–1975: Career and fame ===
In the early 1970s, Lan took part in the Young Music Festival. She became known for her interpretations of French popular music. She also translated English-language songs into Vietnamese. Such music in its original language, especially French, was considered highbrow, and more for world travelers and academics than common people. Part of her goal in translating into Vietnamese was to make both the words and music and their specific cultural meanings accessible to a much wider audience.

In 1970, Lan starred as a main character in the coming-of-age movie Students Singing. It was produced by Alpha Films, owned by her maternal uncle Thái Thúc Nha. He was a famous filmmaker in Asia during the 1960-70s, and also president of Vietnam Cinema Society (Tổng-trưởng Hiệp-hội Điện-ảnh Việtnam), which launched and hosted the Vietnam Film Day. "Students Singing" included a nude scene that generated controversy in the Southern press, with several tabloids calling Lan a "sexy bomb," or using the highly euphemistic term "princess of gifted arts." Film critics were more positive, however, and she received the Promising Actress prize at National Award of Literature and Arts ceremony. She often collaborated with Nhật Trường.

In 1974, Japanese director Norio Osada traveled to Saigon to make the film Number Ten Blues with stars from both Japan and Vietnam. Lan suggested that Osada add a main female character and cast her, because she had been well-known in Tokyo since 1971. She had become even more famous throughout Japan after 1973, when she performed at the Yamaha Music Festival. The film was completed in March 1975 even as the political situation in South Vietnam deteriorated around them. At the Fall of Saigon in April, Lan became stranded during the panic and confusion that concluded the Vietnam War, and she was unable to escape.

The Japanese filmmakers worried when Lan went missing, and even wondered if she had died. They left the film unreleased when the studio disbanded. Later, however, the director was able to release it with the title Goodbye Saigon, to memorialize that historic event.

Thanh Lan was unable to leave Vietnam at the collapse of the Republic of Vietnam in 1975. In 1994, during a sponsored series of concerts in the United States, Vietnamese-American protesters accused her of colluding with the Hanoi government and being a communist sympathizer. Although she had been a beloved singer during the 1970s, in the U.S. she became the subject of forceful protests and even death threats. She canceled all but one of her concerts, gave interviews pleading her case, and finally prevailed in her quest for asylum.

=== 1976–1993: Censorship and emigration ===
During a "campaign to proscribe corrupt cultural products" under the new regime, Lan was censored for ten years. The censors particularly blocked her the film Students Singing, about South Vietnamese soldiers, but also for pretty much all of her discography. Her name disappeared from official mentions in Vietnamese literature and the arts during these years.

During the Renovation period, Lan performed some songs which the censorship offices accepted. She returned as one of the golden voices on the HTV channel. Though she only starred in a few films, for example, Cards on the Table (with Nguyễn Chánh Tín) and Behind a Fate (with Trần Quang), most were extremely popular. Northern young audiences particularly admired her character Thùy Dung in Cards on the Table. However, her principal work was as a voice actor and vocalist. During the 1980s her Northern sound became quite popular on Vietnamese television and in movies. Her talent was even praised by some Soviet filmmakers.

From 1991 to 1993, Lan focused on the development of her music. She cooperated with many studios for recordings, and she organized two live shows: Thanh Lan's Singing (1991) and Thanh Lan's Music Night (1992).

=== 1993–1994: Controversy ===
In 1993, Thanh Lan planned a tour across the United States. Because she had been unable to leave Vietnam at the fall of Saigon in 1975, this later drew the suspicion of some of her fans that she might be cooperating with the state. During a Congressionally-sponsored series of concerts in the United States in 1994 on a three-month visa, she initially planned a tour, and she registered at the USCIS office as "Catherine Pham," her saint's name at birth (加大肋納•范). However, she soon became the target of protestors who claimed she was a tool of the Hanoi government. Lan's only scheduled performance after the cancellations was in San Jose, and protesters turned out in force. "We are against the Hanoi propaganda scheme. Thanh Lan is only a tool. She would be welcomed back if she shows remorse for what she did and cancels the concert." During radio interviews in San Jose pleading her case, her goal was convince the protestors that she was not an agent of the communist party. She attempted to describe how much she had suffered, but she allegedly made a misstep in the eyes of many former fans when she said that Vietnam paid her well. Despite the controversy, however, she was successful in her quest for asylum, and this calmed much of the rage. Protestors were later re-angered in part by President Bill Clinton's decision to end the trade embargo with Vietnam, but these demonstrations were quieter, and Lan was no longer a target because of her asylum status. Composer Trúc Hồ from Asia Entertainment offered her a contract, and she remained in the United States permanently.

=== 1994–2013: Life in the United States ===
Initially, Lan collaborated with singer Ngọc Lan and some French-speaking amateur vocalists to perform French songs. After Ngọc Lan's death there was also a decline in interest surrounding pop française, so she collaborated again with Trần Thiện Thanh, focusing on songs of soldiers.

=== 2014–present ===
Scene of the soldiers coming to combat about March 1975 what makes me always thrilled although I watched the movie oftentimes. They [were] real warriors and also really into the battle, but nowadays no ones can answer that how was their fates after the fall...

— Thanh Lan

About 2012, an old Number Ten Blues tape was found and restored by NHK's experts. After looking for more information from Vietnamese people who lived in Japan, NHK sent staff to California. They showed Lan the restored version's DVD and invited her to attend the 2013 Fukuoka International Film Festival. In this event, she received the Audience Award for Number Ten Blues and Goodbye Saigon,

During the COVID-19 pandemic, Lan often could not fly to shows. However, she did return to Ho Chi Minh City to guest star on the Vietnamese TV show "Happy Memories, Season 2," a program on channel VTV3.

== Personal life ==
Lan entered a brief marriage at 19. Her husband, Mr. Dũng, was a man from the Long Biên district of Hanoi whose family had settled in Da Lat after Operation Passage to Freedom. After an amicable divorce, Thanh Lan and her ex-husband remain close friends.

=== Books ===
- Tumultuous Life (Bão tố cuộc đời) in Englist & Vietnamese (Garden Grove, California: Tự-Lực Bookstore & Xpress Print, 2022). In 2003 Lan told MC Jimmy Nhựt Hà from the popular channel Jimmy TV that she had begun writing her memoirs. In August 2022, she published Tumultuous Life. She primarily wrote in English, which she had spoken since childhood, and then translated her words to Vietnamese.
- Other short-stories and novels.

=== Albums ===
Records

- Việt Nam, Sóng Nhạc, Nhạc Ngày Xanh, Sơn Ca, Shotguns, Phạm Mạnh Cương, Diễm Ca, Nghệ thuật - Tâm Anh, Thương Ca, Nhã Ca, Premier, Continental, Trường Sơn,...
- Nhạc trẻ 6 - Thanh Lan
- Phạm Mạnh Cương 25 - Thanh Lan
- The best of Thanh Lan
- Tiếng hát xôn xao mộng tình đầu
- Tà áo Văn Quân

Paris By Night

NB	Song	With	Program	Year
1	Tình (Văn Phụng)	solo	Paris By Night 27	1994
2	Yêu Thầm (Lam Phương)	solo	Paris By Night 28	1994
3	Dấu Vết Tình Yêu (Ngô Thụy Miên)	solo	Paris By Night 29	1994
4	T'aimer	Franck Olivier	Paris By Night 29	1994
5	LK Hai Sắc Hoa Ti-gôn	Thái Châu	Paris By Night 32	1995
6	Con Quỳ Lạy Chúa Trên Trời (Phạm Duy, Nhất Tuấn)	solo	Paris By Night 34	1995
7	Giàn thiên lý đã xa (LV: Phạm Duy)	solo	Paris By Night 36	1996
8	LK Trả Lại Em Yêu, Kỷ Vật Cho Em (Phạm Duy)	Joseph Hiếu	Paris By Night 37	1996
9	Ru Đêm (Thanh Lan)	solo	Paris By Night 40	1997
10	Điệu Buồn Dang Dở (Hoàng Thi Thơ)	solo	Paris By Night 41	1997
11	Chiếc Bóng Bên Đường (Phạm Duy)	solo	Paris By Night 43	1998
12	LK Nhạc Pháp: Histoire D'un Amour, Et Pourtant, J'entends Siffler Le Train (500 Miles), Je Sais, Mal, Si L'amour Existe Encore, Main Dans La Main	Elvis Phương	Paris By Night 50	1999

Asia

NB	Song	With	Program	Year
1	Tình Trong Phút Giây (Ngọc Trọng)	solo	ASIA 4	1994
2	Một Ngày Vui Mùa Đông (Lê Uyên Phương)	solo	ASIA 6	1994
3	Huế Xưa (Anh Bằng)	solo	ASIA 10	1995
4	Có Những Niềm Riêng (Lê Tín Hương)	solo	ASIA 11	1996
5	LK Nhạc Pháp	Jo Marcel, Julie	ASIA 12	1996
6	Chiều Winnipeg (Trần Chí Phúc)	solo	ASIA 14	1997
7	Nếu Vắng Anh (Anh Bằng)	solo	ASIA 15	1997
8	Đêm Khuya Trên Đường Canita (Trần Văn Trạch)	solo	ASIA 18	1998
9	Thu Vàng (Cung Tiến)	solo	ASIA 20	1998
10	Người Ở Lại Charlie (Trần Thiện Thanh)	Duy Quang	ASIA 21	1998
11	Que Sera Sera	solo	ASIA 22	1998
12	Ngày Xưa Hoàng Thị (Phạm Duy)	solo	ASIA 23	1998
13	Bài Luân Vũ Mùa Mưa (LV:Trường Kỳ)	Elvis Phương	ASIA 26	1999
14	Hoa Soan Bên Thềm Cũ (Tuấn Khanh)	solo	ASIA 27	1999
15	Tưởng Như Còn Người Yêu (Phạm Duy)	solo	ASIA 29	2000
16	Biệt Khúc Cho Tình Nhân (Trầm Tử Thiêng)	solo	ASIA 30	2000
17	Hội Trùng Dương (Phạm Đình Chương)	Thanh Tuyền, Hoàng Oanh	ASIA 31	2000
18	Nhân Chứng	solo	ASIA 32	2001
19	Trầu Cau (Phan Huỳnh Điểu)	solo	ASIA 33	2001
20	Hòn Vọng Phu (Lê Thương)	Hoàng Oanh, Duy Quang	ASIA 34	2001
21	Vắng Bóng Người Yêu (LV: Phạm Duy)	solo	ASIA 35	2001
22	Hai Hàng Cây So Đũa (Nguyên Huy, Trọng Minh)	solo	ASIA 36	2002
23	LK Tình Yêu Và Tuổi Trẻ	Duy Quang	ASIA 37	2002
24	Mẹ Việt Nam Ơi! Chúng Con Vẫn Còn Đây (Việt Dzũng, Nguyệt Ánh)	Lê Uyên	ASIA 38	2002
25	Mưa Ngâu (Thanh Tùng)	Dạ Nhật Yến	ASIA 48	2005
26	Anh Không Chết Đâu Anh (Trần Thiện Thanh)	solo	ASIA 50	2006
27	LK Em Đi Rồi, Cho Em Quên Tuổi Ngọc (Lam Phương)	Diễm Liên	ASIA 51	2006
28	LK Đêm Nguyện Cầu, Nó, Một Ông Già (Lê Minh Bằng)	Trung Chỉnh, Chế Linh	ASIA 52	2006
29	LK Mộng Sầu, Hối Tiếc (Trầm Tử Thiêng)	Anh Khoa	ASIA 54	2007
30	LK Tình Yêu Ôi Tình Yêu, Búp bê không tình yêu	Doanh Doanh	ASIA 55	2007
31	LK Thôi, Ảo Ảnh (Y Vân)	Tuấn Vũ	ASIA 56	2007
32	Người Chết Trở Về (Trần Thiện Thanh)	Nhật Trường	ASIA 58	2008
33	LK Delilah, Je Sais, Mùa Tình Yêu, Một Thời Để Yêu	Paolo	ASIA 59	2008
34	Khúc Hát Thanh Xuân (LV: Phạm Duy)	Ngọc Hạ	ASIA 60	2008
35	Bà Mẹ Trị Thiên (Trần Thiện Thanh)	Vũ Khanh	ASIA 61	2009
36	LK Trả Lại Em Yêu, Em Hiền Như Masour (Phạm Duy)	Vũ Khanh	ASIA 65	2010
37	Kỷ Vật Cho Em (Phạm Duy)	Vũ Khanh	ASIA 66	2010
38	Nụ Tầm Xuân (Phạm Duy)	Vũ Khanh	ASIA 67	2010
39	Con Đường Tình Ta Đi (Phạm Duy)	Vũ Khanh	ASIA 68	2011
40	LK Nhạc Pháp: Maman (LV: Thanh Lan), La Vie, C'est Une Histoire D'Amour (LV: Lê Hựu Hà), Elle (LV: Duy Quang)	Sỹ Đan, Vũ Tuấn Đức	ASIA 71	2012
41	Lòng mẹ (Y Vân)	Lê Anh Quân	ASIA 72	2013
42	LK Nghẹn Ngào (Lam Phương), Anh Biết Em Đi Chẳng Trở Về (Anh Bằng, Thái Can)	Anh Khoa	ASIA 77	2015
43	Tuổi Biết Buồn (Phạm Duy, Ngọc Chánh)	solo	ASIA 78	2016
44	Xóm Đêm (Phạm Đình Chương)	solo	ASIA 82	2018
45	Giáng Sinh Phận Người (Lê Đức Long)	Loan Châu	ASIA Christmas Special 2020	2020

=== Stage ===
- Những người không chịu chết
- Mắc lưới
- Chiếc độc bình Khang Hy
- Người viễn khách thứ mười
- Chuyến tàu mang tên dục vọng (A Streetcar Named Desire)
- Đội lốt Việt kiều
- Tình nghệ sĩ
- Lá sầu riêng
- Lôi vũ
- Lồng đèn đỏ
- Đoạn tuyệt
- Sân khấu về khuya
- Phù Dung tự
- Công tử Bạc Liêu

=== Filmography ===
- Students Singing (Tiếng hát học trò, 1971) — ?
- Love (Yêu, 1971) — ?
- Tears of Stone (Lệ đá, 1971) — ?
- Ngọc Lan (Ngọc Lan, 1972) — Ngọc Lan
- The Flower Seller (Gánh hàng hoa, 1972) — ?
- On Winter's Peak (Trên đỉnh mùa đông, 1971) — Nguyễn Thị Lệ
- My Hamlet (Xóm tôi, 1973) — ?
- Don't Let Me Down (Xin đừng bỏ em, 1973) — ?
- My School (Trường tôi, 1973) — Thanh Lan
- Eternal Love of My Dream (Mộng Thường, 1974) — Nguyễn Thị Mộng Thường
- Number Ten Blues (第十藍調, 1974) — Lan
- Cards on the Table (Ván bài lật ngửa, 1984 - 1987) — Thùy Dung
- A Song Has Not Only Notes (Bài hát đâu chỉ là nốt nhạc, 1986) — Diệu Hương
- Suburb (Ngoại ô, 1987) — Huệ
- Two Sisters (Hai chị em, 1988) — Trúc
- Dept of the Crime (Chiều sâu tội ác, 1988) — ?
- Behind a Fate (Đằng sau một số phận, 1989) — Thục Nhàn
- Heaven for the Dancing Queen (Thiên đường cho cô gái nhảy, 1989) — ?
- Black Panther squad (Ba biên giới hay Biệt đội Hắc Báo, 1989) — ?
- Love Has No Borders (Tình không biên giới, 1990) — ?
- Across the Mist (Bên kia màn sương, 1990) — ?
- Human Companionship (Tình người, 1993) — Physician Trang
- Ghost Lover (Người yêu ma, 2007) — ?
- [...]

=== Voiceover ===
- Cards on the Table (Ván bài lật ngửa, 1982 - 1983) — Thùy Dung
- The Girl on the River (Cô gái trên sông, 1987) — Nguyệt

== See also ==
- Trần Quang
- Ngọc Lan
