= A Yank in Viet-Nam =

1964 film by Marshall Thompson

- Original film poster
- Directed by: Marshall Thompson
- Written by: Jack Lewis; Jane Wardell
- Story by: Jack Lewis
- Produced by: Wray Davis
- Starring: Marshall Thompson; Enrique Magalona; Mario Barri; Kieu Chinh
- Cinematography: Emmanuel I. Rojas
- Edited by: Orven Schanzer; Basil Wrangell
- Music by: Richard LaSalle
- Production company: Kingman Productions
- Distributed by: Allied Artists
- Release date: February 5, 1964 (US)
- Running time: 80 minutes
- Country: United States
- Languages: English; Vietnamese

A Yank in Viet-Nam is a 1964 war drama film. It was filmed entirely in South Vietnam during the Vietnam War.

== Plot ==
A pilot in the U.S. Marine Corps is shot down over the Vietnamese jungle. In his endeavor to get to safety, he meets a female guerrilla fighter (played by Kieu Chinh) and a nationalist named Hong.

== Cast ==
- Marshall Thompson as The Major
- Kieu Chinh as Herself
- Mario Barri as Hong
- Enrique Magalona as Guerrilla Leader

== Production ==
In addition to acting in the film, Marshall Thompson also served as the film's director. The screenplay is by Jane Wardell and Jack Lewis, based on a story by Lewis. The film was originally to be titled Year of the Tiger but in November 1963 it was retitled A Yank in Viet-Nam.

== See also ==
- List of American films of 1964
