= The Quiet American (1958 film) =

1958 film by Joseph L. Mankiewicz

- Theatrical release poster
- Directed by: Joseph L. Mankiewicz
- Screenplay by: Joseph L. Mankiewicz; Edward Lansdale (uncredited)
- Based on: The Quiet American; 1955 novel by Graham Greene
- Produced by: Joseph L. Mankiewicz (uncredited)
- Starring: Audie Murphy; Michael Redgrave; Claude Dauphin; Giorgia Moll
- Cinematography: Robert Krasker
- Edited by: William Hornbeck
- Music by: Mario Nascimbene
- Production company: Figaro
- Distributed by: United Artists
- Release date: February 5, 1958
- Running time: 122 minutes
- Country: United States
- Language: English
- Budget: $1.5 million

The Quiet American is a 1958 American drama romance thriller war film. It was the first film adaptation of Graham Greene's bestselling 1955 novel of the same name, and one of the first films to deal with the geo-politics of Indochina. It was written and directed by Joseph L. Mankiewicz, and stars Audie Murphy, Michael Redgrave, and Giorgia Moll. It was critically well-received, but was not considered a box-office success.

The film flips the plot of the novel on its head; it turns a cautionary tale about foreign intervention into an anticommunist advocacy of the use of American power abroad. In writing the script, Mankiewicz received uncredited input from CIA officer Edward Lansdale, who was often said to have been Greene’s inspiration for the American character he had called "Pyle" in the novel. (In the 1958 film, this character, though unnamed, was played by Murphy). However, in fact, Greene did not meet Lansdale until after completing much of the novel. According to Greene, the inspiration for the character of Pyle was Leo Hochstetter, an American serving as public affairs director for the Economic Aid Mission in Indochina who was assumed by the French to “belong to the CIA”; they had lectured him during the “long drive back to Saigon on the necessity of finding a 'third force in Vietnam.'"

The film stirred up controversy. Greene was furious that his anti-war message had been excised from the film, and he disavowed it as a "propaganda film for America."

The Quiet American was remade in 2002. That version, directed by Phillip Noyce and starring Brendan Fraser and Michael Caine, was more faithful to the plot of Greene's novel.

== Plot ==
In 1952 Saigon, the body of Alden Pyle, a young American, is found dead near a river during the Chinese New Year celebration. Thomas Fowler, a British journalist, had invited Pyle to his flat. Inspector Vigot, who is investigating the drowning murder of Pyle, interrogates Fowler, who declines to verify whether Pyle and Fowler's former Vietnamese lover, Phuong, were engaged. At a morgue, Fowler identifies the corpse is indeed Pyle. As Fowler recollects, a flashback occurs.

Months ago, Pyle had first met Fowler and Phuong inside a hotel lobby where they discuss the ongoing Indochina War. Pyle invites Fowler and Phuong to the Rendez-Vous restaurant where he dances with Phoung and meets her sister. A week later, Fowler travels up north as advised by his contact Dominguez. There, Fowler learns not only Pyle has allied with General Thé, a renegade commander leading the "Third Force", but that Pyle also intends to marry Phuong. Fowler himself is a married man, but cannot marry Phuong until he divorces his wife. When he leaves, Fowler receives a telegram from London, stating he has been promoted as a chief foreign editor.

Two weeks later, Fowler returns to Saigon and learns Pyle is importing plastics. At Fowler's flat, Pyle tells Phuong about his intent to marry her, with translation help from Fowler. When Pyle leaves, Fowler writes a letter to his wife, requesting a divorce. Days later, after Fowler and other journalists interview a Caodai military commander, he helps Pyle ride back to Saigon. When Fowler's car runs out of fuel, he and Pyle find shelter at a watchtower with two Vietnamese sentries. Before long, the watchtower is bombed by the Communists and Fowler is hit in the ankle as they hide under fire in a rice paddy.

As Fowler recovers, he reads his wife's letter, in which she refuses to divorce per her faith. He however lies to both Phuong and Pyle stating his wife has agreed to a divorce. Sometime later, Dominguez recommends Fowler to speak with Mr. Heng, a Chinese communist. Trusting Fowler's journalistic neutrality, Heng shows him materials containing "diolacton", an American trademarked plastic explosive. Meanwhile, at a restaurant, Pyle exposes Fowler for his lying. That same afternoon, Heng shows Fowler imported bicycle pumps that have been made from "diolacton". When Fowler returns to his flat, he discovers that Phuong has left him for Pyle.

Inside the city square, several bicycles explode, seriously injuring multiple people. Hours later, Heng tells Fowler to invite Pyle for dinner tonight. At his flat, Pyle reveals an influential Vietnamese he met at Princeton had sparked in his interest in Vietnam, whereby he believes his alliance with General Thé will ensure the nation becomes a republic. Pyle further adds he intends to leave with Phuong next week.

Back in the present, Fowler leaves the morgue and tells Phuong about Pyle's death. At Pyle's flat, Vigot has investigated that Fowler had indeed met Pyle that night, and his feelings for Phuong were manipulated by Dominguez and Mr. Heng, both of whom were agents of a Communist killing squad. The "diolacton" trademark is also revealed to have never existed. After Vigot leaves, Fowler finds a telegram, stating his wife has agreed to a divorce. Elevated, Fowler finds Phuong at the Rendez-Vous restaurant but she rejects him.

== Cast ==
- Audie Murphy as The American (Alden Pyle)
- Michael Redgrave as Thomas Fowler
- Claude Dauphin as Inspector Vigot
- Giorgia Moll as Phượng (secret name Phoenix)
- Bruce Cabot as Bill Granger
- Fred Sadoff as Dominguez
- Kerima as Phuong's sister
- Richard Loo as Mr. Hưng
- Peter Trent as Eliot Wilkins
- Georges Bréhat as French Colonel
- Clinton Anderson as Joe Morton
- Lê Quỳnh as a playboy

== Production ==
Filming of The Quiet American began in Saigon on January 28, 1957, then moved to Rome, where it finished in late April. It was the first time a feature film had been shot in Vietnam. The crew had some difficulty filming there: they had to avoid shooting at midday because of the harsh shadows; they had trouble getting permission to shoot inside a Buddhist temple because of religious scruples related to the phase of the moon; and they inadvertently helped a political protest take place that would otherwise have been shut down by the police, because the authorities assumed it had been staged for the film. In addition, filming was interrupted when Audie Murphy fell ill with appendicitis during a weekend shopping trip to Hong Kong and had to have emergency surgery.

It was reported that Humphrey Bogart had been considered for the lead role; in fact it was offered to Montgomery Clift, with Laurence Olivier set to play "Fowler". But Clift withdrew for health reasons, and Olivier then also left the project; Clift was replaced by Audie Murphy.

Graham Greene had been a war correspondent in Indochina, and was critical of the growing American involvement there. Joseph L. Mankiewicz, the writer, director, and producer of the film, significantly diluted the political impact of Greene's story by making the character of Pyle an aid worker and private citizen rather than a representative of the American government, and by focusing on the love-triangle aspects of the story rather than the geo-politics of the war. These changes led Greene to disavow the film. He stated that "one could almost believe that the film was made deliberately to attack the book and the author".

The character of Phuong, a young Vietnamese woman, was portrayed by Italian actress Giorgia Moll.

Audie Murphy said that he never would have participated in the movie if the story's tone had not been changed from anti-American to pro-American, and he called his part "one of the greatest I've ever had".

== Critical response ==
Bosley Crowther of The New York Times noted Mankiewicz had removed "the anti-American venom" from Green's novel. Nevertheless, he complimented the performances of the cast, and felt the "[s]cenes shot in the streets of Saigon have a vivid documentary quality and, indeed, the whole film has an aroma of genuine friction in the seething Orient." Philip K. Scheuer of the Los Angeles Times praised the film, likening it to "Judaslike tragedy, on an intellectual level, if you will—but brilliantly intellectual. The dialogue crackles like the Chinese New Year during which the drama unfolds. Yet despite the protracted spoken passages the film is always cinematic, steeped in the exotic atmosphere of Viet-Nam, where it was shot." Time magazine deplored the deviations from the novel, but acknowledged "the picture is well worth seeing for the buildup that precedes it. Mankiewicz is an intelligent director, and he keeps his actors on the jump and his story on the move."

Variety wrote the film was "an overlong, overdialogued adaptation, concerning itself with the pros and cons with a Third Force in Asia and playing scant lip service to one of the old adage that one of the most basic appeals of the motion picture is that it moves." Harrison's Reports similarly observed the film "subjects the spectator to incessant talk throughout its overlong two-hour running time, and mitigating against its acceptance by the rank-and-file movie-goers is the fact that the talk is mostly ideological ... Dramatically, its impact is ineffectual." A review in the Chicago Tribune wrote: "The general tone of the Graham Greene novel, which many people considered anti-American, has been considerably softened in the film version, though a note of acerbity, some of it deserved, still remains [...] As that gentleman, Audie Murphy is in a pretty fast league as far as acting is concerned—Michael Redgrave and Claude Dauphin are a pair of skilled veterans, and while Audie is well cast, they outshine him."

New York Daily News critic Kate Cameron wrote that "the trouble with the picture is that the audience is never let into the secret heart of the matter, as Greene himself would say. The dialogue is cryptic and the action is muffled in mystery. The Pittsburgh Sun-Telegraph praised the performances as "real and sincere" but said that Murphy was an "occasional exception," as his character at times was "not quite plausible."
