= Huỳnh Anh =

Vietnamese cyclist

Personal information
- Born: 16 October 1932 (age 93)
- Height: 165 cm (5 ft 5 in)
- Weight: 55 kg (121 lb)

Cycling career
- Sport: Cycling
- Disciplines: Road; Track
- Role: Rider
- Rider type: Endurance

Huỳnh Anh (born 16 October 1932) is a former Vietnamese road and track cyclist during the 1950s and 1960s.

== Career ==
Anh was one of the four Vietnamese cyclists at the 1957 Merdeka Games in Malaysia where he competed in the 25-mile race around the Lake Gardens, Kuala Lumpur.

He competed in the team time trial at the 1964 Summer Olympics in Tokyo.
