= Number Ten Blues =

2013 film directed by Norio Osada

Number Ten Blues ナンバーテン・ブルース さらばサイゴン Tình-khúc thứ mười
- Film poster
- Directed by: Norio Osada; Lưu Bạch Đàn
- Written by: Norio Osada
- Produced by: Shōichi Amino
- Starring: Yūsuke Kawazu; Thanh Lan
- Cinematography: Shiizuka Akira
- Edited by: Ohashi Nobuyo
- Music by: Toshiaki Tsushima
- Distributed by: Presario Corporation; NHK
- Release date: 2013
- Running time: 97 minutes
- Countries: Japan; South Vietnam
- Languages: Japanese; Vietnamese; English

Number Ten Blues (Japanese: ナンバーテン・ブルース さらばサイゴン, Chinese: 第十藍調, Vietnamese: Đệ-thập lam-điệu) or Goodbye Saigon (Japanese: サヨナラ・サイゴン, Chinese: 告别西貢, Vietnamese: Giã-biệt Sài-gòn) is a 1975 Japanese 35mm Fujicolor film directed by Norio Osada. This movie, shot between December 1974 and April 1975, remained unfinished and was considered lost for many years. It was finally completed and released in 2013.

== Plot ==
Saigon in February 1975, during the final stage of the Vietnam War, there is another story of love and violence. Japanese businessman Sugimoto (Yūsuke Kawazu) accidentally kills a Vietnamese man. He loses all title and social status that supported his wealthy position in Vietnam. He decides to escape from Vietnam. He heads North on the military road under battle conditions, with his lover, Lan (Thanh Lan), and Taro (Kenji Isomura), who is the half-blood son of an ex-Japanese soldier and a Vietnamese woman since World War II. Who knows what awaits them: is it liberation or total catastrophe?

The 20th-century was marked by war and turbulence. As the Vietnam War sunk deeper into morass, another story of love and violence played out. Japanese were ecstatic to be thought of at the time as 'No. 1' in the world. By contrast, 'No. 10' signaled the opposite meaning.

== Production ==
=== Art ===
- Type : Action, adventure, crime, mystery, suspense
- Studio : Presario Corporation
- Music : Toshiaki Tsushima
- Theme song Paces of the rosy love (Bước tình hồng) by Nguyễn Trung Cang, with Thanh Lan's singing

=== Cast ===
- Yūsuke Kawazu ... Toshio Sugimoto - Japanese businessman
- Thanh Lan ... Lan - Saigonnese singer
- Kenji Isomura ... Taro - Sugimoto's partner
- Tú Trinh ... Hạnh
- Hidekazu Kikuchi ... Ota
- Eiichi Kikuchi
- Cao Huỳnh ... Huân
- Đoàn Châu Mậu ... Trần - Godfather
- Bảo Lâm
- Tùng Lâm

== Awards ==
- 24 January 2013 : International Film Festival Rotterdam
- 2 August 2013 : Fantasia International Film Festival
- 14 September 2013 : Fukuoka International Film Festival
- 5 October 2013 : War on Screen International Film Festival
- 15 November 2013 : Osaka European Film Festival
- 23 March 2014 : Offscreen Film Festival
- 12 April 2014 : Anaheim Viet Film Fest
- 30 May 2014 : Frankfurt Nippon Connection Festival

== Reception ==
This never-shown film was found in the basement of the National Film Center in Tokyo. Completely shot in Vietnam over 850 kilometers in the midst of the war. Location is Huế, Hải Vân Gorge, Road No. 1, Long Hải and Saigon.

== See also ==
- Fall of Saigon
- Vietnam War
