= Lê Quỳnh =

Vietnamese actor (1934–2008)

- Born: 6 September 1934; Hanoi, Tonkin, French Indochina
- Died: 5 January 2008 (aged 73); Los Angeles, California, U.S.
- Occupations: Actor; producer
- Years active: 1957–2008

Lê Quỳnh (6 September 1934 – 5 January 2008) was a Vietnamese film actor before 1975. He was one of the first actors of Vietnamese cinema.

== Life ==
Le Quynh was born on 6 September 1934 in Hanoi. He migrated to the South in 1954 and began his film career through his role in the film We Want to Live by director Vinh Noan. After the film, his name began to rise in the Vietnamese cinema industry. In 1957, he participated in the film The Bell of Thien Mu with actress Kieu Chinh. The film was based on the novel by Phan Tran Chuc, directed by Le Dan, produced by Tan Viet Dien Anh company of Bùi Diễm. The music was composed by two musicians Nguyen Huu Ba and Pham Duy. He then played the main role in the films Rain Forest, Old Eyes, Underground Trap, Last Autumn. In the film Underground Trap by director Le Hoang Hoa, Le Quynh won the "Best Actor" award.

In 1966, Le Quynh represented Vietnam at the Asian Film Festival in Seoul, South Korea and won two awards at the Festival. In 1967, Le Quynh also attended the International Film Festival in Berlin, Germany. This time, he was invited to become an honorary member of the International Film Actors' Union.

He married his first wife, the famous singer Thái Thanh, and had five children. Two of his daughters are singers, Ý Lan and Quỳnh Hương. He remarried his second wife and had four children. He died on 5 January 2008, in Los Angeles, California, at the age of 73.

== Filmography ==
- Chúng tôi muốn sống (1956)
- Bụi phấn hồng
- Bẫy ngầm
- Chờ người
- Đôi mắt người xưa
- Hồi chuông thiên mụ (1957)
- Mưa rừng
- Mùa thu cuối cùng
- Ngàn năm mây bay
- Từ Sài Gòn đến Điện Biên Phủ
- Tổ Đặc Công 13
- Hoà-Bình (1970)

== See also ==
- Anh Tứ
- Trần Phương
- La Thoại Tân
