= Tây Nha Trang =

Tây Nha Trang Phường Tây Nha Trang
- Ward
- Interactive map of Tây Nha Trang
- Coordinates: 12°16′34″N 109°09′54″E
- Country: Vietnam
- Province: Khánh Hòa province
- Established: June 16, 2025

Area
  - Total: 10.77 sq mi (27.89 km^{2})

Population (2024)
  - Total: 108,065
  - Density: 10,040/sq mi (3,875/km^{2})
- Time zone: UTC+07:00 (Indochina Time)
- Administrative code: 22390

Tây Nha Trang (Vietnamese: Phường Tây Nha Trang, lit. 'West Nha Trang') is a ward of Khánh Hòa province, Vietnam. It is one of the 65 new wards, communes and special zones of the province following the reorganization in 2025.

== History ==
On June 16, 2025, the National Assembly Standing Committee issued Resolution No. 1667/NQ-UBTVQH15 on the arrangement of commune-level administrative units of Khánh Hòa province in 2025 (effective from June 16, 2025). Accordingly, the entire land area and population of Ngọc Hiệp, Phương Sài wards and Vĩnh Ngọc, Vĩnh Thạnh, Vĩnh Hiệp, Vĩnh Trung communes of the former Nha Trang city will be integrated into a new ward named Tây Nha Trang (Clause 51, Article 1).
