= Anh Do =

Australian author, actor and comedian

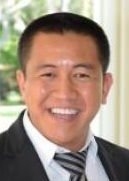
- Do in 2011
- Born: 2 June 1977 (age 49); Ho Chi Minh City, Vietnam
- Occupations: Actor; Stand-up comedian; Author
- Spouse: Suzanne Do
- Children: 4
- Relatives: Khoa Do (brother)
- Website: anhdo.com

Anh Do (born 2 June 1977) is an Australian author, actor, comedian, and painter. He has appeared on Australian television shows such as Thank God You're Here and Good News Week, and was runner-up on Dancing with the Stars in 2007. He studied a combined Business Law degree at the University of Technology, Sydney. He is the brother of film director Khoa Do and has acted in several of Khoa's films, including Footy Legends, which he co-wrote and produced. In 2012, his TV show Anh Does Vietnam began airing. He has been four times a finalist in the Archibald Prize and won the 2017 People's Choice Award. From 2016 to 2021, Do hosted Anh's Brush with Fame on ABC TV in which he concurrently interviews and paints a portrait of prominent Australians.

== Early life ==
Anh Do was born in Ho Chi Minh City, Vietnam. Do and his family fled to Australia as refugees in 1980. In his 2010 autobiography, The Happiest Refugee, Do tells of how his family survived five days in a leaky fishing boat nine and a half metres long and two metres wide. During the trip his family and the rest of the passengers were attacked by two different bands of pirates. The first group stole one of the two engines and the second group of pirates stole the second engine, which had been broken but repaired by Do's father using a piece of rubber from a thong. It was reported that as the second band of pirates left, one of them threw a gallon of water onboard which kept all but one of the refugees alive, until they were finally rescued by a German merchant ship. The boat was packed with 40 Vietnamese refugees fleeing across the Indian Ocean.

Do's family settled in the Sydney suburb of Yagoona. Do attended St Aloysius' College in Milsons Point for his secondary education. When he was 14 he started a small business breeding tropical fish. While studying his first year of law at the University of Technology, Sydney, he owned a stall which sold American Indian artifacts, which he later expanded to four franchised stores.

== Career ==
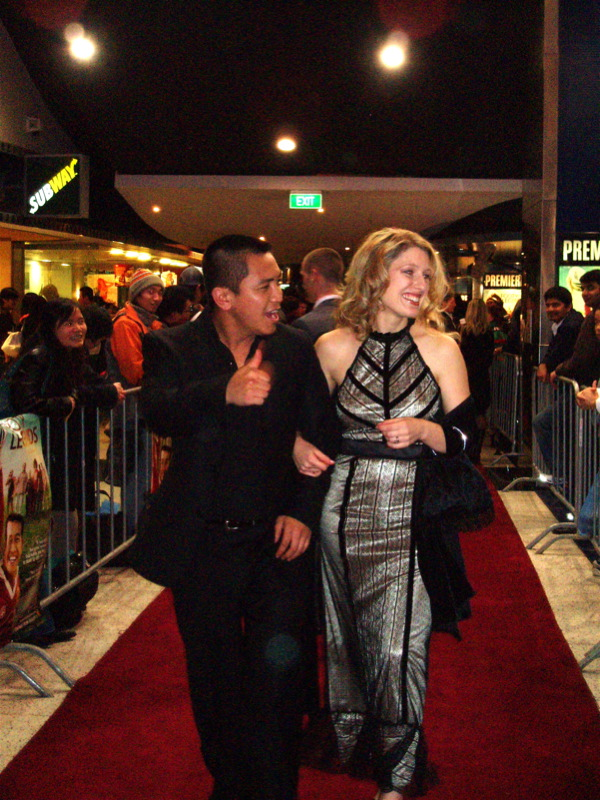
Do with wife Suzanne in 2005, walking the red carpet at the premiere of Footy Legends

Six months before finishing his combined Business Law degree, law firms offered him jobs which required 60 hours of work a week. He opted to take up stand-up comedy instead.

Do's memoir The Happiest Refugee has won awards, including the 2011 Australian Book of the Year, Biography of the Year and Newcomer of the Year, as well as the Indie Book of the Year Award 2011, Non-fiction Indie Book of the Year 2011, and it was shortlisted for the 2011 NSW Premier's Literary Awards, Community Relations Commission Award.

Since 2013, Do has cut back on comedy to focus on painting full-time. He was a finalist in the Archibald Prize in 2014, 2017, 2019 and 2022. From 2016 to 2021, Do hosted Anh's Brush with Fame on ABC TV. In this popular program, Anh Do concurrently interviews and paints a portrait of prominent Australians. He has been criticised for pre-painting the portraits from photographs and enlisting help from his art tutor.

== Personal life ==
Do is married to Suzanne (Suzie) Do and they have three sons and a daughter. Do met Suzie whilst they were both studying at university. His mother, Hien, played the role of Van Nguyen's mother, Kim, in Better Man, a film which was produced by Anh's brother Khoa Do.

== Awards ==
- 2011 Independent Booksellers Book of the Year (for The Happiest Refugee)
- 2011 Joint winner (with musician Paul Kelly) of the Biography of the Year (for The Happiest Refugee)
- 2011 Best Newcomer (for The Happiest Refugee)
- 2011 Book of the Year (for The Happiest Refugee)
- 2017 People's Choice Award, Archibald Prize (for portrait of Jack Charles)
- 2024 Young Australian Best Book Award for Fiction for younger readers (for Hot Dog #10: Beach Time!, illustrated by Dan McGuiness)

=== Mo Awards ===
The Australian Entertainment Mo Awards (commonly known informally as the Mo Awards), were annual Australian entertainment industry awards. They recognise achievements in live entertainment in Australia from 1975 to 2016. Anh Do won one award in that time.

Year	Nominee / work	Award	Result (wins only)
2012	Anh Do	Rodney Rude Stand Up Comedian of the Year	Won

== Filmography ==
Year	Title	Role	Notes
	The NRL Footy Show	Himself	Comedian
	Short and Curley	Host	
2000	SeaChange	Quan Tho	
2002	Don't Blame Me	Vinnie	
2003	All Saints	Tim Salter	Episode: "The Devil to Pay"
2003	The Finished People	Factory Worker	
2005	Little Fish	Tran	
2005	Blue Water High	Robbo	Episode: "It's Hard to Be Normal"
2005-2007	Pizza	Chong Fat	
2006	Two Twisted	Paramedic	
2006	Solo	Nguyen	
2006	Footy Legends	Luc Vu	
2006 & 2007	Thank God You're Here	Himself	Improvised comedy series Contestant
2007	Kick	Hoa Tran	
2007	Dancing with the Stars	Contestant	Reality television series
2007	Deal or No Deal	Contestant	Reality television series Celebrity special Won maximum prize of $200,000
2008	Crooked Business	Benny Wing	
2008	Double the Fist	Krakbot	
2008	Made in China	Host	
2009	The Squiz	Host	Game show television series
2009	Top Gear Australia	Guest	Motoring reality television series
2010	Matty Johns Show	Himself	Anh Can Do segment
2010	Talking Heads	Guest	Series 6, Episode 33
2012	Pictures of You	Guest	Talk show
2012-2014	Anh Does	Host	Travel and lifestyle television series
2014-2016	Long Lost Family (Australia)	Co-host	Documentary series
2016-2021	Anh's Brush with Fame	Host	Talk show

== Books ==
=== Series ===
==== WeirDo ====
Year	No.	Title	Publisher	ISBN	Notes
2013	1.	WeirDo	Scholastic Australia	9781742837581	Illustrated by Jules Faber
2014	2.	Even Weirder!	Scholastic Australia	9781743622711	Illustrated by Jules Faber
2014	3.	Extra Weird	Scholastic Australia	9781743627051	Illustrated by Jules Faber
2015	4.	Super Weird!	Scholastic Australia	9781743629314	Illustrated by Jules Faber
2015	5.	Totally Weird!	Scholastic Australia	9781760155346	Illustrated by Jules Faber
2016	6.	Crazy Weird!	Scholastic Australia	9781760159085	Illustrated by Jules Faber
2016	7.	Mega Weird!	Scholastic Australia	9781760159092	Illustrated by Jules Faber
2017	8.	Really Weird!	Scholastic Australia	9781760276768	Illustrated by Jules Faber
2017	9.	Spooky Weird!	Scholastic Australia	9781760276775	Illustrated by Jules Faber
2018	10.	Messy Weird!	Scholastic Australia	9781742768045	Illustrated by Jules Faber
2018	11.	Splashy Weird!	Scholastic Australia	9781742993751	Illustrated by Jules Faber
2019
2019	12.	Hopping Weird!	Scholastic Australia	9781742997926	Illustrated by Jules Faber
2019	13.	Weirdomania!	Scholastic Australia	9781742997933	Illustrated by Jules Faber
2020	14.	Vote Weirdo	Scholastic Australia	9781743836668	Illustrated by Jules Faber
2020	15.	Planet Weird	Scholastic Australia	9781743836675	Illustrated by Jules Faber
2021
2021	16.	Tasty Weird!	Scholastic Australia	9781760974657	Illustrated by Jules Faber
2021	17.	Spinning Weird	Scholastic Australia	9781760979027	Illustrated by Jules Faber
2022	18.	Weird History!	Scholastic Australia	9781761127397	Illustrated by Jules Faber
2022	19.	Cheesy Weird!	Scholastic Australia	9781761127403	Illustrated by Jules Faber
2023	20.	Forever Weird!	Scholastic Australia	9781761202964	Illustrated by Jules Faber
2023	21.	Weird Wedding!	Scholastic Australia	9781761290503	Illustrated by Jules Faber
2024	22.	Weird Holiday!	Scholastic Australia	9781760266059	Illustrated by Jules Faber
2024	23.	Funny Weird!	Scholastic Australia	9781760266066	Illustrated by Jules Faber
2025	24.	Weird Power!	Scholastic Australia	9781761528897	Illustrated by Jules Faber
2025	25.	Weird Star!	Scholastic Australia	9781761528927	Illustrated by Jules Faber
2026	26.	Weird Rescue!	Scholastic Australia	9781761648458	Illustrated by Jules Faber
2026	27.	Weirdest Ever!	Scholastic Australia	9781761648496	Illustrated by Jules Faber

==== Hotdog! ====
Year	No.	Title	Publisher	ISBN	Notes
2016	1.	HotDog!	Scholastic Australia	9781760279004	Illustrated by Dan McGuiness
2017	2.	Party Time!	Scholastic Australia	9781760279011	Illustrated by Dan McGuiness
2017	3.	Circus Time!	Scholastic Australia	9781760279028	Illustrated by Dan McGuiness
2018	4.	Game Time!	Scholastic Australia	9781760279035	Illustrated by Dan McGuiness
2018	5.	Camping Time!	Scholastic Australia	9781742993768	Illustrated by Dan McGuiness
2019	6.	Movie Time!	Scholastic Australia	9781742997872	Illustrated by Dan McGuiness
2019	7.	Show Time!	Scholastic Australia	9781742997889	Illustrated by Dan McGuiness
2020	8.	Art Time!	Scholastic Australia	9781743836521	Illustrated by Dan McGuiness
2020	9.	Snow Time!	Scholastic Australia	9781743836538	Illustrated by Dan McGuiness
2021	10.	Beach Time!	Scholastic Australia	9781743837528	Illustrated by Dan McGuiness
2021	11.	Tool Time!	Scholastic Australia	9781760979102	Illustrated by Dan McGuiness
2022	12.	Lolly Time!	Scholastic Australia	9781760979119	Illustrated by Dan McGuiness
2022	13.	Soccer Time!	Scholastic Australia	9781761127410	Illustrated by Dan McGuiness
2023	14.	Tidy Time!	Scholastic Australia	9781761127427	Illustrated by Dan McGuiness
2023	15.	Toy Time!	Scholastic Australia	9781761202971	Illustrated by Dan McGuiness
2024	16.	Garden Time!	Scholastic Australia	9781761290497	Illustrated by Dan McGuiness
2024	17.	Scary Time!	Scholastic Australia	9781760266073	Illustrated by Dan McGuiness
2025	18.	Robot Time!	Scholastic Australia	9781760266080	Illustrated by Dan McGuiness
2025	19.	Detective Time!	Scholastic Australia	9781761528941	Illustrated by Dan McGuiness
2026	20.	Puzzle Time!	Scholastic Australia	9781761528996	Illustrated by Dan McGuiness
2026	21.	Island Time!	Scholastic Australia	9781761810886	Upcoming publication Illustrated by Dan McGuiness

==== Ninja Kid ====
Year	No.	Title	Publisher	ISBN	Notes
2018	1.	From Nerd to Ninja!	Scholastic Australia	9781742993263	Illustrated by Jeremy Ley
2018	2.	Flying Ninja!	Scholastic Australia	9781742999579	Illustrated by Jeremy Ley
2019	3.	Ninja Switch!	Scholastic Australia	9781760662820	Illustrated by Jeremy Ley
2019	4.	Amazing Ninja!	Scholastic Australia	9781760662837	Illustrated by Jeremy Ley
2020	5.	Ninja Clones!	Scholastic Australia	9781743835128	Illustrated by Anton Emdin
2020	6.	Ninja Giants!	Scholastic Australia	9781743835135	Illustrated by Anton Emdin
2021	7.	Ninja Toys!	Scholastic Australia	9781760974664	Illustrated by Anton Emdin
2021	8.	Ninja Dogs!	Scholastic Australia	9781760979126	Illustrated by Anton Emdin
2022	9.	Ninja Fish!	Scholastic Australia	9781761120480	Illustrated by Anton Emdin
2022	10.	Ninja Heroes!	Scholastic Australia	9781761120497	Illustrated by Anton Emdin
2023	11.	Ninja Artists!	Scholastic Australia	9781761202445	Illustrated by Anton Emdin
2023	12.	Hypno Ninja!	Scholastic Australia	9781761202452	Illustrated by Anton Emdin
2024	13.	Ninja Games!	Scholastic Australia	9781761290510	Illustrated by Anton Emdin
2024	14.	Ninja Buddies!	Scholastic Australia	9781761290527	Illustrated by Anton Emdin
2025	15.	Ninja Talent!	Scholastic Australia	9781761296420	Illustrated by Mario Gonzales
2025	16.	Ninja Rewind!	Scholastic Australia	9781761296437	Illustrated by Mario Gonzales
2026	17.	Invisible Ninja!	Scholastic Australia	9781761528989	Illustrated by Mario Gonzales
2026	18.	Ninja Fright!	Scholastic Australia	9781761642425	Illustrated by Mario Gonzales

==== Rise of the Mythix ====
Year	No.	Title	Publisher	ISBN	Notes
2019	1.	Golden Unicorn	Allen & Unwin	9781760525132	Illustrated by Chris Wahl
2020	2.	Mighty Minotaur	Allen & Unwin	9781760876401	Illustrated by Chris Wahl
2021	3.	Flight of the Griffin	Allen & Unwin	9781760876418	Illustrated by Chris Wahl
2021	4.	Legends Unite	Allen & Unwin	9781760879068	Illustrated by Chris Wahl
2022	5.	The Last Gladiator	Allen & Unwin	9781761065682	Illustrated by Marcelo Baez

==== Wolf Girl ====
Year	No.	Title	Publisher	ISBN	Notes
2019	1.	Into the Wild	Allen & Unwin	9781760525095	Illustrated by Jeremy Ley
2019	2.	The Great Escape	Allen & Unwin	9781760876357	Illustrated by Jeremy Ley
2020	3.	The Secret Cave	Allen & Unwin	9781760876371	Illustrated by Lachlan Creagh
2020	4.	The Traitor	Allen & Unwin	9781760877866	Illustrated by Lachlan Creagh
2021
2021	5.	Across the Sea	Allen & Unwin	9781760879044	Illustrated by Lachlan Creagh
2021	6.	Animal Train	Allen & Unwin	9781760879051	Illustrated by Lachlan Creagh
2022	7.	Crash Course	Allen & Unwin	9781761065644	Illustrated by Lachlan Creagh
2022	8.	Welcome to Paradise	Allen & Unwin	9781761065651	Illustrated by Lachlan Creagh
2023	9.	Sink or Swim	Allen & Unwin	9781761068911	Illustrated by Lachlan Creagh
2023	10.	The Race Is on	Allen & Unwin	9781761068973	Illustrated by Lachlan Creagh
2024	11.	Hide and Seek	Allen & Unwin	9781761189388	Illustrated by Lachlan Creagh
2024	12.	Shadows and Secrets	Allen & Unwin	9781761069956	Illustrated by Jeremy Ley
2025	13.	New Friends	Allen & Unwin	9781761181641	Illustrated by Jeremy Ley
2025	14.	The Break In	Allen & Unwin	9781761182259	Illustrated by Jeremy Ley
2026	15.	Hunted	Allen & Unwin	9781761182815	Illustrated by Chris Wahl
2026	16.	Under Water	Allen & Unwin	9781761182822	Upcoming publication Illustrated by Chris Wahl

==== E-Boy ====
Year	No.	Title	Publisher	ISBN	Notes
2020	1.	E-Boy	Allen & Unwin	9781760877521	Illustrated by Chris Wahl
2021	2.	Robofight	Allen & Unwin	9781760877859	Illustrated by Chris Wahl
2021	3.	Enter the Jungle	Allen & Unwin	9781760879020	Illustrated by Chris Wahl
2022	4.	A New Gemini	Allen & Unwin	9781760879037	Illustrated by Tim McEwen
2023	5.	Superhuman Army	Allen & Unwin	9781760879037	Illustrated by Marcelo Baez

==== Skydragon ====
Year	No.	Title	Publisher	ISBN	Notes
2020	1.	Skydragon	Allen & Unwin	9781760876364	Illustrated by James Hart
2021	2.	Fly Free	Allen & Unwin	9781760876425	Illustrated by James Hart
2021	3.	Ride the Wind	Allen & Unwin	9781760879013	Illustrated by James Hart
2022	4.	Brave the Storm	Allen & Unwin	9781761065606	Illustrated by James Hart
2022	5.	Wave Breaker	Allen & Unwin	9781761065613	Illustrated by James Hart
2023	6.	Rescue Flight	Allen & Unwin	9781761068904	Illustrated by James Hart
2023	7.	Firestorm	Allen & Unwin	9781761068942	Illustrated by James Hart
2024	8.	Scorpion's Curse	Allen & Unwin	9781761069840	Illustrated by James Hart

==== Pow Pow Pig ====
Year	No.	Title	Publisher	ISBN	Notes
2021	1.	An Unexpected Hero	Allen & Unwin	9781760526405	Illustrated by Peter Cheong
2022	2.	Let the Games Begin	Allen & Unwin	9781761065194	Illustrated by Peter Cheong
2022	3.	On the High Seas	Allen & Unwin	9781761065675	Illustrated by Peter Cheong
2023	4.	Loch Ness Adventure	Allen & Unwin	9781761068867	Illustrated by Peter Cheong
2023	5.	Snow Action	Allen & Unwin	9781761068928	Illustrated by Peter Cheong
2024	6.	Forest Secrets	Allen & Unwin	9781761069833	Illustrated by Peter Cheong

==== Smarty Pup ====
Year	No.	Title	Publisher	ISBN	Notes
2022	1.	Friends Fur-ever	Allen & Unwin	9781760526399	Illustrated by Anton Emdin
2023	2.	JJ and the Giant Panther	Allen & Unwin	9781761068720	Illustrated by Anton Emdin
2023	3.	To the Rescue	Allen & Unwin	9781761068959	Illustrated by Anton Emdin
2024	4.	Talent Quest	Allen & Unwin	9781761069857	Illustrated by Anton Emdin
2025	5.	Time to Fly	Allen & Unwin	9781761069932	Illustrated by Anton Emdin

==== Champ ====
Year	No.	Title	Publisher	ISBN	Notes
2022	1.	The Champ	Allen & Unwin	9781760526870	Illustrated by Dave Atze
2022	2.	Rock 'n' Roll	Allen & Unwin	9781761065620	Illustrated by Dave Atze
2023	3.	The Champ vs the Werewolf Warriorz	Allen & Unwin	9781761065637	Illustrated by Dave Atze

==== Kung Fu Roo ====
Year	No.	Title	Publisher	ISBN	Notes
2024	1.	Enter the Roo	Allen & Unwin	9781761069918	Illustrated by Jeremy Ley
2025	2.	Crouching Kanga, Hidden Hippo!	Allen & Unwin	9781761181726	Illustrated by Jeremy Ley

==== Ninja Girl ====
Year	No.	Title	Publisher	ISBN	Notes
2025	1.	Ninja Girl	Scholastic Australia	9781760264949	Illustrated by James Hart
2025	2.	Ninja Superstars!	Scholastic Australia	9781760269050	Illustrated by James Hart
2026	3.	Running Wild!	Scholastic Australia	9781760269067	Illustrated by James Hart
2026	4.	Dog Show!	Scholastic Australia	9781761723827	Illustrated by James Hart

==== Dolphin Twins ====
Year	No.	Title	Publisher	ISBN	Notes
2025	1.	Lost Island	Scholastic Australia	9781761723773	Illustrated by Tegan Clancy
2026	2.	Wave Riders	Scholastic Australia	9781761726422	Illustrated by James Hart
2026	3.	Shipwreck Bay	Scholastic Australia	9781761813740	Illustrated by James Hart

=== Standalone works ===
Year	Title	Publisher	ISBN	Notes
2010	The Happiest Refugee	Allen & Unwin	9781742372389	
2011	The Little Refugee	Allen & Unwin	9781742378329	Picture book Co-authored with Suzanne Do; Illustrated by Bruce Whatley
2016	What Do They do with all the Poo from all the Animals at the Zoo?	Scholastic Australia	9781760264475	Picture book Illustrated by Laura Wood
