= VIFF =

VIFF may refer to:

- Vancouver International Film Festival
- Vienna Independent Film Festival
- Vietnamese International Film Festival
- Vilnius International Film Festival
- Vectoring in forward flight, a term used in relation to the Hawker Siddeley Harrier and its derivatives
