= Up and Down the Dust Way =

2002 film by Linh Nga

Xuoi nguoc duong tran
- Directed by: Linh Nga(a.k.a. Lina Nga Nguyen); Tuan Anh Nguyen
- Produced by: Vietnam Television
- Starring: Linh Nga; Mai Ngoc Can; The Tuc; Kim Xuyen
- Cinematography: The Manh
- Music by: Dang Huu Phuc
- Release date: 21 February 2002
- Running time: 210 minutes
- Country: Vietnam
- Language: Vietnamese

Up and Down the Dust Way (Vietnamese: Xuôi ngược đường trần) is a 2002 Vietnamese television series, written and directed by Linh Nga (a.k.a. Lina Linh Nga) and co-directed by Tuan Anh Nguyen. It starred Linh Nga, Mai Ngoc Can, The Tuc, and Kim Xuyen. It premiered on February 21, 2002, at the Vietnamese International Film Festival in Hanoi, Vietnam. It won the Academy International Award for Best television Series of 2002. It was shown on May 27, 2002, in Hanoi, Ho Chi Minh City, and other cities.

== Plot ==
The series is set in the 1990s in Vietnam. Lien is a traditional, pure, and simple Vietnamese girl who has a dream of a happy, peaceful life. The opening describes a series of traumatic events that happened to her when she was a young child: Her mother died and her father remarried a wicked woman. In a desperate effort to escape, Lien meets up with the Master. Under his tutelage, she regains hope. At the end, she finds the answer to her questions: "Patience is a bridge to overcome suffering."

== Cast and characters ==
- Linh Nga as Lien — The Vietnamese protagonist, who is young and kind-hearted and must overcome various opposing forces. She tells viewers about her life in an abusive, dysfunctional family.
- The Tuc as Master — A man who has devoted his life to Buddhism. He is the catalyst for Lien's existential questions: What is the purpose of life? How can one avoid physical and emotional suffering?"
- Kim Xuyen as Stepmother — A nightmarish, devillish stepmother. She is the main reason for Lien's father's death and serves as a foil for Lien.

== Production ==
Xuoi nguoc duong tran was shot for 70 days in Vietnam, where the local film industry is still developing. The cast and crew had to deal with a number of obstacles, including crew members who got sick, paperwork, actors who were injured, a limited budget, and the prejudices of some Vietnamese people against the director, Linh Nga, because she was a woman and only 20 years old. Another challenge was travelling across Vietnam to film the Sóc Trăng pagoda scenes.

Parts of the film, mainly Buddhist scenes near the end, were shot in the ancient temples of Sóc Trăng.

== Themes ==
Xuoi nguoc duong tran sought to recover the voices of Vietnamese women. Its creators cast a wide net in their effort to share, understand, and include women's experiences, points of view, and positions in traditional Vietnamese life. Most importantly, the series sought answers to the question of how to overcome suffering in life.

== Honours and awards ==
- VIFF 2002
