= Linh Nga =

American film director

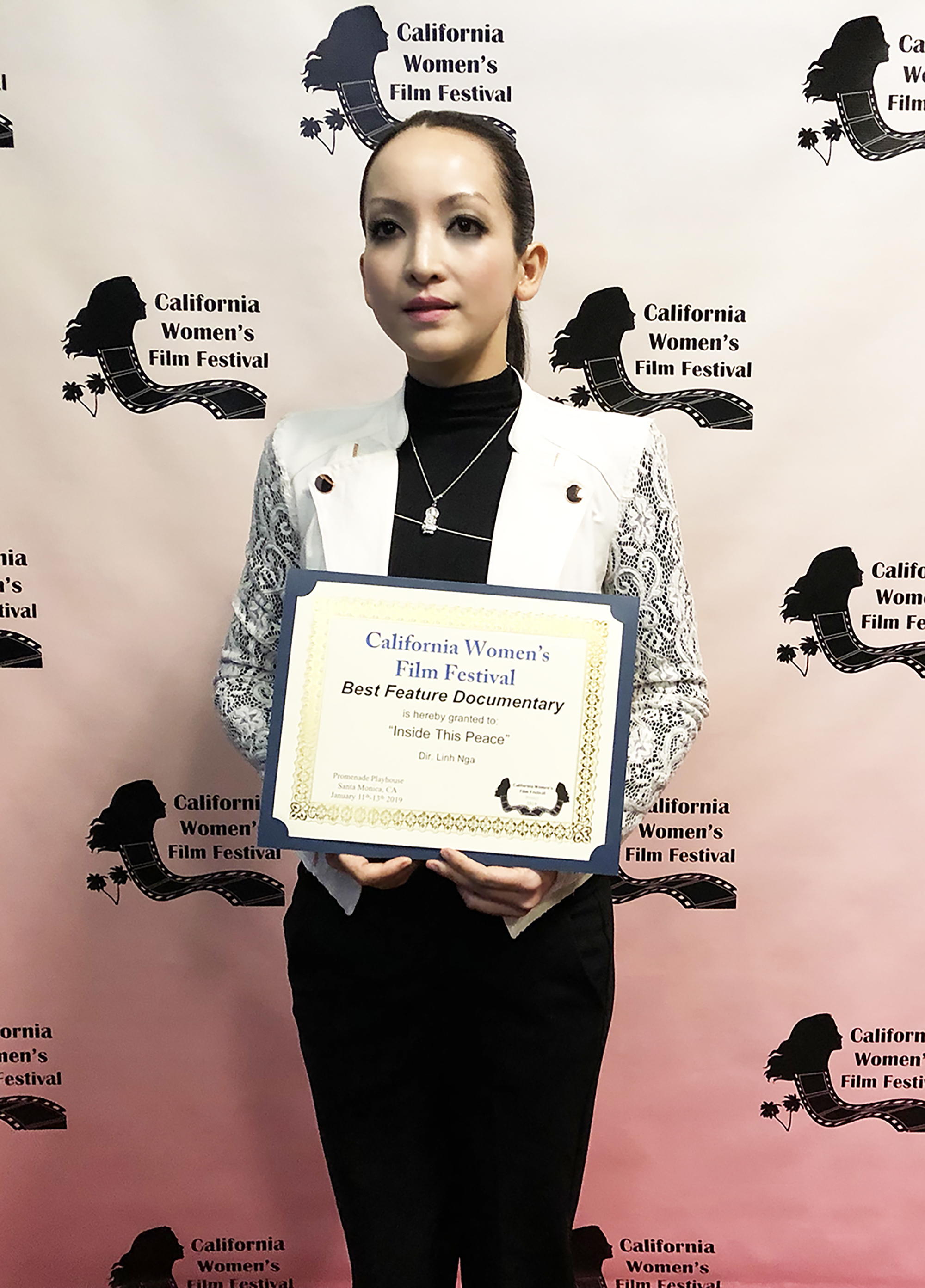
- Linh Nga at the CWFF 2019
- Born: January 3, 1982 (age 44); Hanoi, Vietnam
- Occupations: Director; Writer; Producer; Actress
- Years active: 1987–present
- Children: 2
- Website: http://www.linhnga.net/ http://www.9669films.com/

Linh Nga (/lɪn nɑː/ LIN NAH; born 3 January 1982), is an American-Vietnamese film director, film producer, actress, and screenwriter. Linh Nga's 2019 documentary "Inside this peace" won "Award Of Merit" at the Impact DOCS Awards, won "Best Feature Documentary" at the California Women's Film Festival, and nominated for "Best Feature Documentary" at the Action On Film International Film Festival. Her 2003 film Up and Down the Dust Way (Xuoi nguoc duong tran) won "TV Best Series" at the Vietnamese International Film Festival. She is the founder of 9669 films.

== Biography and career ==
Linh Nga was born in Hanoi, Vietnam, on January 3, 1982, to Quang Duy Nguyen, a composer, and Thuy Bich Thi Le, an opera singer.

Nga began her career on stage at an early age. She often sang and performed at friends' and family's functions and was part of a local song and dance troupe. In 1990, she earned her first award for "Nam Dinh City's Best Young Voice". Two years later, she joined the Club of Love (Cau lac bo tinh thuong), a registered charity group formed by Tuong Vi. She began her professional dancing career at the age of ten. In 1992, she began attending the Vietnam Academy of Dance (Truong Cao Dang mua Viet Nam), where she achieved artistic and academic honors upon graduation.

In 2000, Nga began studying film directing at the Hanoi Academy of Theatre and Cinema. She wrote, directed, and starred in the television series, Xuoi nguoc duong tran, in 2002. This earned a National Television Award at the Vietnamese International Film Festival for Best Television Series of the year. In 2006, Linh Nga graduated. During this time, she also worked for a Vietnam Television as an actress. Upon graduation, Nga went abroad and successfully applied to Chapman University in California, pursuing her Master of Fine Arts in film production and sound design.

In May 2014, Nga graduated from Chapman University. That same year, she founded 9669 Films. In November 2017, 9669 Films released the action comedy short What's the good of being good? (2017 film).

== Documentary about Agent Orange ==
In January 2019, Linh Nga and 9669 films won "Best Feature Documentary" at the California Women's Film Festival 2019 and earned "Award Of Merit" at the Impact DOCS Awards for the film "Inside this peace", a documentary about an Agent Orange victim struggling with life in Vietnam. "Inside this peace" is also nominated for "Best feature documentary" at the Action On Film International Film Festival

== Business ventures in Vietnam ==
In 2003, Nga helped found the Linh Nga Communication and Trading Company Lmt with her brother Linh Duy. The film company closed in 2010. Linh Nga also founded restaurants in Hanoi.

== Personal life ==
Nga reportedly had a romantic relationship with Thuyet Tran, known as Thuyet Buon Vua in Năm Cam case. The pair married in 2002. A week after, Thuyet was arrested and sentenced to 20 years in prison related to Năm Cam. In 2007 she married Johnny K.P.; they were divorced in 2011. She has two daughters.

== Filmography ==
Year	Film	Role	Notes
1997	Khoang cach	Actor	Lead Vietnam Television
1998	Ong bau ca nhac	Actor	3 Episodes Vietnam Television
1999	Day neo hanh phuc	Actor	
1999	Nu cuoi vang ma	Actor	
2000	Dom lua bien thuy	Actor	
2001	Xuoi nguoc duong tran	Screenwriter, Actor, Director	VIFF 2003 3 episodes (72 mins/episode)
2004	Tieng chuong dong	Actor	
2004	Manh hon cong ly	Actor	13 episodes Vietnam Television
2006	Quynh	Screenwriter, Director	Drama
2005	Vung cua song	Actor	3 episodes Vietnam Television
2005	Dam cuoi o thien duong	Actor	5 episodes Vietnam Television
2005	Gio thien duong	Screenwriter, Director	Drama
2012	Dumb Luck	Actor	Thúy Nga Productions
2012	Vstar Reunion	MC	VFTV
2013	The Industry of Marrying Europeans	Actor	Thúy Nga Productions
2017	What's the good of being good? (2017 film)	Screenwriter, Director, Producer	Action/Comedy/Adventure
2018	Inside This Peace	Screenwriter, Director, Producer	Feature Documentary (60 mins)
2019	Horror	Screenwriter, Director, Producer, Actor	Action/Horror/Feature (120 mins)

== Honours & Awards ==
2003	Best TV Series of 2003 in the Festival "Academy International Award VIFF" for Xuoi nguoc duong tran
2019	Best Feature Documentary at California Women's Film Festival 2019 for Inside this Peace
2019	"Award Of Merit" for Feature Documentary at the Impact DOCs Awards for "Inside this peace"
2019	Nominated for Best Feature Documentary at the Action On Film International Film Festival for "Inside this peace"
