= Bolinao 52 =

2007 American documentary film

- Directed by: Duc Nguyen
- Release date: March 19, 2007

Bolinao 52 is a documentary by Vietnamese American director Duc Nguyen about the Vietnamese boat people ship that was originally stranded in the Pacific Ocean in 1988. During their 37 days at sea, the group encountered violent storms and engine failures. They fought their thirst and hunger and a US Navy ship reportedly refused to rescue them, forcing the boat people to starve despite resorting to cannibalism. Only 52 out of the 110 boat people survived the tragedy and were rescued by Filipino fishermen who brought them to Bolinao in the Philippines.

Bolinao 52 premiered on March 19, 2007, in San Francisco and on March 24, 2007, in San Jose at the San Francisco International Asian American Film Festival.

== See also ==
- Boat people
- Vượt Sóng
- Vietnamese International Film Festival
