= Mother Fish =

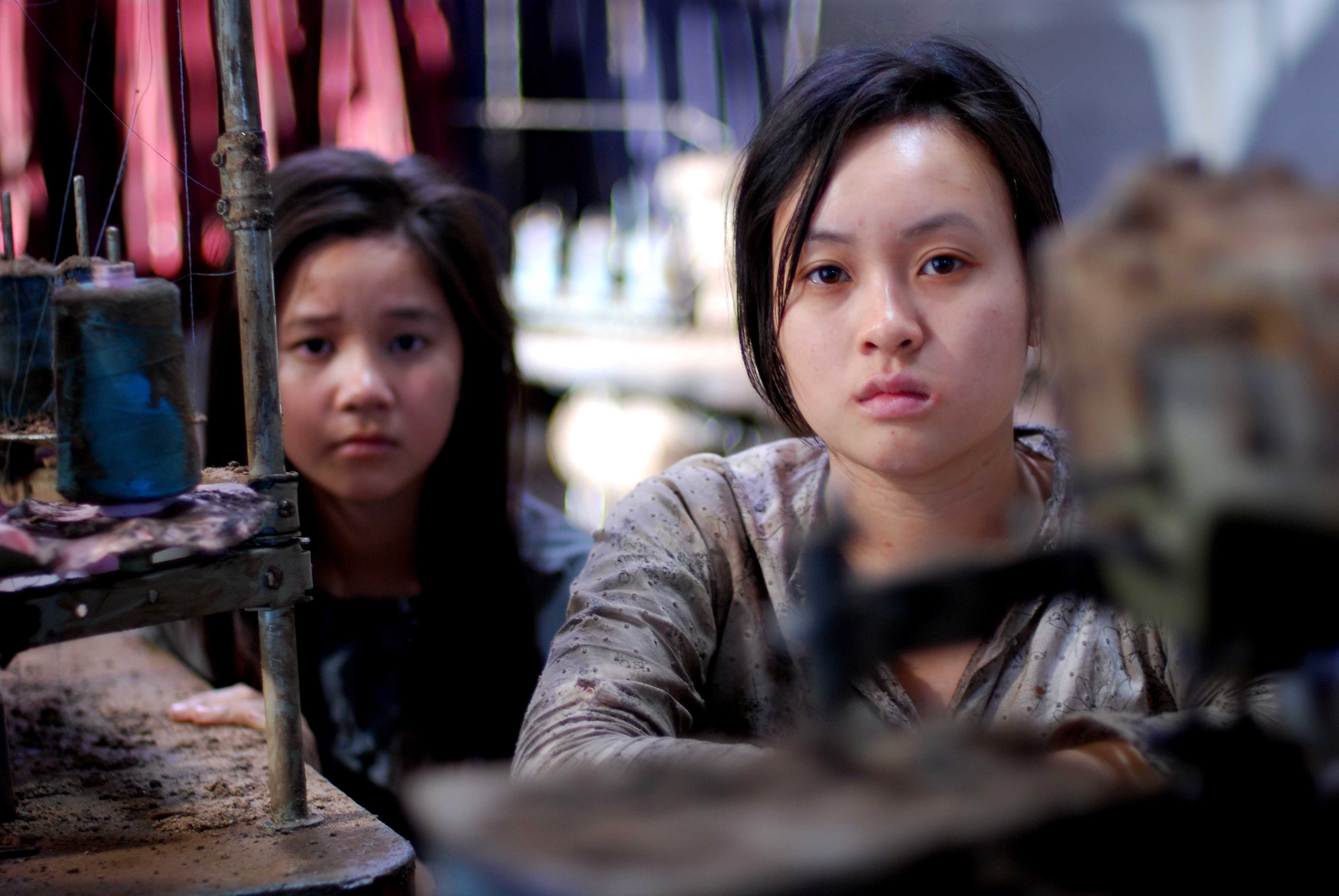
- Directed by: Khoa Do
- Written by: Khoa Do
- Produced by: Khoa Do
- Starring: Kathy Nguyen; Sheena Pham; Hieu Phan; Vico Thai
- Cinematography: Peter Holland
- Music by: Alan John
- Production company: Imaginefly
- Distributed by: Titan View
- Release date: 9 June 2009 (Sydney)
- Running time: 92 minutes
- Country: Australia
- Languages: English; Vietnamese

Mother Fish, also known as Missing Water, is a feature film written, produced and directed by Khoa Do. The film draws largely from Khoa Do's own experiences as a Vietnamese refugee, and reflects on the perceived fear in the general population generated by 'boat people' which is prevalent in Australian politics and discourse.

== Plot ==
Mother Fish follows the story of a middle-aged Vietnamese woman (Hyen Nguyen) working in a suburban sweatshop. In the evening when the workers have left, she is transported back to the night she and her sister (Sheena Pham) fled her homeland, led by an uncle promising to reunite them with their father.

Through the setting of the sweatshop, the woman remembers the journey. The boat is unprepared for the ocean crossing, as are they. Food and water supplies are low, their engine breaks, and the threat of rape and death at the hands of South-sea pirates is real. Through the woman's memory the audience relives the experience of crossing the ocean in search of a better life.

== Development ==
Mother Fish was an original play written by Khoa Do and produced by Powerhouse Youth Theatre. The play drew from Khoa Do's own experience arriving by boat to Australia in the 1980s, when he was two years old.

Do has stated that the development of the film was highly personal, and its intention was for the audience to empathise with the plight of boat people. The film communicates this message by ending with the statistic that over 1,500,000 people fled Vietnam between 1975 and 1996. Only 900,000 of those made land, meaning that 600,000 were lost at sea. Of the survivors, approximately 137,000 came to Australia.

== Production ==
A defining feature of Mother Fish is that it was shot in a similar style to Lars von Trier's Dogville, by setting all the action entirely within the sweatshop.

Do chose to work with first-time actors who had all either been refugees or descendants of refugees. Hieu Phan, who plays the woman's Uncle, was a refugee who made the crossing 30 years ago, and has spoken of weeping in rehearsals as the memory of his own boat journey came back to him. While shooting, the cast were kept on a strict monitored diet to lose weight in a similar manner to refugees who had made the crossing.

== Reception ==
Mother Fish held its world premiere at the 2009 Sydney Film Festival where it was also in Official Competition. At the festival it won the 2009 Community Relations Commission Award, which acknowledges on screen work promoting linguistic and cultural diversity.

On 19 April 2010, Mother Fish had its theatrical premiere at Riverside Theatres Parramatta, coinciding with the 35th anniversary of Vietnamese settlement in Australia. The Parliamentary Secretary for Multicultural Affairs and Settlement Services paid tribute to the premiere.

Mother Fish received largely positive reviews. It scored four stars from Margaret Pomeranz and three and a half stars from David Stratton on the program At the Movies.

Reviewers generally debated Khao Do's daring approach of creating the boat trip out of the space of the sweatshop, however performances were generally critically praised for their 'honesty', usually driven by the actors own backgrounds.

Mother Fish also won the DigiSPAA Award for best film shot digitally in 2010 and the Spotlight Award at the Vietnamese International Film Festival in Los Angeles.
