= Remy Hii =

Australian actor (born 1986)

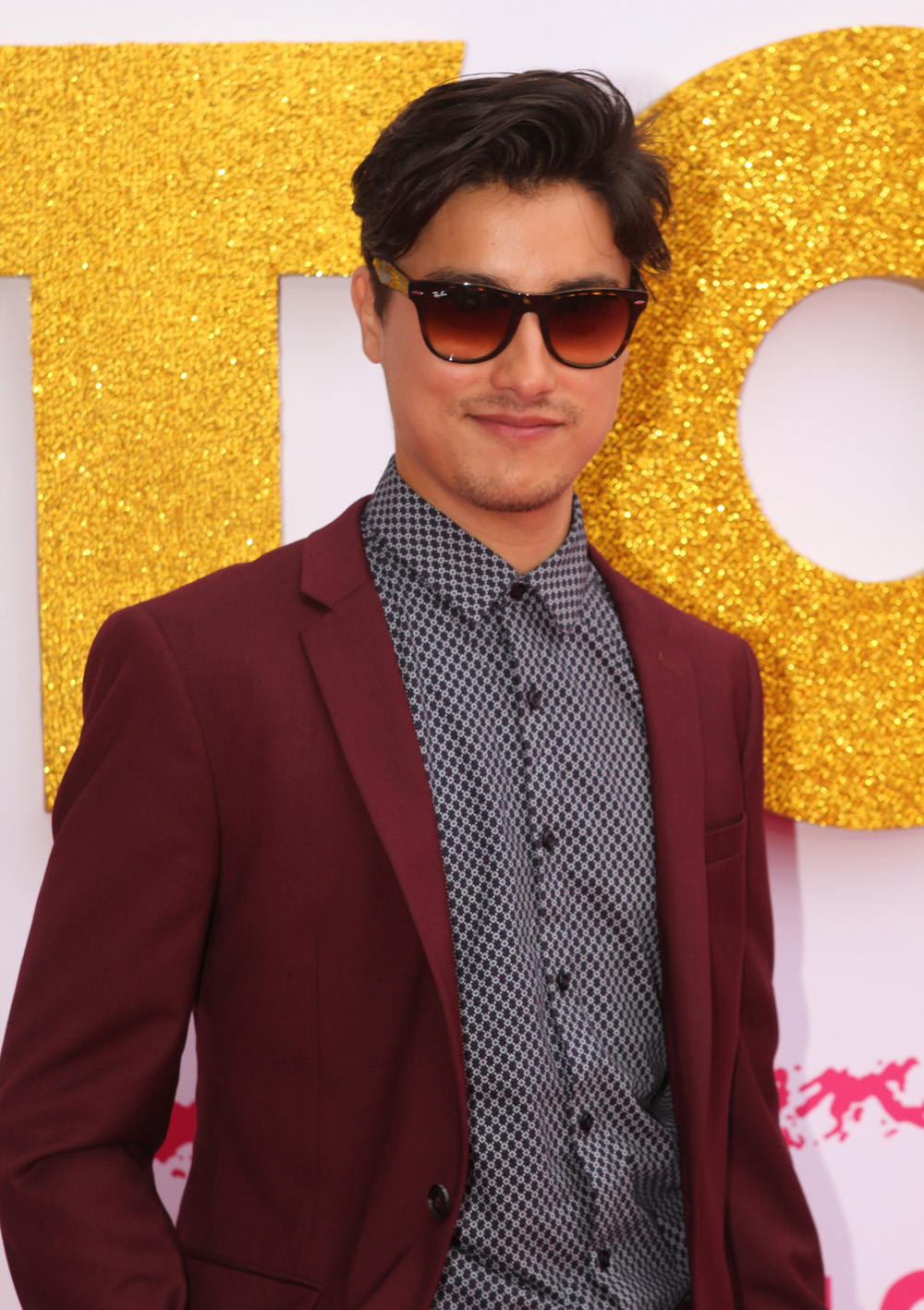
- Hii in 2018
- Born: July 24, 1986 (age 40); Kota Kinabalu, Sabah, Malaysia
- Other name: Remy Hill
- Education: Queensland University of Technology; National Institute of Dramatic Art (BFA)
- Occupation: Actor
- Years active: 2009–present

Remy Hii is an Australian actor. Hii attended the National Institute of Dramatic Art for three years, and appeared in various theatre productions, before being cast in his first television role. Hii received his big break when he starred in the leading role of Van Tuong Nguyen in the four-part miniseries Better Man. Soon after he was cast as Hudson Walsh in the long-running soap opera Neighbours in 2013.

He is also known as Prince Jingim from the Netflix original series Marco Polo, Simon Van Reyk in the Australian television crime drama Harrow, chef Ben Zhao in Australian comedy series Aftertaste, Dalbert Tan in the Australian dramedy series Wellmania and Marcus in the animated steampunk series Arcane.

In film, Hii is known for his supporting roles in the romantic comedy film Crazy Rich Asians, and Marvel's Spider-Man: Far From Home.

== Early life ==
Hii was born in Kota Kinabalu, Sabah, Malaysia to a Chinese-Malaysian father from Sabah and a British mother from Manchester. His father's family left China during the Cultural Revolution and settled in Malaysia like many others. He moved with his parents to Townsville, Queensland when he was eight. He attended the Queensland University of Technology. His early theatre work was with The Emerge Project, an arm of Switchboard Arts. There he performed in a number of original productions in Brisbane by local playwrights between 2005 and 2007. From 2009 to 2011 he attended the National Institute of Dramatic Art (NIDA) in Sydney where he graduated in 2011. During his time at NIDA, Hii played in the Sydney indie-rock group RAPIDS, alongside Will Shepherd, and fellow actors Angus McLaren and Jamie Timony. The band released a self-titled EP in 2010.

== Career ==
Hii's professional theatre debut was with the Queensland Theatre Company's production of The Estimator in 2007, after he was noticed by its playwright David Brown performing in a play reading with The Emerge Project. He was later cast in guest roles in the television series East of Everything and H_{2}O: Just Add Water. In 2011, Hii appeared as Tom in the short film Kiss. Hii appeared in the lead role of Van Tuong Nguyen in SBS's four-part miniseries Better Man, which began airing from 25 July 2013. The series is based on a true story. The role led to Hii receiving a nomination for Best Lead Actor in a Television Drama at the 2014 AACTA Awards and the Most Outstanding Newcomer accolade the 2014 Logie Awards.

On 12 June 2013, Hii joined the cast of Neighbours as Hudson Walsh. Hudson was introduced as a love interest for established character Chris Pappas (James Mason). On 20 June, Hii told Daniel Kilkelly from Digital Spy that he had been asked back to continue filming the following month. After leaving Neighbours, Hii was cast as Prince Jingim in the Netflix drama Marco Polo. The series was cancelled after two seasons in 2016. Hii went on to appear in Paul Currie's 2017 thriller film 2:22, and he has a recurring role as Sam in the Australian television drama Sisters. Hii portrays Alistair Cheng in the 2018 romantic comedy film Crazy Rich Asians, based on the novel of the same name by Kevin Kwan.

From 2018 to 2019, he played Simon Van Reyk, a forensic pathologist, in the crime drama Harrow. He appeared in every episode of the first series. In 2019, Hii played Brad Davis in Spider-Man: Far From Home. He was set to have the lead role of Luen in Jane the Novela, a spin-off from Jane the Virgin, but the series was not picked up by The CW. In February 2021, Hii starred as Ben Zhao in the ABC comedy-drama series Aftertaste. Later that year, Hii joined the ensemble cast of The Princess Switch 3: Romancing the Star.

In 2023, Hii played Dalbert Tan in the Netflix comedy drama Wellmania. The series is based on Brigid Delaney's book Wellmania: Misadventures in the Search for Wellness and was filmed in Sydney. Hii also voices a rabbit called Bunniguru in the Australian animated film Scarygirl.

On 28 October, Hii was named for the animated film The Pout Pout Fish.

On 11 April 2025, Hii was named in the cast of the film Posthumous.

== Filmography ==
=== Film ===
Year	Title	Role	Notes
2009	Beyond Blood	Gabriel Truong	Short film
2009	Maligayang Pasko		Short film
2010	Origami	Boy	Short film
2011	Kiss	Tom	Short film
2012	Treading Water	Tom	Short film; as Remy Hill
2013	Mirrors	Manny	Short film
2017	2:22	Benny	
2018	Crazy Rich Asians	Alistair Cheng	
2019	Spider-Man: Far From Home	Brad Davis	
2021	The Princess Switch 3: Romancing the Star	Peter Maxwell	
2023	Scarygirl	Bunniguru	Voice
2024	The Sloth Lane	Platy	Voice
2026	The Pout-Pout Fish	Benji	Voice
2026	Posthumous	Alex	Post-production

=== Television ===
Year	Title	Role	Notes
2009	East of Everything	Guest	Recurring role
2009	H_{2}O: Just Add Water	Bass Guitarist	Recurring role
2013	Better Man	Van Tuong Nguyen	Series lead Logie Award for Most Outstanding Newcomer; Nominated – AACTA Award for Best Lead Actor in a Television Drama
2013–2014	Neighbours	Hudson Walsh	Recurring role
2014–2016	Marco Polo	Prince Jingim	Main cast
2017	Sisters	Sam	Recurring role
2018–2019	Harrow	Simon Van Reyk	Main cast
2019	Jane the Novela	Luen	Unsold television pilot
2021	Aftertaste	Ben Zhao	
2021	Arcane	Enforcer/Sheriff Marcus	Voice / regular role
2023	Wellmania	Dalbert Tan	Main cast
