= Anh's Brush with Fame =

- Genre: Arts, talk
- Starring: Anh Do
- Country of origin: Australia
- Original language: English
- No. of series: 6
- No. of episodes: 62

Production
- Producer: Johnny Lowry
- Production company: Screentime

Original release
- Network: ABC
- Release: 24 August 2016 – 29 June 2021

Anh's Brush with Fame, also known as Anh Do's Brush With Fame, is an Australian television series, first broadcast on the ABC starting 24 August 2016. The program features comedian Anh Do painting a portrait of a celebrity while interviewing his subject.

The celebrities to feature in the inaugural series included Amanda Keller, Jimmy Barnes, Magda Szubanski, Craig McLachlan and Anthony Mundine. The program was renewed for a second series of 10 episodes which aired from 12 April 2017, with singer Jessica Mauboy featured in the first episode. The series 2 finale, featuring Samuel Johnson, was filmed after the initial 10 episodes had been completed and therefore not included in the series 2 DVD set.

Do is an accomplished artist, having won art prizes previously and been a finalist in the prestigious Archibald Prize.

The fourth series premiered on 17 April 2019, the fifth series on 4 August 2020 and the sixth series on 30 March 2021.

In 2021 it was revealed that Do receives assistance in the form of advice from his art teacher Paul Ryan in the early stages of each work, and in some episodes where the guest doesn't have the time for a full sitting the finished painting is prepared in advance from photographs.

== Episodes ==
=== Series overview ===
| Series | Episodes | Originally released | | Region 4 DVD release |
| Series | Episodes | First released | Last released | Region 4 DVD release |
|---|---|---|---|---|
| 1 | 8 | 24 August 2016 | 12 October 2016 | 26 April 2017 |
| 2 | 11 | 12 April 2017 | 5 July 2017 | 14 June 2017 |
| 3 | 9 | 18 July 2018 | 12 September 2018 | 3 October 2018 |
| 4 | 14 | 17 April 2019 | 24 July 2019 | TBA |
| 5 | 10 | 4 August 2020 | 13 October 2020 | TBA |
| 6 | 14 | 30 March 2021 | 29 June 2021 | TBA |

=== Series 1 (2016) ===
| No. overall | No. in series | Celebrity | Original release date | Australian viewers |
|---|---|---|---|---|
| 1 | 1 | "Magda Szubanski" | 24 August 2016 | 806,000 |
| 2 | 2 | "Amanda Keller" | 31 August 2016 | 841,000 |
| 3 | 3 | "Dr Charlie Teo" | 7 September 2016 | 793,000 |
| 4 | 4 | "Kate Ceberano" | 14 September 2016 | 755,000 |
| 5 | 5 | "Craig McLachlan" | 21 September 2016 | 710,000 |
| 6 | 6 | "Jimmy Barnes" | 28 September 2016 | 693,000 |
| 7 | 7 | "Kyle Sandilands" | 5 October 2016 | 674,000 |
| 8 | 8 | "Anthony Mundine" | 12 October 2016 | 718,000 |

=== Series 2 (2017) ===
| No. overall | No. in series | Celebrity | Original release date | Australian viewers |
|---|---|---|---|---|
| 9 | 1 | "Jessica Mauboy" | 12 April 2017 | 583,000 |
| 10 | 2 | "Rosie Batty" | 19 April 2017 | 597,000 |
| 11 | 3 | "Anthony Field" | 26 April 2017 | 565,000 |
| 12 | 4 | "Megan Gale" | 3 May 2017 | 588,000 |
| 13 | 5 | "Ian Thorpe" | 10 May 2017 | 643,000 |
| 14 | 6 | "Ray Martin" | 17 May 2017 | 623,000 |
| 15 | 7 | "Kurt Fearnley" | 24 May 2017 | 512,000 |
| 16 | 8 | "Tina Arena" | 7 June 2017 | 631,000 |
| 17 | 9 | "Jack Charles" | 14 June 2017 | 595,000 |
| 18 | 10 | "Fiona Wood" | 28 June 2017 | 623,000 |
| 19 | 11 | "Samuel Johnson" | 5 July 2017 | 643,000 |

=== Series 3 (2018) ===
| No. overall | No. in series | Celebrity | Original release date | Australian viewers |
|---|---|---|---|---|
| 20 | 1 | "Terri Irwin" | 18 July 2018 | 669,000 |
| 21 | 2 | "Gill Hicks" | 25 July 2018 | 629,000 |
| 22 | 3 | "Adam Goodes" | 1 August 2018 | 671,000 |
| 23 | 4 | "Carrie Bickmore" | 8 August 2018 | 662,000 |
| 24 | 5 | "Dr Munjed Al Muderis" | 15 August 2018 | 654,000 |
| 25 | 6 | "John Williamson" | 22 August 2018 | 652,000 |
| 26 | 7 | "Lauren Jackson" | 29 August 2018 | 579,000 |
| 27 | 8 | "Dr Karl Kruszelnicki" | 5 September 2018 | 682,000 |
| 28 | 9 | "Sigrid Thornton" | 12 September 2018 | 665,000 |

=== Series 4 (2019) ===
| No. overall | No. in series | Celebrity | Original release date | Australian viewers |
|---|---|---|---|---|
| 29 | 1 | "Michael Clarke" | 17 April 2019 | 625,000 |
| 30 | 2 | "Lindy Chamberlain-Creighton" | 24 April 2019 | 667,000 |
| 31 | 3 | "Tim Minchin" | 1 May 2019 | 687,000 |
| 32 | 4 | "Leah Purcell" | 15 May 2019 | 555,000 |
| 33 | 5 | "Walter Mikac" | 22 May 2019 | 626,000 |
| 34 | 6 | "Dannii Minogue" | 29 May 2019 | 682,000 |
| 35 | 7 | "Deborah Hutton" | 5 June 2019 | 565,000 |
| 36 | 8 | "Alan Jones" | 12 June 2019 | 544,000 |
| 37 | 9 | "Saroo Brierley" | 19 June 2019 | 681,000 |
| 38 | 10 | "Georgie Parker" | 26 June 2019 | 641,000 |
| 39 | 11 | "Dr Gordian Fulde" | 3 July 2019 | 599,000 |
| 40 | 12 | "Archie Roach" | 10 July 2019 | 492,000 |
| 41 | 13 | "Kylie Kwong" | 17 July 2019 | 664,000 |
| 42 | 14 | "David Wenham" | 24 July 2019 | 722,000 |

=== Series 5 (2020) ===
| No. overall | No. in series | Celebrity | Original release date | Australian viewers |
|---|---|---|---|---|
| 43 | 1 | "Lisa Wilkinson" | 4 August 2020 | 685,000 |
| 44 | 2 | "Dr. Richard Harris" | 11 August 2020 | 710,000 |
| 45 | 3 | "Anna Meares" | 18 August 2020 | 613,000 |
| 46 | 4 | "Sophie Delezio" | 25 August 2020 | 603,000 |
| 47 | 5 | "Jack Thompson" | 1 September 2020 | 682,000 |
| 48 | 6 | "Layne Beachley" | 8 September 2020 | 611,000 |
| 49 | 7 | "Father Bob" | 15 September 2020 | 649,000 |
| 50 | 8 | "Todd Sampson" | 22 September 2020 | 638,000 |
| 51 | 9 | "Deborra-Lee Furness" | 29 September 2020 | 716,000 |
| 52 | 10 | "Michelle Payne" | 13 October 2020 | 619,000 |

=== Series 6 (2021) ===
| No. overall | No. in series | Celebrity | Original release date | Australian viewers |
|---|---|---|---|---|
| 53 | 1 | "Jamie Durie" | 30 March 2021 | 509,000 |
| 54 | 2 | "Kate Ritchie" | 6 April 2021 | 556,000 |
| 55 | 3 | "Jane Seymour" | 13 April 2021 | 549,000 |
| 56 | 4 | "Kamahl" | 20 April 2021 | 491,000 |
| 57 | 5 | "Guy Sebastian" | 27 April 2021 | 555,000 |
| 58 | 6 | "Tara Moss" | 4 May 2021 | 545,000 |
| 59 | 7 | "Manu Feildel" | 18 May 2021 | 462,000 |
| 60 | 8 | "Li Cunxin" | 25 May 2021 | 558,000 |
| 61 | 9 | "Missy Higgins" | 1 June 2021 | 542,000 |
| 62 | 10 | "Michael Kirby" | 8 June 2021 | 542,000 |

== Awards and nominations ==
| Year | Award | Category | Recipients and nominees | Result | Refs. |
|---|---|---|---|---|---|
| 2017 | Logie Awards of 2017 | Best Entertainment Program | Anh's Brush with Fame | Nominated | |
| 2017 | Logie Awards of 2017 | Most Outstanding Entertainment Program | Anh's Brush with Fame | Nominated | |
| 2018 | Logie Awards of 2018 | Most Popular Entertainment Program | Anh's Brush with Fame | Nominated | |
| 2019 | Logie Awards of 2019 | Most Popular Entertainment Program | Anh's Brush with Fame | Nominated | |
