= Katherine Knight =

Australian murderer (born 1955)

- Born: Katherine Mary Knight; 24 October 1955 (age 71); Tenterfield, New South Wales, Australia
- Occupation: Abattoir worker
- Known for: Murdering and mutilating John Price
- Spouse: David Kellett (m. 1974; div. 1984)
- Children: 4
- Parents: Ken Knight; Barbara Roughan
- Status: Incarcerated
- Motive: Revenge for Price ending their relationship
- Conviction: Murder
- Penalty: Life imprisonment without possibility of parole

Details
- Date: 29 February 2000
- Country: Australia
- State: New South Wales
- Location: Aberdeen
- Weapon: Knife
- Imprisoned at: Silverwater Women's Correctional Centre

Katherine Mary Knight (born 24 October 1955) is an Australian murderer and the first woman in the country's history to be sentenced to life imprisonment without the possibility of parole. She was convicted for the murder of her de facto husband, John "Pricey" Price, in February 2000, and is currently imprisoned at the Silverwater Women's Correctional Centre in New South Wales. Knight stabbed Price to death, skinned him and then put his skin on a meat hook, which she had recently installed. She then cooked his head and parts of his body with the intention of feeding them to Price's children, but was stopped by police after an employee of his went to check on him after he had not been at work that day.

== Early life and family ==
Katherine Knight was born and raised in an unconventional and dysfunctional family environment. Her mother, Barbara Roughan (née Thorley; 1930–1986), had been married to Scottish-born John "Jack" Roughan and lived with him in the small town of Aberdeen in New South Wales' Hunter Valley. They had four sons before Barbara began an adulterous relationship with Kenneth "Ken" Charles Knight (1927–2009), a friend and co-worker of her then-husband.

The local backlash forced Barbara and Ken to move to Moree. None of her sons went with her; the two eldest boys continued to reside with their father and the two younger sons were sent to be raised by an aunt in Sydney. Barbara had four additional children with Ken, including twin girls born in 1955 in Tenterfield; Knight was one of these twin daughters. In 1959, when Knight was four years old, John Roughan died and his two older sons moved in with Barbara and Ken.

Ken was a violent alcoholic who would rape Barbara up to ten times per day. Barbara, in turn, often shared intimate details of her sex life with her daughters and expressed her hatred for sex and men. Later, when Knight complained to her mother about a sexual partner wanting her to engage in a sex act she did not wish to perform, Barbara advised her to endure it and stop complaining. Knight alleged she was frequently sexually assaulted by several members of her family, excluding her father, until she was aged 11. Although there are doubts regarding the specifics, psychiatrists accepted her allegations, and these events have been largely confirmed by other family members.

Barbara's great-grandmother was an Indigenous Australian from the Moree area who had married an Irishman. Barbara took pride in this heritage and identified as Aboriginal. However, this was kept a family secret due to the racism prevalent in the area at the time, and Barbara's ancestry became a source of tension for the children. Apart from her twin sister, the only person with whom Knight felt a close bond was her uncle, Oscar Knight, a champion horseman. She was devastated when Oscar died by suicide in 1969 and continues to claim that his ghost visits her. The family moved back to Aberdeen the same year.

When she attended Muswellbrook high school, Knight became a loner and is remembered by classmates as a bully who stood over smaller pupils. She assaulted at least one boy at school with a weapon and was once injured by a teacher, who was subsequently found to have acted in self-defence. By contrast, when not in a rage, Knight was a model student and often earned awards for her good behaviour.

Knight left school at the age of 15, having not learned to read or write. She initially worked as a cutter in a clothing factory before moving on to what she described as her "dream job" at a local abattoir, where she began cutting up offal. She quickly advanced to boning and received her own set of butchers' knives. Knight kept these knives hung over her bed at home, stating that they would always be handy if needed, a practice she maintained until her incarceration. Residents of Aberdeen later recalled Knight for her tendency to physically threaten anyone who angered her.

== Marriage to David Kellett ==
Knight first met co-worker David Stanford Kellett in 1973. Kellett engaged in heavy drinking which stemmed from two traumatic incidents from his previous railway job in Coffs Harbour: first, when his best friend was killed in front of him in a shunting accident; later, when he rescued injured occupants of a school bus in Kempsey which had been struck by a train, killing six children. He eventually lost the job due to deteriorating behaviour and performance, but he soon got work at the nearby Aberdeen abattoir and became close friends with Knight's brother. Often, if Kellett got into a fight, Knight would step in and back him up with her fists.

Knight married Kellett in 1974, at her request. They arrived at the service on her motorcycle, with Kellett appearing quite intoxicated on the pillion. Upon their arrival, Knight's mother, Barbara, offered Kellett some stern advice about his new wife. Barbara warned Kellett to be cautious, stating that upsetting Knight or cheating on her could lead to serious consequences, noting that Knight had a volatile behaviour. On their wedding night, Knight attempted to strangle Kellett, later explaining that it was due to him falling asleep after they had intercourse only three times.

The marriage proved particularly violent, and on one occasion a heavily pregnant Knight burned all of Kellett's clothing and shoes before hitting him across the back of the head with a frying pan, simply because he had arrived home late from a darts competition after reaching the finals. In fear for his life, Kellett fled before collapsing in a neighbour's house and was treated for a severely fractured skull. Police wanted to charge Knight, but she changed her behaviour to ingratiating Kellett and talked him into dropping the charges.

In May 1976, shortly after the birth of their first child, Melissa Ann, Kellett left Knight for another woman and moved to Queensland, apparently unable to cope with the abuse. The next day, Knight was seen pushing her newborn baby in a pram down the main street, violently throwing the pram from side to side. She was admitted to St Elmo's Hospital in Tamworth, where she was diagnosed with postnatal depression and spent several weeks recovering. After being released, Knight placed two-month-old Melissa on a railway line shortly before a train was due. She then stole an axe, went into town and threatened to kill several people. A homeless man known in the district as "Old Ted", who was foraging near the railway line, found and rescued Melissa, by all accounts only minutes before the train passed. Knight was arrested and again taken to St Elmo's Hospital, but apparently she recovered and signed herself out the following day.

A few days later, Knight slashed the face of a woman with one of her knives and demanded she drive her to Queensland to find Kellett. The woman escaped after they stopped at a service station; however, by the time police arrived, Knight had taken a young boy hostage and was threatening him with the knife. She was disarmed when police attacked her with brooms and was admitted to Morisset psychiatric hospital. Knight told the nurses she had intended to kill the mechanic at the service station because he had repaired Kellett's car, which had allowed him to leave, and then kill both her husband and his mother when she arrived in Queensland. When police informed Kellett of the incident, he left his girlfriend and moved to Aberdeen with his mother to support Knight.

Knight was released on 9 August 1976 into the care of her mother-in-law and, along with Kellett, moved to Ipswich, a city west of Brisbane, where she obtained a job at the Dinmore meatworks. On 6 March 1980, they had another daughter, Natasha Maree. In 1984, Knight left Kellett and moved, first to her parents' house in Aberdeen, then to a rented house in nearby Muswellbrook. Although she returned to work at the abattoir, she injured her back the following year and went on a disability pension. Since she no longer needed to rent accommodation close to her work, the government provided her with a Housing Commission residence in Aberdeen.

== Other relationships ==
=== David Saunders ===
Knight met 38-year-old miner David Saunders in 1986. A few months later, he moved in with her and her daughters, although he kept his old apartment in Scone. Knight soon became jealous of what he did when she was not around and would often throw him out. He would move back to his apartment, where she would invariably follow and beg him to return. In May 1987, Knight cut the throat of Saunders' two-month-old dingo pup in front of him, for no more reason than as an example of what would happen if he ever had an affair, before going on to knock him unconscious with a frying pan. In June 1988, she gave birth to a third daughter, Sarah, which prompted Saunders to put a deposit on a house; Knight paid off the deposit when her workers' compensation came through in 1989. Knight decorated the house throughout with animal skins, skulls, horns, rusty animal traps, leather jackets, old boots, machetes, rakes and pitchforks. No space, including the ceilings, was left uncovered.

After an argument in which she hit Saunders in the face with an iron before stabbing him in the abdomen with a pair of scissors, he moved back to Scone, but when he later returned home to Aberdeen, he found she had cut up all his clothes. Saunders took a long service leave and went into hiding. Knight tried to find him, but no one admitted to knowing his whereabouts. Several months later, Saunders returned to see his daughter and found that Knight had gone to the police and unjustly told them she was afraid of him. They issued her an Apprehended Violence Order (AVO) against him.

=== John Chillingworth ===
Knight's next romantic relationship—with a 43-year-old former abattoir co-worker named John Chillingworth—started in 1990. Knight became pregnant, and she gave birth to a son, named Eric, in March 1991. Chillingworth and Knight's relationship ended in December 1993.

=== John Price ===
John Charles Thomas "Pricey" Price, born 4 April 1955, was reputedly a "terrific bloke" who was well liked by everyone who knew him, even his ex-wife (they divorced in 1988). He and his ex-wife had three children together: Jonathan, Rosemary, and a daughter born c. 1985 whose name was subject to a suppression order. Jonathan and Rosemary lived with Price, and the younger daughter lived with her mother.

Price was aware of Knight's violent reputation when she moved into his house in 1995. However, his children liked her, he was making a lot of money working in the local mines, and, apart from violent arguments, at first "life was a bunch of roses".

In 1998, Knight and Price fought over his refusal to marry her. In retaliation, she videotaped items he had allegedly stolen from work and sent the tape to his boss. Although the items were out-of-date medical kits that he had scavenged from the company rubbish tip, Price was fired from the job he had held for seventeen years. That same day, he kicked her out and she returned to her own home while news of what she had done spread throughout the town.

A few months later, Price restarted the relationship, although he now refused to allow her to move in with him. The fighting became even more frequent, and most of his friends would no longer have anything to do with him while they remained together.

== Murder of John Price ==
In February 2000, a series of assaults on Price culminated with Knight stabbing him in the chest. Finally fed up, he kicked her out of his house. On 28 February, he stopped at the Scone Magistrate's Court on his way to work and took out a restraining order in an attempt to keep her away from both himself and his children. That afternoon, Price told his co-workers that if he did not come to work the next day, it would be because Knight had murdered him. Despite their pleas that Price should not return home, he stated that he was afraid Knight would kill his children if he did not.

Price arrived home to find that Knight, although not there herself, had sent the children away for a sleep-over at a friend's house. He then spent the evening with his neighbours before returning home and going to bed at 11 pm. Earlier that day, Knight had bought new black lingerie and had videotaped all her children while making comments which have since been interpreted as a crude, makeshift will. She later arrived at Price's house while he was sleeping and sat watching television for a few minutes before having a shower. She then woke Price and they had sex, after which he fell asleep.

At 6 am the next day, a neighbour became concerned that Price's car was still in the driveway, and when he did not arrive at work, his employer sent a worker to see what was wrong. Both the neighbour and the worker tried knocking on Price's bedroom window to wake him, but they alerted police after noticing blood on the front door. Breaking down the back door, police found Price's body, with Knight comatose from taking a large number of pills. She had stabbed Price with a butcher's knife while he was sleeping. The blood evidence appeared to show that he awoke and tried to turn the light on before attempting to escape while Knight chased him through the house. He managed to open the front door and get outside, but he either stumbled back inside or was dragged back into the hallway, where he finally died after bleeding out. Later, Knight went into Aberdeen and withdrew $1,000 from Price's bank account at an ATM. Price's autopsy revealed that he had been stabbed at least 37 times, in both the front and back of his torso, with many of the wounds extending into vital organs.

Several hours after Price had died, Knight skinned him and hung the skin from a meat hook on the architrave of a door to the lounge room. She then decapitated Price and cooked parts of his body, serving up the flesh with baked potato, carrot, pumpkin, beetroot, zucchini, cabbage, yellow squash and gravy in two settings at the dinner table, along with a note beside each plate, each bearing the name of one of Price's two children, suggesting preparations for serving him to his children as a meal. A third meal was thrown on the back lawn for unknown reasons, and it is speculated that Knight had attempted to eat it but could not. This has been put forward in support of her claim that she has no memory of the crime. Price's head was found in a pot with vegetables. The pot was still warm, estimated to be at between 40 and 50 °C (104 and 122 °F), indicating that the cooking had taken place in the early morning. Sometime later, Knight arranged the body with the left arm draped over an empty 1.25-litre soft drink bottle with the legs crossed. This was claimed in court to be an act of defilement demonstrating Knight's contempt for Price. Knight had left a handwritten note on top of a photograph of Price. Bloodstained and covered with small pieces of flesh, it said:

Time got you back Jonathon for raping my daughter.

You too Beck for Ross – for Little John. Now play with little John's dick, John Price.

Price's son Jonathan (Note: Sources use a variety of spellings, including "Jonathan" and "Johnathon".) was also known as "Little John", and "Beck" refers to Price's younger daughter, who was about 15 years old at the time. Rosemary (Price's elder daughter) had a four-year-old child, and had presumably already moved out of home. The accusations in the note were found to be groundless.

== Trial ==
Knight's initial offer to plead guilty to manslaughter was rejected, and she was charged on 2 March 2001 with murdering Price, to which she entered a plea of not guilty. Her trial was initially fixed for 23 July 2001, but it was adjourned due to her counsel's illness and it was re-fixed for 15 October 2001.

When the trial commenced, Justice Barry O'Keefe offered the 60 jury prospects the option of being excused due to the graphic nature of the photographic evidence, which five accepted. When the witness list was read out to the prospects, several more also dropped out after which the jury was empanelled. Knight's attorneys then spoke to the judge who adjourned to the following day. The next morning, Knight changed her plea to guilty, and the jury was dismissed. It was then made public that Justice O'Keefe had been advised of the plea change the day before. He had adjourned the trial and then ordered a psychiatric assessment overnight to determine if Knight understood the consequences of a guilty plea and was fit to make such a plea. Knight's legal team had planned to defend Knight by claiming amnesia and dissociation, a claim supported by most psychiatrists, although they did consider her sane. Two psychiatrists concluded that Knight suffered from borderline personality disorder.

No explanation has ever been provided for the guilty plea, and even after pleading guilty, Knight continued to deny responsibility for her actions. During the sentencing hearing, her lawyers asked for her to be excused from hearing certain details, but the request was denied. When Timothy Lyons testified about the skinning and decapitation, Knight became hysterical and had to be sedated.

During the trial on 8 November 2001, Justice O'Keefe emphasized the severity of the crime and Knight's lack of remorse, which warranted a harsh penalty. He sentenced her to life imprisonment without setting a non-parole period and mandated that her papers be labeled "definitely never to be released", marking a historic first for a woman in Australian legal history. She remained the only woman in Australia to receive a life-without-parole sentence until October 2026, when an appeals court increased the 33-life sentence of Erin Patterson to a full life term.

In June 2006, Knight appealed her life sentence, arguing that the penalty of life in prison without the possibility of parole was too severe for the crime. Justices Peter McClellan, Michael Adams and Megan Latham dismissed the appeal in September at the New South Wales Court of Criminal Appeal. Justice McClellan stated that the crime was appalling and nearly unimaginable in a civilized society.

== Prison ==
Knight has been reported to have taken a leadership role among prisoners at Silverwater Women's Correctional Centre and a mediator of disputes. It was reported in July 2017 that to that point she did not have a record of violence in prison and hadn't received any prison charges.

== See also ==
- List of incidents of cannibalism
- Erin Patterson – the second woman in Australia to receive life imprisonment without parole
