= Journey from the Fall =

- Theatrical release poster
- Directed by: Ham Tran
- Written by: Ham Tran
- Produced by: Lam Nguyen; Ham Tran
- Starring: Kieu Chinh; Long Nguyen; Diem Lien; Cat Ly
- Cinematography: Guillermo Rosas; Julie Kirkwood
- Edited by: Ham Tran
- Music by: Christopher Wong
- Distributed by: ImaginAsian Pictures
- Release dates: February 22, 2006 (Bangkok International Film Festival); March 23, 2007 (United States premiere)
- Running time: 135 minutes
- Country: United States
- Languages: Vietnamese; English

Journey from the Fall (Vietnamese: Vượt Sóng) is a 2006 independent film by writer/director/editor Ham Tran, about the Vietnamese re-education camp and boat people experience following the Fall of Saigon on April 30, 1975. This drama was released on March 23, 2007, by ImaginAsian to sold-out screenings. The film is notable for having been financed entirely by the Vietnamese American community.

== Plot ==
The film traces the story of a family's struggle for survival in the aftermath of the Fall of Saigon on April 30, 1975, to North Vietnam's communist regime. After her South Vietnamese Army husband Long, is imprisoned in a North Vietnamese re-education camp, Mai, her son Lai, and her mother-in-law escape Vietnam by boat in the hopes of starting a new life in Southern California. Believing his family is dead, Long gives up in the face of brutal conditions, while Mai struggles to keep her family from crumbling under the pressures of life in a new country. When Long learns his family is alive in America, he is reinvigorated and decides he must join them at any cost.

== Cast ==
- Diem Lien as Mai Nguyen
- Kieu Chinh as Ba Noi (Grandmother)
- Long Nguyen as Long Nguyen
- Nguyen Thai Nguyen as Lai Nguyen
- Cat Ly as Phuong
- Xavier Ortiz as Bully

== Reception ==
=== Critical response ===
The film was received with critical acclaim. On the review aggregation website Rotten Tomatoes, it received a 92% rating, with the consensus being that "Ham Tran's ambitious film proves to be extremely powerful due to stunning photography and passionate performances" and is currently ranked 27th in the Top 100 Best Movies of 2007. Matt Zoller Seitz of The New York Times remarked that the director "achieves the impossible" and called it a "tearjerker". Los Angeles Times called it a "superbly wrought saga of loss and survival" and "an example of sophisticated, impassioned filmmaking involving mainly people who lived through the harrowing experiences so unsparingly depicted". Bruce Newman of The Mercury News called it "heartbreaking" and gave it 4.5 out of 5 stars. Russell Edwards from Variety said it "deserves to be seen by a wider commercial audience" and is "frequently enthralling". New York magazine had a negative review of the film, saying that it has "several powerful sequences" but "never quite come[s] alive". Bill White of the Seattle Post-Intelligencer was even more critical, suggesting that "this Journey doesn't know where it's going", criticizing the "careless cinematography" and "clumsy stag[ing]".

=== Response from Vietnamese diaspora ===
An early cut of the film was screened in April 2005 in sold-out one-day-only showings in Little Saigon, Washington, D.C., and San Jose to commemorate the 30 year anniversary of the Fall of Saigon. The film was highly praised by the Vietnamese diaspora as an accurate presentation of the experiences that many Vietnamese people had to go through. In the process of making the film, the director interviewed more than 400 former boat people, some of whom are cast in the film even though they are not professional actors.

=== Accolades ===
Award	Year	Category	Recipient(s)	Result	Ref.
Amazonas Film Festival	2006	Grand Jury Prize	Ham Tran	Won	
Anchorage International Film Festival	2006	Golden Oosik Award for Best Feature	Ham Tran	Won	
Asian Excellence Award	2007	Outstanding Independent Film	Ham Tran	Won	
Asian Festival of First Films	2006	Best Director	Ham Tran	Won	
Asian Festival of First Films	2006	Best Producer	Lam Nguyen	Won	
Boulder International Film Festival	2006	Best Feature Film	Ham Tran	Won	
CAAMFest	2006	Audience Award, Narrative	Ham Tran	Won	
Milan Film Festival	2006	Best Photography	Julie Kirkwood & Guillermo Rosas	Won	
Newport Beach Film Festival	2006	Best Actor	Long Nguyen	Won	
Princess Grace Foundation	2006	Special Project Grant	Ham Tran	Won	
San Diego Asian Film Festival	2006	Grand Jury Prize	Ham Tran	Won	
Toronto Reel Asian International Film Festival	2006	Audience Award	Ham Tran	Won	
Vietnamese International Film Festival	2007	Best Feature	Ham Tran	Won	

== Controversies ==
The OC Weekly, an alternative weekly in Orange County, California, published two reviews of the film. The first and longer review was written by R. Scott Moxley, praised the director for "bring[ing] to life the true South Vietnamese experience". The second and much shorter review was published almost a year later, written by Scott Foundas. In his review, Foundas praised the film for being "one of the few movies to depict Vietnam and its aftermath through the eyes of the Vietnamese" but ultimately characterized it as "old-fashioned and even phony". This conclusion brought a flurry of letters to the paper, most disagreeing with Foundas and taking offense at his "phony" characterization, prompting Foundas to clarify his review, claiming that he was "by no means suggesting that the history depicted by the movie didn't happen, but rather that matters were not nearly as black-and-white as Mr. Tran makes them seem".

Following the negative ratings above, in Vietnam, where the film was neither filmed nor shown officially, unlicensed copies were so prevalent that the government issued orders to confiscate all DVD copies. The film was banned for its "reactionary" content. The government consider the film "defamation" and a "distortion" of its policy of sending people to re-education camps after 1975. The film was considered such a threat that the Ministry of Public Security's newspaper Công an Nhân dân featured an article warning about the "poisonous film" and claiming that "most overseas Vietnamese are indifferent or critical of this movie". The article also quoted Foundas and several random people in online message boards to bolster its claim.

== Release ==
The film is distributed by ImaginAsian Pictures, and released in Orange County, New York City, and San Jose on March 23, 2007, to sold-out screenings.

Since its opening weekend on March 23, 2007, it has expanded to Dallas, Houston, Washington, DC, San Diego, Chicago, San Francisco, Mountain View, Daly City, Seattle, Berkeley, Honolulu, Atlanta, Portland, Sacramento, Vancouver, and is expanding to other cities throughout the summer in what is called a "rolling release".

=== Box office performance ===
In the opening weekend, it played in packed theaters, generating $87,442 on just four screens, giving the film the largest per theater average for that weekend ($21,861).

As of July 16, the film has grossed over $630,000, despite a limited release that never exceeded fourteen theaters at a time.

== Home media release ==
The 2-disc DVD was released on October 31, 2007, which includes a 38-minute The Making of Journey from the Fall, a 135-minute roundtable discussion/commentary with cast and crew, a deleted scene and alternate ending, as well as original theatrical trailer and TV spots.

A Blu-ray version of the film was released on July 9, 2024 by Whole Grain Pictures.

== See also ==
- Boat people
- Boat People (film)
- Overseas Vietnamese
- Vietnamese International Film Festival
- Bolinao 52
- The White Silk Dress
