= Footy Legends =

- Directed by: Khoa Do
- Written by: Khoa Do, Anh Do and Suzanne Do
- Produced by: Megan McMurchy
- Starring: Anh Do; Angus Sampson; Emma Lung; Claudia Karvan
- Cinematography: Martin McGrath
- Edited by: Suresh Ayyar
- Distributed by: Icon Film Distribution & Fortissimo Films
- Release date: 3 August 2006
- Running time: 90 minutes
- Country: Australia
- Languages: English; Vietnamese

Footy Legends is a 2006 Australian film, directed and co-written by Khoa Do, produced by Megan McMurchy, starring Khoa's older brother and co-writer Anh Do, Angus Sampson, Emma Lung and Claudia Karvan. It was filmed in and around the Sydney western suburbs of Yagoona, Bankstown, Fairfield and Rookwood Necropolis. Footy Legends was released in Australia on 3 August 2006.

== Plot ==
Luc Vu is a young Vietnamese Australian man who lives in the western Sydney suburb of Yagoona with an obsession about rugby league football. He is unemployed, having lost his job at a factory which closed down, and is also the sole carer of his 11-year-old sister Anne after their mother died two years before.

After arriving home following an unsuccessful job interview as a Holden car salesman, Luc is met by Department of Community Services case worker Alison Berry, who informs him that Anne's primary school has lodged an official complaint against Luc over Anne's truancy and unpaid school fees, and that he must attend court to defend himself. Pressure on Luc is only added by his grandfather, an apparent Vietnam War veteran who does not believe in the concept of failure and losing.

Luc decides to enter into a rugby league tournament known as the Holden Cup in order to secure custody of Anne, where the winning team is awarded a Holden SS Ute and a modelling job at Lowes Menswear. He bands together six of his friends - Lloydy, Boof, Donald, Shane, Terry, and Walid - to play in the cup. All seven of them were once part of the Yagoona High School rugby team and touted as future stars of the sport, but since graduation their lives have crumbled as they suffer from the results of social problems like unemployment and addiction.

Luc, as captain, begins to train his team to prepare for the cup, and they soon play their first game, a qualifying match, in Kirribilli. They initially trail behind their opponents, but after being told by the referee that they can still qualify for the Cup by drawing the game, they do so and officially celebrate their first victory of the tournament. Despite this pressure continues to build on Luc around his upcoming court appearance, and Anne almost dies after an asthma attack near her mother's grave.

The Holden Cup begins, and the team, now nicknamed the Yagoona Schooners, initially struggle in their first match against the Dubbo Dingoes without their captain, however, after Luc turns up at half time and gives them a motivational speech, the team turns their fortunes around and manages to win the match. The team goes on to win every single match that follows, and they ultimately end up earning a spot in the grand final match.

However, before the final, Luc is informed by Alison that Anne will inevitably be placed into foster care due to his persistent negligence, and he finds out that his grandfather lied about fighting in the Vietnam War. On the day of the final, Luc is approached by the coach of a rival team, Billy Major, who offers Luc a permanent contract on his team. He turns it down, and in the dressing room before the game, some of the team argue with each other, before they all confess that despite the challenges they have faced in recent years, rugby is the only thing which gives them real satisfaction, and that them as a team has earned them the support of their loved ones and the local community.

The stadium is packed with spectators for the grand final match, including Anne, Alison, and Luc's grandfather, while many more people tune in to the game on radio and television. Along with the "sponsorship" of a local butchery patched onto their jerseys, the teammates also sew on messages of tribute and support to their family and friends. The game begins, and the rival team from Double Bay, consisting of rugby legends Rob Wishart, Brett Kenny, Brad Clyde, and Cliff Lyons initially gain the upper hand and lead by eight points, however, in the second half, the Schooners manage to draw the game. The team is faced with the prospect that they will lose the match if the score stays the same, as Double Bay scored first, and the loss of one of their players to a concussion. However, the team manage to score a try in the final 30 seconds of the game, and they eventually go on to win the match.

At the end of the film, Donald and Shane use the ute to create a new rubbish pickup business, and Luc regains full custody of his sister. The seven also end up in the Lowes modelling job.

== Cast ==
Actor	Role
Anh Do	Luc Vu
Angus Sampson	Lloydy
Lisa Saggers	Anne
Paul Nakad	Walid
Steven Rooke	Terry
Emma Lung	Jasmyne
Peter Phelps	Billy Major
Claudia Karvan	Alison Berry
Andrew Voss	Himself
Matty Johns	Himself
Rod Wishart	Himself
Brett Kenny	Himself
Brad Clyde	Himself
Cliff Lyons	Himself
Mario Fenech	Himself

The film also features cameos from such ex-footballers Rod Wishart, Brett Kenny, Brad Clyde and Cliff Lyons, who play for Double Bay, the team that Vu's Yagoona defeat in the final in the film. The film also features a team called the Dubbo Dingoes which features Damion Hunter, a star indigenous actor.

== Box office ==
Footy Legends grossed $557,331 at the box office in Australia.

== See also ==
- Better Man
- Schapelle
