= Better Man (miniseries) =

Australian miniseries

- Screenplay by: Khoa Do
- Directed by: Khoa Do
- Starring: Remy Hii; Jordan Rodrigues; David Wenham; Bryan Brown; Claudia Karvan
- Music by: Matteo Zingales
- Country of origin: Australia
- Original language: English
- No. of episodes: 4

Production
- Producer: Stephen Corvini
- Cinematography: Peter A. Holland ACS
- Editor: Rodrigo Balart
- Production company: Fremantle Media Australia

Original release
- Network: SBS TV
- Release: 25 July – 1 August 2013

Better Man is a four-part Australian television biopic mini-series which originally screened on SBS TV on 25 July 2013, and replayed in February 2014. It was written and directed by Khoa Do and produced by Stephen Corvini. It starred David Wenham, Bryan Brown, Claudia Karvan and newcomer Remy Hii. According to SBS, Better Man had the most "star studded lineup" in the network's history.

== Synopsis ==
Better Man is based on the true story of Van Tuong Nguyen, a 25-year-old Vietnamese-Australian man who was arrested in Singapore, convicted of drug trafficking, sentenced to death in 2004, and subsequently hanged in 2005.

The series follows the story of a young man who had a tough but loving upbringing with his twin brother and devoted mother. The story culminates in a three-year legal battle to save the life of Nguyen, led by Julian McMahon, a Melbourne lawyer, and Lex Lasry QC, a Melbourne barrister.

== Cast ==
- Remy Hii as Van Tuong Nguyen
- David Wenham as Julian McMahon
- Bryan Brown as Lex Lasry
- Jordan Rodrigues as Khoa Nguyen
- Hien Nguyen (real life mother of Khoa Do) as Kim Nguyen
- Claudia Karvan as McMahon's wife Bernadette
- Aileen Huynh as Kelly Ng
- Carmel Rose as Rachel
- Sachin Joab as Inspector Ramesh
- Felino Dolloso as Alan
- Terry Lim as Father Giang
- Mahesh Jadu as Shanmugam Murugesu
- Greg Stone as Drennan, AFP
- Edwina Royce as the McMahons' daughter Angie
- Nhung Kate as Vy, Van Tuong Nguyen's lover

== Production ==
=== Development ===
Better Man was researched and developed by Stephen Corvini, Khoa Do and Timothy Hobart for over three years prior to the series’s production. Van’s lawyer Julian McMahon was a consultant on the miniseries as were Van’s closest confidantes prior to his execution, his best friends Kelly Ng, Bronwyn Lew, and Goldgan Ng. All four had been present during Van’s final visit.

Better Man was written by Do based on extensive interviews, Van’s personal letters, court transcripts, his arrest statements and his clemency appeal.

=== Filming ===
Production and filming took place in Melbourne, Australia and Ho Chi Minh City, Vietnam October–December 2012. Scenes depicting Singapore Changi Airport, Changi Prison and the courtroom in the High Court of Singapore, among other settings, were all filmed in Melbourne with the Cambodian and Vietnamese scenes being filmed in Vietnam.

== Episodes ==
No.	Title	Directed by	Written by	Original release date
1	"Lion Block"	Khoa Do	Khoa Do	25 July 2013
2	"Twin Dragons"	Khoa Do	Khoa Do	25 July 2013
3	"A Lost Lamb"	Khoa Do	Khoa Do	1 August 2013
4	"The Last Dance"	Khoa Do	Khoa Do	1 August 2013

== Controversy ==
Van Tuong Nguyen's family had stated that the series had "reopened old wounds", and his mother, Kim, had declined to contribute to the development of the project and called for the film maker to drop the project. Additionally, Lex Lasry, who acted as a lawyer for Nguyen prior to his execution in 2005, condemned the series, calling it an "untruthful soap opera" and saying that it continued to cause stress to the family. Subsequently, SBS inserted a disclaimer stating that the Nguyen family "had no direct participation" in filming of the movie.

== Reception ==
Better Man received glowing reviews, with critics commenting on the exceptional performances of the cast and the gripping nature of Do's storytelling. David Knox in TV Tonight called the show "the best local drama of the year", Dianne Butler in The Herald Sun praised it as "the most gripping TV drama of the year", The Australian's Lyndall Crisp selected Better Man as its "pick of the week" and mentioned that Better Man was "harrowing but well worth watching". The Sydney Morning Herald's Gordon Farrer also selected Better Man as its "Show of the Week" and praised the production, stating that Better Man's "script is sharp and moving; the direction is confident and effective. This is a moving story that gains power from the telling. Compulsory viewing". TV Tonight also listed Better Man in its "Top 5 Shows of 2013", and ranked it number one in Australian television shows for the year.

== See also ==
- Schapelle (TV film)
- Footy Legends
- Schapelle Corby
- Bali Nine
- Devil's Dust
