= Leongatha mushroom murders =

2023 mushroom poisoning in Victoria, Australia

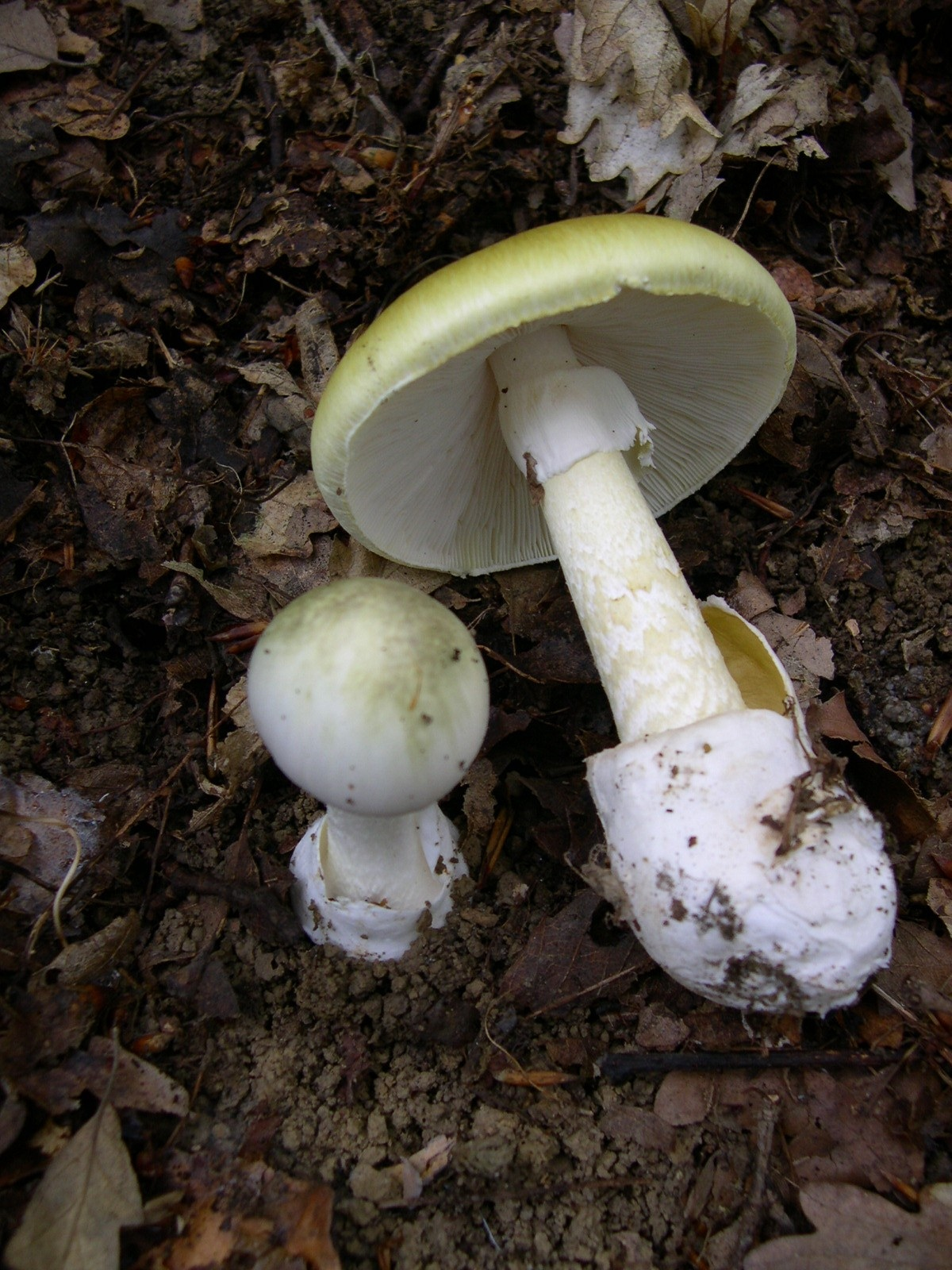
- Death cap mushrooms (Amanita phalloides), the species used to poison the victims
- Location: Leongatha, Victoria, Australia
- Date: 29 July 2023 (AEST)
- Target: Family members at the lunch
- Attack type: Mushroom poisoning
- Deaths: 3
- Injuries: 1
- Victims: Gail Patterson; Don Patterson; Heather Wilkinson; Ian Wilkinson (survived)
- Perpetrator: Erin Trudi Patterson
- Verdict: Guilty (all counts)
- Convictions: 1. Murder (3 counts); 2. Attempted murder (1 count)
- Sentence: 1. 3 life sentences without parole (October 2026); 2. 25 years' imprisonment (September 2025); All sentences are being served concurrently
- Judge: Christopher Beale

On 29 July 2023, Erin Trudi Patterson murdered three of her relatives and seriously injured a fourth by serving beef Wellingtons containing highly toxic death cap mushrooms, during a lunch at her home in Leongatha, Victoria, Australia.

Within 24 hours, all four victims were admitted to hospital and subsequently diagnosed with severe liver failure. Three died within six days (in one case despite receiving a liver transplant), and one recovered seven weeks after the lunch.

Patterson was arrested on 2 November 2023 and charged with three counts of murder and five counts of attempted murder of her in-laws and their relatives, including four counts of attempted murder of her estranged husband Simon. After the charges of attempted murder of Simon were dropped, Patterson was tried before a jury in the Supreme Court of Victoria, sitting in Morwell, commencing on 29 April 2025. On 7 July 2025, the jury convicted Patterson on all remaining charges. On 8 September 2025, Justice Christopher Beale sentenced her to life imprisonment with a non-parole period of 33 years. It was the first sentencing hearing in Victoria to be broadcast live.

The case received extensive media coverage, both in Australia and around the world. A book about the murders and the trial published in 2025, titled The Mushroom Tapes, co-authored by Helen Garner, Chloe Hooper, and Sarah Krasnostein, won the 2026 ABIA General Nonfiction Book of the Year.

In August 2026 Patterson's lawyers argued for a retrial on several grounds including jurors mingling with hotel guests while being sequestered, alleged "unfair and oppressive" cross-examination, and evidence claimed to be irrelevant and prejudicial. Prosecutors also appealed the sentence given, calling it "manifestly inadequate" and arguing for the removal of the parole period in Patterson's sentence due to the seriousness of her crimes. In October 2026, the Court of Appeal dismissed Patterson's appeal against conviction and allowed the crown's appeal against sentence, resulting in her sentence being increased to life imprisonment without the possibility of parole. She became the second woman in Australian history to receive such a sentence.

== Background ==
=== Early life and education ===
Erin Trudi Patterson (née Scutter; born 30 September 1974) grew up in the south-eastern Melbourne suburb of Glen Waverley. Her father was a civil servant and her mother worked as an academic and lecturer.

In 1992, Scutter was accepted for a science course at the University of Melbourne and later switched to accounting. She also trained to be an air traffic controller and graduated in 2001.

=== Early career ===
Following her graduation, Scutter worked as an air traffic controller with Airservices Australia in Melbourne between February 2001 and November 2002. By 2004, Scutter worked as an animal management employee for RSPCA Australia at the Monash City Council's headquarters. In the same year, she began dating Simon Patterson, who worked as an engineer at Monash City Council.

=== Marriage and family life ===
In July 2006, Scutter inherited AU$2 million from her grandmother, which was paid to her over an eight-year period commencing in 2007. Scutter married Simon Patterson in 2007 and they moved to Western Australia, living in Perth, York, and Pemberton. Scutter, now Erin Patterson, ran a second-hand bookshop in Pemberton while her husband worked for the local council. While living in Western Australia, she gave birth to their son. She subsequently testified that she bonded with Gail and Don Patterson, her parents-in-law, during this period.

Prior to the birth of their daughter, the Pattersons relocated to Koonwarra, Victoria, to be closer to her in-laws. According to Simon Patterson, Erin had bonded with her father-in-law Don over a "shared love of knowledge and learning" and that she liked his "gentle nature". Erin attended a Baptist church whose pastor, Ian Wilkinson, was married to Gail Patterson's sister, Heather. Erin and Simon later had a second child.

Erin Patterson's father died from cancer c. 2011, and, in 2019, her mother also died from cancer. She and her sister inherited her parents' estate, which included an A$900,000 beachfront retirement home in Eden, New South Wales. Patterson's share of her parents' estate allowed her and Simon to provide interest-free loans to his three siblings and their spouses to buy homes.

=== Family conflict ===
Erin's relationship with Simon began to deteriorate following the birth of their first child. The couple underwent several short-term separations before reaching long-term split and a financial settlement in 2015. Following their separation, Erin and Simon shared custody of their two children and remained on friendly terms, including going on holidays together.

In 2022, Erin and Simon's relationship deteriorated after he filed a tax return which listed himself as single. Due to this change in his relationship status, Erin became ineligible for government child support payments, with Simon being told by a federal government agency to stop paying his children's school fees and medical bills. While Simon claimed that this change in status was the result of a mistake by his accountant, the incident damaged the couple's relationship.

Between November 2021 and September 2022, Simon was hospitalised three times with gastrointestinal symptoms, with the second incident resulting in a coma and requiring life-saving surgery. A medical expert's report commissioned for the trial stated that Simon's symptoms were consistent with the ingestion of barium carbonate, an ingredient in rat poison. These details were suppressed for the duration of Erin's murder trial.

In the two years leading up to the family lunch on 29 July 2023, Erin had become estranged from her in-laws. According to her brother-in-law Matthew Patterson's court testimony, Erin missed several family events and attended some others only briefly. During her testimony, Erin alleged that she had been snubbed when she received a late invitation to her mother-in-law Gail's 70th birthday celebration around May 2023. Erin had also posted several social media messages to her online friends criticising her estranged husband and in-laws.

== Lunch and deaths ==
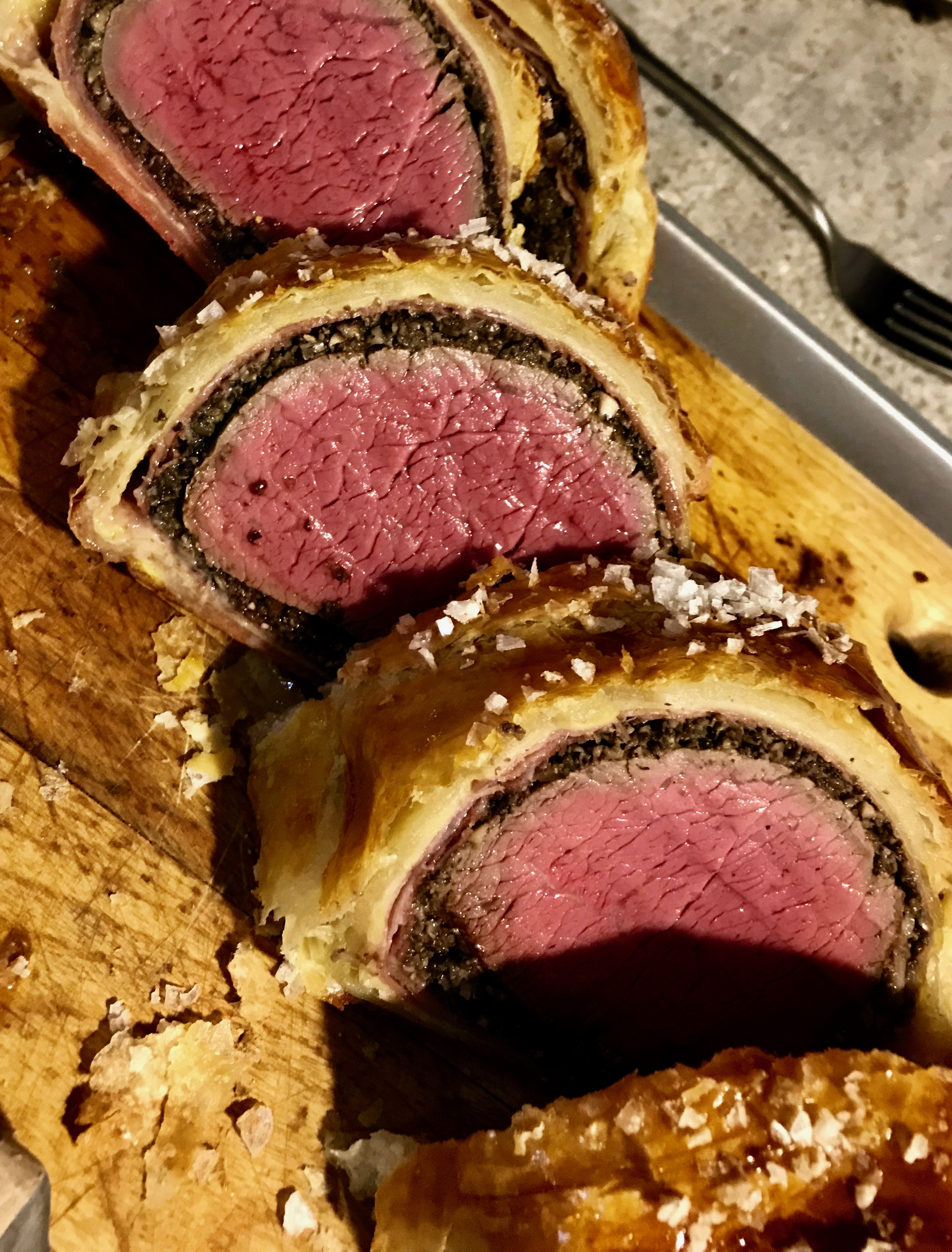
A beef Wellington

On 29 July 2023, at her home in Leongatha, Erin Patterson cooked individual beef Wellington pies for a lunch for her in-laws Don and Gail Patterson, Gail's sister Heather Wilkinson, and Heather's husband Ian. Her estranged husband, Simon Patterson (separated around 2020), was invited but did not attend. Erin Patterson claims her two children went to the cinema at the time of the lunch. The meal contained Amanita phalloides, commonly known as “death cap” mushrooms due to their highly toxic nature.

The following day, all four guests were admitted to hospital with suspected gastroenteritis. Erin Patterson went to Leongatha Hospital with reported stomach pains and diarrhoea, but repeatedly refused to be admitted. Doctors were so concerned for her welfare that they called the police. There were further health concerns for Erin and Simon's children, who purportedly ate leftovers of the beef Wellingtons (with the mushrooms and pastry removed), and doctors were adamant that the children should also be checked for any adverse reactions. It was suggested that Erin was initially reluctant to seek medical attention for the children.

On 4 August 2023, six days after the lunch, Gail Patterson (aged 70) and Heather Wilkinson (aged 66) died in hospital and an investigation was launched by Victoria Police. On 5 August, Don Patterson (aged 70) died in hospital, despite receiving a liver transplant.

Ian Wilkinson (aged 69) remained hospitalised for over seven weeks and survived. He was discharged on 23 September. A funeral for his wife was held on 4 October.

== Police investigation ==
Police confirmed on 14 August that Erin Patterson had provided them with a detailed statement, in which she said she had bought dried mushrooms from an Asian supermarket in the Melbourne suburb of Mount Waverley (around 118 kilometres (73 mi) away from Leongatha) three months before the lunch.

Patterson also said in the statement that she intentionally disposed of the food dehydrator that police found in a skip bin at a transfer station in Koonwarra after, she said, people "began accusing her of intentionally poisoning the meal".

== Legal proceedings and trial ==
Patterson was arrested on 2 November 2023 and charged with three counts of murder and five counts of attempted murder of her in-laws and their relatives, including four counts of attempted murder of her estranged husband Simon.

Patterson appeared in Latrobe Valley Magistrates' Court in Morwell on 3 November 2023. On 7 May 2024, she pleaded not guilty to the three murder charges and five attempted murder charges. Four of the attempted murder charges alleged she had repeatedly targeted her ex-husband Simon, but those charges were subsequently dropped. Patterson was tried in the Supreme Court of Victoria before a jury, presided over by Justice Christopher Beale. At the defendant's request the trial was held in Morwell, rather than Melbourne. The trial began on 29 April 2025 and covered three charges of murder and one charge of attempted murder.

=== Opening arguments ===
During the trial, Crown prosecutor Nanette Rogers focused on Erin Patterson's dehydrator and told the court that she lied when she told police she had never owned one. The court was shown Patterson's Facebook posts sharing photos of a dehydrator along with dehydrated mushrooms. The Crown detailed Patterson's purchase of the dehydrator and subsequent trips in April 2023 to Loch and Outtrim, known death cap mushroom habitats. The Crown presented CCTV footage of Patterson dumping the dehydrator at the Koonwarra Transfer Station after the lunch. The Crown noted that police had forensically examined the retrieved dehydrator and found Patterson's fingerprints and traces of Amanita phalloides mushroom toxins, which were also detected in urine samples of Patterson's male guests. The Crown suggested that Erin Patterson had not eaten the same meal as her alleged victims; had lied about her cancer diagnosis (the pretext on which she had invited the guests); and had lied about experiencing stomach pains and diarrhoea following the lunch. The Crown also suggested that Patterson had lied about having serious medical issues to ensure that her children were not present at the lunch. The Crown stated that trying to prove that Patterson had a motive would not be part of their case.

Erin Patterson's counsel Colin Mandy acknowledged her lie to police about not owning a food dehydrator or foraging for mushrooms, but argued that his client had panicked after learning that her lunch guests died. The defence counsel accepted the Crown's argument that Patterson had never been diagnosed with ovarian cancer. Mandy stated that Patterson was close to her children and to the victims, her parents-in-law. Mandy did not dispute that death cap mushrooms had caused the deaths of the lunch guests, but argued that Patterson did not intend harm to anyone that day, and that the victims' deaths were a "tragedy and terrible accident".

=== Trial evidence ===
The Crown presented several witnesses including Patterson's husband Simon Patterson, Ian Wilkinson, child protection practitioner Katrina Cripps, and several medical personnel who attended to Patterson and her family. The court also heard video testimony from her children. In addition, the prosecution presented several expert witnesses including the mycologists Thomas May and Camille Truong, the toxicologist Dr Dimitri Gerostamoulos, Plant Health Australia diagnostics manager David Lovelock, digital forensic science expert Matthew Sorell, and Victorian Police digital forensics officer Shamen Fox-Henry. The court also heard from several Police personnel including Detective Senior Constable Khuong Tran, Detective Sergeant Luke Farrell, and Detective Leading Senior Constable Stephen Eppingstall.

The defence's sole witness was Erin Patterson, who acknowledged that she and Simon had separated between 2009 and 2015 but that their relationship had improved by 2023. She acknowledged foraging for mushrooms in the Leongatha and Korumburra areas but said that the foraged mushrooms had ended up in the lunch due to a labelling mistake. Patterson also admitted lying about her cancer diagnosis and claimed that she had been too embarrassed to tell her relatives that she was about to get gastric bypass surgery to deal with her weight. She testified that she had organised the lunch in order to bolster relations with the wider Patterson family, who she feared were becoming distant due to her separation from her husband, and that she had vomited following the lunch after eating a cake that her husband's mother had brought. She also said that she experienced diarrhoea for several days after the lunch and had taken drugs to treat the symptoms.

During cross-examination, Patterson denied that she had deliberately cultivated the death cap mushrooms, purposely placing them in the beef Wellingtons and weighing them to calculate the fatal dose for a person. She said she lied to the police and health authorities about dehydrating mushrooms and food because she was afraid of being blamed for the mushroom poisonings. Patterson admitted lying about medical appointments including a needle biopsy. She also denied accessing posts in May 2022 about death cap mushrooms on the platform iNaturalist, despite the Crown presenting a report from data extracted from Patterson's computer showing that the Bing search engine was used to search for iNaturalist over the same timeframe.

Patterson denied she attempted to "cover her tracks" after discharging herself from Leongatha hospital against medical advice on 1 August 2023. She also disputed Ian Wilkinson's testimony that she had used a different-coloured plate from her guests and denied making a sixth beef Wellington for her estranged husband Simon in case he attended the lunch. She also disputed testimony by medical staff that she was reluctant to allow her children to be tested for poisoning. Patterson also denied misleading health authorities when she initially claimed that she had bought the death cap mushrooms from an Asian grocer. She denied lying that Simon Patterson had accused her of poisoning his parents with a dehydrator a few days after the lunch. Patterson also rejected the Crown's argument that she had factory-reset her mobile phone four times in August 2023 to conceal evidence.

=== Closing arguments ===
The Crown's closing arguments to the jury were that Patterson, over the course of several months prior to the 29 July lunch, fabricated her cancer claim as a means of inviting her guests over for lunch, deliberately incorporated death cap mushrooms into the meal served to her guests while ensuring that neither she nor her children consumed the poisoned food, pretended to have diarrhoea following the lunch to make it appear that she had suffered from death cap poisoning, and engaged in a "sustained cover up" to conceal her role in poisoning her guests including lying about the origins of the mushrooms served in the meal and attempting to dispose of her food dehydrator at a landfill; lied about her level of cooperation with health authorities; invited her lunch guests as a gesture of friendship; had never told her guests that she had been diagnosed with cancer; planned gastric bypass surgery; and questioned testimony that Patterson had experienced diarrhoea after eating cake following that lunch.

The closing arguments to the jury, as presented by Patterson's counsel over three days, were that Patterson had accidentally added death cap mushrooms to the meal; there was a reasonable possibility that Patterson had not intended to kill or cause serious injury to her guests; human memory could be faulty, questioning the account of prosecution witness Kylie Ashton; the Crown's evidence about Patterson's conflicts with her estranged husband and in-laws were erroneous, including reliance on a social media conversation in December 2022 that criticised her in-laws; defended the credibility of Patterson's testimony; the testimony from lunch survivor Ian Wilkinson that Patterson served the guests on four large grey plates while eating from a different coloured plate was of no consequence; Patterson's online searches for death cap mushrooms reflected "idle curiosity" rather than malevolent intentions; the Crown's arguments that Patterson committed murder without a motive, lied about her cancer to lure her guests, and thought she could pass off the poisoning as a gastrointestinal infection, should be rejected; Patterson panicked and lied after her estranged husband accused her of poisoning his parents; the Crown's argument that Patterson had either disposed or factory-reset her original mobile phone to conceal her tracks should be rejected; and that Patterson's medical tests from two days after the lunch showed that she had become unwell after consuming the beef Wellington meal, stating that the test recorded low potassium and elevated haemoglobin and fibrinogen levels.

=== Verdict ===
After reserve jurors were excused, the twelve remaining jurors were sequestered for the duration of their deliberations. On 7 July 2025, they returned their verdict, finding Patterson guilty of three counts of murder and one count of attempted murder.

On 30 July 2025, the Supreme Court of Victoria barred Patterson from selling her home in Leongatha, to potentially satisfy any future claims for compensation or restitution.

=== Sentencing ===
Justice Beale heard victim impact statements from relatives on 25 August, and on 8 September sentenced Patterson to three life sentences plus 25 years of imprisonment, all to be served concurrently. She was originally slated to become eligible for parole in 2056.

Patterson was imprisoned at the Dame Phyllis Frost Centre in western Melbourne.

=== Appeals ===
On 2 October 2025, Patterson's new barrister, Richard Edney, announced that she would appeal the guilty verdicts; the grounds of appeal were not outlined at the time. At the same time, human rights lawyer Julian McMahon was added to Patterson's legal team; McMahon had previously acted as a lawyer for Van Tuong Nguyen, who was executed in Singapore for drug trafficking in 2005.

On 6 October, the Victorian Director of Public Prosecutions confirmed it would appeal Patterson's sentence, describing it as "manifestly inadequate."

On 3 November 2025, the Court of Appeal granted leave for Patterson to appeal her guilty verdict.

In mid-August 2026, Patterson's lawyers argued for a retrial on seven points, including the following: a) they suggested that the jurors could have mingled with other hotel guests while being sequestered, b) they alleged that the prosecutor's cross-examination of the defendant was "unfair and oppressive," and c) they claimed that the Crown's evidence was irrelevant and allegedly "prejudiced" the case. Meanwhile, prosecutors appealed Patterson's sentencing as "manifestly inadequate" and argued that her life sentence should contain no parole provisions due to the gravity of her crimes.

In October 2026, the Court of Appeal rejected Patterson's appeal and increased her sentence to life in prison without parole. This made her only the second woman in Australian history to receive this sentence, the first being Katherine Knight in 2000.

== Media coverage ==
=== News outlets ===
The Leongatha mushroom poisoning case and Patterson's arrest and arraignment in early November 2023 attracted significant domestic and international media attention. Six media film crews attended Patterson's arraignment at the Morwell courthouse on 3 November. Victoria Police inspector Dean Thomas said that the police investigation had been "subject to incredibly intense levels of public scrutiny and curiosity" by local, national and international media over the past three months. Notable international media covering the case included The Washington Post, BBC News, the Los Angeles Times, CNN, People magazine, The New York Times and NBC. The Victoria Supreme Court imposed strict guidelines on media coverage to ensure fairness. Although the trial was open to the public and media, the trial itself was not televised.

Morwell's hotels and motels were inundated by the large media contingent. Media productions featuring the case included a Stan documentary series, the Australian Broadcasting Corporation's Mushroom Case Daily, the Herald Sun's The Mushroom Cook: The Trial and Nine Entertainment's The Mushroom Trial: Say Grace podcast series.

British current affairs magazine The Spectator described the trial as Australia's "trial of the century", observing that media coverage drew media and public attention away from the aftermath of the 2025 Australian federal election. On 4 July 2025, the ABC confirmed that it was working on a true crime drama series about Patterson called Toxic. The series would be produced by Tony Ayres and written by Elise McCredie, with ABC journalist Rachael Brown serving as a consultant.

Patterson's guilty verdict on 7 July 2025 attracted extensive coverage in Australian and international news outlets. Following the trial, Seven Network confirmed that it would be releasing a Spotlight Special current affairs episode featuring experts' perspectives on the Patterson mushroom murder trial. Nine Network also confirmed that it was producing a documentary for its streaming service Stan focusing on the trial.

In late September 2025, Seven News reported Patterson's red MG SUV was listed on Facebook marketplace for $18,500 by her lawyer, before being quickly removed after receiving media attention.

=== Other media ===
Between September and December 2025, Australian streaming platform Stan aired a three-part documentary series of the murders and subsequent trial of Patterson titled Revealed: Death Cap Murders. The series was directed by Emmy-nominated director Gil Marsden, and had major investment from Screen Australia as well as financing from VicScreen.

The 2025 book The Mushroom Tapes was co-authored by Helen Garner, Chloe Hooper, and Sarah Krasnostein. It is a record of a series of their conversations, as they evaluate the evidence, guess at possible motivations, and discuss what they have observed of the people and events around the court case. It also looks at why both audiences or readers are "so fascinated with true crime". The book was shortlisted for the 2026 for the Indie Book Awards Book of the Year – Non-Fiction award, and won the 2026 ABIA General Nonfiction Book of the Year.

Many podcasts also discussed the case.

It was reported in October 2026 that Paramount+ ordered Mushroom Murders, a six-part miniseries that follows the case, starring Melanie Lynskey as Erin Patterson. It is created by Anya Beyersdorf, Deb Balderstone, and Daina Reid who is also the director of all six episodes. Beyersdorf serves as writer, alongside Dianne Taylor and Belinda Chayko.
