= Christopher Beale =

Justice in the Supreme Court of Victoria, Australia

Christopher William Beale

Judge of the Supreme Court of Victoria
- In office 2 September 2014-19 December 2025

Personal details
- Occupation: Judge, lawyer

Christopher William Beale is a retired judge of the Supreme Court of Victoria. He was appointed on 2 September 2014, sitting mainly in the criminal division of that court.

Beale's career in criminal law began in 1986 when he became a duty lawyer for the Legal Aid Commission of Victoria. He joined the Victorian Bar in 1988, and in 2007 was appointed a Crown Prosecutor. He returned to the Bar in 2011, and was appointed Senior Counsel in 2012 and King's Counsel in 2013. As a Supreme Court judge, Justice Beale was responsible for delivering the judgement in the high-profile manslaughter of Karen Ristevski.

In 2018, during the criminal proceedings against a man accused of plotting a Christmas Day terrorism attack, Justice Beale's decision to ban the wife of the accused from the court's public gallery gained significant media coverage. The judge banned the woman from seeing her husband's proceedings due to the fact that she was wearing a niqāb. Justice Beale said "whilst all are welcome in my court, spectators in the public gallery must have their faces uncovered, chiefly for security reasons" and that "once there are multiple spectators in the public gallery wearing niqabs and traditional Islamic dress, working out who was who if something happened in court might not be a simple matter, especially as such dress tends to be very similar."

Justice Beale presided over the high-profile case regarding the 2023 Leongatha mushroom poisoning, involving three counts of murder and one count of attempted murder against Erin Patterson. Patterson was accused of the poisoning of her lunch guests with death cap mushrooms in a Beef Wellington she prepared in July 2023, and was found guilty on all four counts on 7 July 2025. Justice Beale sentenced Patterson to life imprisonment on each of the three counts of murder, and a 25 year sentence for attempted murder. He also fixed a non-parole period of 33 years on her sentence.

He retired as a judge on the 19th of December 2025.
