= The Finished People =

- Directed by: Khoa Do
- Written by: Khoa Do; Rodney Anderson; Mylinh Dinh; Daniela Italiano; Joe Le; Shane Macdonald; Jason McGoldrick; Sarah Vongmany
- Produced by: Anh Do
- Starring: Rodney Anderson; Joe Le; Jason McGoldrick; Daniela Italiano; Mylinh Dinh; Sarah Vongmany; Shane Macdonald
- Cinematography: Oliver Lawrance; Murray Lui/camera assistant = Guido Gonzalez
- Edited by: Alison McSkimming Croft
- Music by: Abigail Hatherley
- Production company: Post 75 Productions
- Release date: 23 October 2003
- Running time: 80 minutes
- Country: Australia
- Language: English

The Finished People is a 2003 drama about three youths living on the streets of Cabramatta, New South Wales. The film follows the stories of the three main characters; Des, Van and Tommy. The film started out in June 2002 while Rodney, Joe, Jason and Shane were attending classes at a youth services organization called Open Family based in Cabramatta, New South Wales.

== Cast ==
- Rodney Anderson as Des
- Joe Le as Van
- Jason McGoldrick as Tommy
- Daniela Italiano as Carla
- Mylinh Dinh as Sara
- Sarah Vongmany as Sophie
- Shane Macdonald as Simon
- Ivan Topic as Boss
- Viet Dang as Geoff

== Box office ==
The Finished People grossed $75,431 at the box office in Australia.

== See also ==
- Cinema of Australia
