= Julian McMahon (barrister) =

Australian barrister

- Born: Julian P McMahon
- Occupation: Barrister

Julian P McMahon AC is an Australian barrister, who has been the lawyer for Van Tuong Nguyen and members of the Bali Nine. He currently serves as the president of the Capital Punishment Justice Project (formerly Reprieve Australia), an organisation which aims to provide legal representation and humanitarian assistance to those at risk of execution.

== Early life and education ==
McMahon completed secondary school at St. Ignatius' College, Riverview in 1981. He then began studies at the University of Melbourne in 1986, where he was a resident at Trinity College. McMahon was a member of the college debating club known as the Dialectic Society. He graduated with a Bachelor of Arts with Honours in 1987, and a Bachelor of Laws in 1990. He later obtained a Master of Laws degree from Monash University in 1998.

== Career ==
McMahon was admitted to practice as a solicitor in 1992, and worked for Sly and Weigall and then the Office of Public Prosecutions. He was admitted to the Victorian Bar in 1998, and specialises in criminal and human rights law. He describes his chambers as having a history of "looking after people who no-one else really wants to defend".

McMahon opposes the use of the death penalty internationally, and challenged Australian citizen Van Nguyen's execution by Singapore in 2005, along with Lex Lasry QC.

McMahon has represented the Australian citizens Andrew Chan and Myuran Sukumaran, convicted of drug trafficking in Bali, Indonesia. McMahon, along with a team of lawyers including Todung Mulya Lubis have helped their clients prepare clemency requests, and has launched judicial reviews in an attempt to overturn their death sentences. McMahon visited the pair in Nusakambangan Island, requesting family access. In a comment to SBS Dateline, McMahon stated "they help Indonesians in prison become better people, the idea of killing two young men who do that day in and day out is just ridiculous.”

In 2025, McMahon was enlisted as a lawyer for Erin Patterson, who was convicted of murdering three people and attempting to murder a fourth after serving them beef Wellingtons laced with death cap mushrooms and subsequently sentenced to three concurrent life sentences in September that year.

== Honours ==
McMahon was named Victorian Australian of the Year in 2016 for his work as a barrister, human rights advocate and fierce opponent of the death penalty.

In the 2017 Queen's Birthday Honours, McMahon was made a Companion of the Order of Australia (AC), Australia's highest civilian honour.
