= Khoa Do =

Australian director and writer (born 1979)

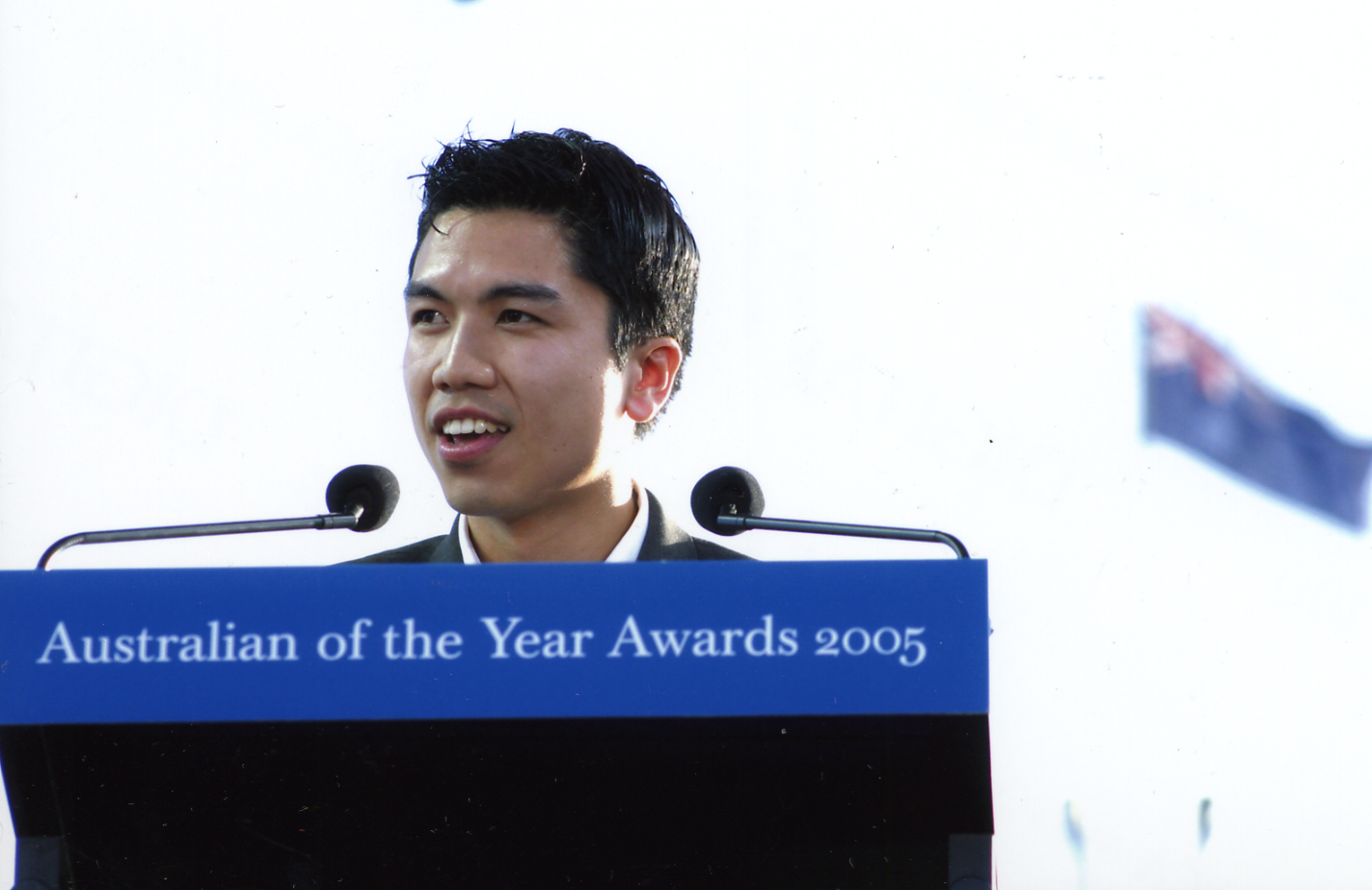
- Khoa Do at the 2005 Australian of the Year Awards
- Born: Đỗ Khoa; 1979 (age 46–47); Ho Chi Minh City, Vietnam
- Occupations: Film director; Screenwriter; Speaker; Philanthropist
- Relatives: Anh Do (brother)

Khoa Do (Vietnamese: Đỗ Khoa, pronounced [ɗǒwˀ kʰʷāː]), is an Australian film director and screenwriter. He received the Young Australian of the Year Award in 2005.

== Early life and family ==
The Do family left Vietnam in 1980 as Vietnamese refugees, fleeing Saigon by boat. At the age of 19 months, Khoa narrowly escaped death at the hands of Thai pirates. They arrived in Sydney in August 1980. Do received a scholarship to attend St Aloysius' College in Milsons Point, graduating in 1996. He studied Law and Arts at the University of Sydney.

His brother is the comedian/author Anh Do. His mother Hien, played the role of Van Nguyen's mother, Kim, in Better Man (2013), a film which he produced but for which he also received criticism from Nguyen's real mother, among others.

== Philanthropy ==
Do has been active in helping the under-privileged in South Western Sydney, especially the Vietnamese community. While at university he worked as an English teacher and job-seeking-skills volunteer among the youth living in Cabramatta. In 2006, Do commenced voluntary work with disadvantaged kids at Cabramatta's Open Family Youth Social Services Centre, after being asked to teach film-making to "at risk" youths.

== Recognition and awards ==
- 2001 Young Citizen of the Year Award (City of Bankstown)
- 2003 – Centenary Medal
- 2005 – Do was named Young Australian of the Year for his "leadership, compassion, and will to inspire and inform Australians on issues that affect our communities".

=== Film industry awards ===
- 2001 – Nominated for an AFI Award for his screen play for the short film Delivery Day
- 2003 – IF Independent Spirit Award for The Finished People
- 2004 – Nominated for two AFI Awards, three Film Critics' Circle Awards and two Australian Writers' Guild Awards for this film and for his community theatre
- 2005 – Powerhouse Wizard Award, which "recognises emerging leaders in Australian innovation and achievement".
- 2008 – Philip Parsons Young Playwrights Award.
- 2009 – DIGISPAA award for his film Missing Water (later released as Mother Fish), and also received the CRC Award for the same film at the Sydney Film Festival. For the same film he has subsequently won prizes at the Orlando Film Festival, Canada International Film Festival and Vietnamese International Film Festival.

== Selected filmography ==
- The Diamond of Jeru (2001, TV)
- The Finished People (2003)
- Footy Legends (2006)
- Delivery Day (2009) – tells the story of a young girl and her struggle to balance the demands of school, her mother and the family's backyard sweatshop and is heavily based on Do's own experience.
- Mother Fish (2010)
- Better Man (2013)
- Schapelle (2014)

Awards
Preceded by Hugh Evans	Young Australian of the Year; 2005	Succeeded by Trisha Broadbridge
