= Jules Faber =

Cartoonist and illustrator

Jules Faber is a cartoonist, caricature artist, illustrator and finished artist located in Coffs Harbour. In 2009, he became President of the Australian Cartoonists' Association and was again elected to the position in November 2012.

Faber's first collection of short stories, poetry and autobiographical comics was published in 2004. He was also co-editor and a major contributor to the Australian anthology Sporadic, a comic featuring many Australian cartoonists with an animation background - Faber was background inker on nine episodes from Season Two of Disney's 'The Proud Family' - a show made for minority groups in the US television industry. Other work includes the science fiction colour comic Golgotha: Book One (2005), the trilogy of 'The Clunkertons' children's books and various newspaper editorial cartooning positions.

Faber's second solo exhibition of works 'Ten Years and a Day' opened at the Verve Cafe in Brisbane's Metro Arts building on 6 February 2008 (?).

He was a DVD reviewer for the website and ill-fated publication What DVD. He is currently delving further into children's book illustration. His most prominent recent work is illustrating the Weirdo series of books written by Anh Do.
