= Anton Emdin =

Australian illustrator (born 1976)

- Born: 2 April 1976 (age 50) Australia
- Areas: Cartoonist, Artist
- Notable works: Cruel World
- Awards: complete list

Anton Emdin (born 2 April 1976) is a freelance illustrator and cartoonist from Sydney, Australia.

== Career ==
Working as a freelance illustrator and cartoonist full-time since 1995, Emdin has drawn for numerous magazines, including the Australian editions of Rolling Stone, FHM, Ralph, People, Penthouse, The Spectator, The Spectator Australia, and MAD (both Australian and US editions).

Emdin also draws editorial illustrations for online news provider The Global Mail.

Amongst a bunch of educationals for schools, Emdin has illustrated various books, standouts being the Graphic Classics series featuring Mark Twain, Robert Louis Stevenson, Ambrose Bierce, and Edgar Allan Poe.

For commercial and advertising illustration work Emdin is represented by The Drawing Book Illustration Agency and has worked with many large advertising agencies such as JWT, Ogilvy, and Saatchi & Saatchi for clients including Macquarie Bank, Luxbet, and Kelloggs, as well as many smaller companies and individuals.

== Minicomics ==
In the early 1990s Emdin started drawing underground comix and collaborated with Ross Tesoriero on his first mini-comic If Pain Persists. Shortly after, Emdin published his own comic, Cruel World, and was one of the first in the Australia underground scene to produce full colour covers and professionally printed pages. Unfortunately the high production value did not reflect the low-brow content — Cruel World ran to issue 8.

Throughout his life, Emdin has continued to draw in the art and underground scene, contributing to books and comic anthologies such as Sick Puppy, Phatsville, Blackguard ', Pure Evil, and most recently, Blood and Thunder.

== Awards ==
- Australian Cartoonists' Association's (ACA) Gold Stanley Award for Cartoonist of the Year 2013
- Australian Cartoonists' Association's (ACA) Stanley Award for Comic Book Artist, 2013
- Australian Cartoonists' Association's (ACA) Stanley Award for Illustrator, 2013
- National Cartoonists Society's (NCS) Reuben Division Award for Magazine Feature / Magazine Illustration, 2012
- Australian Cartoonists' Association's (ACA) Stanley Award for Illustrator, 2012
- Australian Cartoonists' Association's (ACA) Gold Stanley Award for Cartoonist of the Year 2011
- National Cartoonists Society's (NCS) Reuben Division Award for Magazine Feature / Magazine Illustration, 2010
- Australian Cartoonists' Association's (ACA) Stanley Award for Illustrator, 2011
- Australian Cartoonists' Association's (ACA) Stanley Award for Illustrator, 2010
- Desktop CREATE:2010 Awards for Illustration / Typography Category (shortlisted)
- Australian Cartoonists' Association's (ACA) Stanley Award for Illustrator, 2009
- National Cartoonists Society's (NCS) Reuben Division Award for Magazine Feature / Magazine Illustration, 2009 (nominated)
- Australian Cartoonists' Association's (ACA) Stanley Award for Illustrator, 2008 (nominated)
