= Van Tuong Nguyen =

Australian drug trafficker (1980–2005)

- Nguyễn Tường Vân
- Van Tuong Nguyen's mugshot
- Born: 17 August 1980; Songkhla, Thailand
- Died: 2 December 2005 (aged 25); Changi Prison, Singapore
- Other names: Nguyen Tuong Van, Van Nguyen
- Status: Executed by hanging
- Conviction: Drug trafficking
- Penalty: Death (x26)

Van Tuong Nguyen (17 August 1980 – 2 December 2005), baptised Caleb, was an Australian convicted of drug trafficking in Singapore. A Vietnamese Australian, he was also addressed as Nguyen Tuong Van (Vietnamese: Nguyễn Tường Vân, chữ Hán: 阮祥雲) in Singaporean media, his name in Vietnamese custom like most customs in the Sinosphere.

Drug trafficking in Singapore carries a mandatory death sentence under Misuse of Drugs Act, and despite pleas for clemency from the Australian Government, Amnesty International, the Holy See, as well as other individuals and groups, he was executed by hanging at 06:06 SGT on 2 December 2005 at Changi Prison (22:06 UTC, 1 December 2005).

== Biography ==
Van Tuong Nguyen and his twin brother, Dang Khoa Nguyen, were born in a refugee camp at Songkhla in Thailand to Vietnamese parents. He did not know his father until 2001 when he travelled from the United States to Australia. His mother, Kim, is Vietnamese and migrated to Australia shortly after the boys' birth. In 1987, she married a Vietnamese-Australian who beat them often, according to Van.

Van was educated at St Ignatius School in Richmond, St Joseph's Primary School in Springvale and Mount Waverley Secondary College. After leaving school at 18, he intended to study at Deakin University, but financial difficulties led him to work as a store clerk, door-to-door salesman, computer salesman and research marketer.

Van started his own computer sales business in 1999. After his brother Khoa got into legal trouble, Van wound up the business. He then found a sales, research and marketing job and earned between A$1,500 to A$2,500 a month (depending on how much commission he received). He subsequently took long leave between June and December 2002. In his confession, he stated he was on "medication for acne that required 4 months leave".

== Drug trafficking ==
Throughout his trial, Van claimed that he was carrying the drugs in a bid to pay off debts amounting to approximately A$20,000 to A$25,000 that he owed and to repay legal fees his twin brother Khoa (a former heroin addict) had incurred in defending drug-trafficking and other criminal charges including an attack on a Pacific Islander youth with a katana. In addition to his own financial troubles, Van said he tried to help pay his twin brother's debt of A$12,000. His twin brother's loan had to be repaid by the end of 2002. Van could afford to repay only A$4,000, the interest on the loan.

By October 2002, Van had been out of a job for four months and sustaining expenses which included interest on the loan and personal living costs, all totaling A$580 a month. In November 2002, Nguyen was contacted by a Chinese man named "Tan", who told him to travel to Sydney to meet a Vietnamese man named "Sun". Sun proposed that he would repay Nguyen's loans if Nguyen transported packages from Cambodia back to Melbourne and possibly Sydney, via Singapore. The man said the packages contained "white", which Nguyen understood to be heroin.

It was Van's first trip overseas from Australia since his immigration. He reached Phnom Penh at midday on 3 December 2002 after leaving Sydney in the evening of the previous day. He met with a Cambodian man at the Lucky Burger restaurant on 4 December and was taken by car to a garage where he was forced to smoke some powdered heroin. The following day, Van met his associates at the Lucky Burger and was again taken to the garage and ordered by the men to consume heroin, perhaps to help them determine if he was an undercover police officer. Van was instructed to stay in Phnom Penh until 10 December, at which point he was to meet at the Lucky Burger.

On 8 December, he decided to fly to Ho Chi Minh City. On 10 December, he returned to Phnom Penh, but missed his scheduled meeting at the Lucky Burger. On 11 December, he was taken to the garage, where he was then instructed on how to crush heroin bricks and to strap the powdered drug packages to his body. The rest of the day was spent crushing and packaging the drugs in his hotel room. He checked out of the hotel the next day and went to the airport.

=== Arrest and conviction ===
On boarding his flight to Melbourne after a four-hour stopover at Singapore Changi Airport, Van triggered a metal detector. A package of heroin from Cambodia was found strapped to his body. After the first package was discovered, Van informed the airport official about a second package in his luggage.

Van confessed to have in his possession 396.2 grams (13.98 oz) of heroin, more than 26 times the amount of heroin that mandates a death sentence under the Misuse of Drugs Act (import or export of heroin of more than 15 grams or 0.53 ounces). The Singaporean High Court sentenced Van to death for this crime on 20 March 2004. After he was convicted, Van was held on death row in Changi Prison.

An appeal to the Court of Appeal was rejected on 20 October 2004.

Van's family received a registered letter from the Singapore Prison Service, notifying of his scheduled hanging on 2 December 2005.

=== Pleas for clemency ===
After his sentencing in March 2004, anti-death-penalty campaigners were reported to be inundated with emails from Australians offering support for Van. Politicians and religious figures made pleas for clemency, but these were rejected by the Singaporean government.

A plea for clemency by the Australian Government was rejected in October 2005. Members of the federal and state parliaments appealed for the decision to be reconsidered and clemency to be granted. His hanging was the first execution of an Australian citizen in Southeast Asia since 1993, when Michael McAuliffe was hanged in Malaysia for drug trafficking. Nine years earlier, Kevin Barlow and Brian Chambers had been sent to the Malaysian state gallows for their part in a drug smuggling case.

In November 2005, during the 2005 APEC Summit in South Korea, Australian Prime Minister John Howard made a last appeal on Van's behalf to the Singaporean Prime Minister, Lee Hsien Loong. However, Van's mother was already informed of Van's execution date before this appeal. Howard later said he was "very disappointed" that Lee did not inform him of Van's execution date during their meeting that morning. Singapore Foreign Affairs Minister George Yeo also conveyed his apologies to his counterpart Alexander Downer. Van's lawyers arrived in Singapore on 18 November 2005 to inform their client of his impending execution date.

On 21 November 2005, the Australian Government was considering a request made by Van's lawyers to apply for a hearing at the International Court of Justice which required the Singaporean government's agreement to its jurisdiction. However, Foreign Minister Downer considered it unlikely that the Singaporean government would agree. On 24 November 2005, Victorian Attorney General Rob Hulls met with Singapore's Senior Minister of State for Law and Home Affairs Ho Peng Kee to press the case for clemency but was unsuccessful. On 28 November 2005 Australia's Human Rights Commissioner, Sev Ozdowski, said Australia must keep pressuring Singapore to abandon the death penalty, even if it proves too late for Van.

One day before Van was hanged, a lawyer launched a last-ditch legal tactic, charging Van with drug related offences in the Melbourne Magistrates' Court, which he hoped would allow the Australian Federal Government to extradite Van. However, Justice Minister Chris Ellison ruled out extradition, saying that the Commonwealth Director of Public Prosecutions would not have attempted to prosecute Van in Australia due to double jeopardy laws.

=== Media coverage and public opinion ===
ABC broadcast a documentary, Just Punishment, on 7 December 2006. This documentary was filmed over two years, following Van's mother (Kim), his brother and his two close friends, through the appeals, and campaigns held (in Australia) before the execution day. It was rebroadcast on the night of 8 December 2008, also on the ABC.

An opinion poll conducted by Roy Morgan Research two days after Nguyen's execution showed 52% of Australians approved of it, compared with 44% against.

In 2013, SBS TV produced a television drama series about the events surrounding Van's arrest, trial, unsuccessful plea for clemency and execution. Better Man starred David Wenham, Claudia Karvan, Bryan Brown and Remy Hii; and directed by Khoa Do.

=== Vigils ===
A group of human rights activists held a vigil for Van in Singapore on 7 November 2005. Among those present was opposition politician Chee Soon Juan, leader of the Singapore Democratic Party, who is an opponent of the mandatory death penalty.

A request was made by Liberal MP Bruce Baird for an official minute's silence to honour Van. Representatives of the Returned and Services League objected, stating such tributes should be reserved for fallen soldiers or victims of natural disasters; other groups felt it was inappropriate to "honour" a convicted trafficker of drugs which killed hundreds each year. A motion to hold a minute's silence passed in the Legislative Assembly of Queensland 49-18 after an hour's debate. MPs who voted against the move walked out before the observance.

=== Execution ===
Singapore's contract hangman, Darshan Singh, gave an interview to an Australian newspaper prior to the execution in which he said he hoped to be called on to perform the execution and that his experience would ensure Van would be hanged "efficiently". The result was disapprobation in both Australia and Singapore. Van was ultimately hanged by another executioner.

Van was executed at 06:06 SGT on 2 December 2005. He was officially reported as dead at 07:17 SGT by the Ministry of Home Affairs. In a short statement, the Ministry said, "The sentence was carried out this morning at Changi Prison."

Van's body was released to his family and left Changi Prison about four hours after the execution. The body was taken to the Marymount Chapel of the Good Shepherd's Convent in Singapore for a private memorial service at 13:00. The family requested for the media to stay away from the chapel. His family returned to Melbourne with his body on 4 December 2005. A requiem mass was held at St. Patrick's Cathedral on 7 December 2005. Victorian MPs Geoff Hilton, Bruce Mildenhall, Sang Nguyen and Richard Wynne attended the service.

== Response ==
=== Singaporean Government ===
As a transportation hub, Singapore has always been a potential transit point for Golden Triangle heroin. In a letter to David Hawker, the Speaker of the Australian House of Representatives from Abdullah Tarmugi, the Speaker of the Parliament of Singapore, wrote: "He was caught in possession of almost 400 grams of pure heroin, enough for more than 26,000 doses of heroin for drug addicts.... He knew what he was doing and the consequences of his actions. As representatives of the people, we have an obligation to protect the lives of those who could be ruined by the drugs he was carrying."

"We cannot allow Singapore to be used as a transit for illicit drugs in the region," Tarmugi wrote to Australian MPs. "We know this is a painful and difficult decision for Mr Nguyen's family to accept, but we hope you and your colleagues will understand our position."

In an opinion piece in the Sydney Morning Herald, Singapore's High Commissioner in Australia, Joseph Koh, argued that "Singapore cannot afford to pull back from its tough drug trafficking position".

=== Australian Government ===
Australian Prime Minister John Howard used the execution of Van as a warning to young people to stay away from drugs. He told Melbourne radio station 3AW:

I don't believe in capital punishment; he was a convicted drug trafficker and that is to be wholly condemned ... don't have anything to do with drugs. Don't use them, don't touch them, don't carry them, don't traffic in them and don't imagine for a moment—for a moment—that you can risk carrying drugs anywhere in Asia without suffering the most severe consequences.

Howard felt that the decision by the Singapore Government had damaged relations between the two countries but refused any economic sanctions or any punitive action against Singapore.

Federal Health Minister Tony Abbott also said that the Singapore government's decision to go ahead with the execution was wrong and that the punishment "certainly did not fit the crime.... But people do need to understand that drug trafficking is a very serious offence and it has heavy penalties in Australia and it has even more drastic penalties overseas as we have been reminded today."

On 23 February 2006, the Australian government rejected a bid by Singapore Airlines for permission to fly a permanent route between Sydney and the United States. This drew strong criticism from the government of Singapore. Peter Costello, the Australian Treasurer, denied that the refusal was linked to Van's hanging.

The Australian Government was criticised by some for not taking a stronger approach to opposing Van's execution. Amnesty International was criticised by Howard Glenn and Greg Barns for refusing to work with other human rights groups with various campaigns to prevent Van's execution, but rather asking the public to donate money to Amnesty International.

== See also ==
- Capital punishment for drug trafficking
- Capital punishment in Singapore
- Illegal drug trade
- Better Man (TV miniseries)
- List of Australian criminals
- List of Australians in international prisons
- Leongatha mushroom murders
