= Viet Film Fest =

Vietnamese Biennial film festival

The Viet Film Fest, short form as ViFF is a biennial film festival organized by the non-profits Vietnamese-American Arts & Letters Association (VAALA) and UCLAs VietNamese Language and Culture (VNLC). First started in 2003 as the Vietnamese International Film Festival, ViFF takes place at the University of California, Irvine, the University of California, Los Angeles, and other locations in and near the Little Saigon area of Orange County, California.

Part film festival and part community-service event, to date ViFF is the only film festival reserved for filmmakers of Vietnamese heritage in the world outside of Vietnam.

== VIFF 2003 and 2005 ==
ViFF 2003 and ViFF 2005 showcased 48 and 37 films (both shorts and features), respectively, directed/produced by filmmakers of Vietnamese descent from the U.S., France, Canada, Australia, Germany, and Vietnam. As a result, many films by Vietnamese-heritage filmmakers, both new and previously released, have gathered here. Films by Academy Award nominated director Trần Anh Hùng have been shown at ViFF. Notable premieres at ViFF include the world premiere of Victor Vu's First Morning (Buổi Sáng Đàu Năm), The Rebel, directed by Charlie Nguyen, and the North American premiere of Pham Nhue Giang's Deserted Valley (Thung Lũng Hoang Vắng).

== VIFF 2007 ==
In 2007, the eight-day festival took place from April 12 to April 15 and from April 19, to April 22. If featured record number of films: a total of 51, including 13 features submitted by filmmakers of Vietnamese descent from around the world. The festival opened with the world premiere of the martial arts drama film, The Rebel, directed by Charlie Nguyen and closed with the feature debut, Dust of Life, directed by Le Van Kiet. The Spotlight Program on April 14 showcased screenwriter Nguyen Thi Minh Ngoc, whose work is featured in Living in Fear, directed by Bui Thac Chuyen and Journey From the Fall, a film by Ham Tran.

== VIFF 2009 ==
In 2009, the festival was held on April 2–5 & 9-12, 2009 at UC Irvine.

== VIFF 2011 ==
In 2011, the 5th festival with Reel Momentum is the theme, was held on April 7 to 17, 2011 presented over 60 short and feature movies of 100 received.

The Awards presented at ViFF 2011:

- Grand-jury Trống Đồng Award for best feature film: Bi, Don't be Afraid! (Bi, Đừng sợ !) - directed by Phan Dang Di
- Grand-jury Trống Đồng Award for best short film: Phía Sau Cái Chết (Behind Death), directed by Ta Nguyen Hiep
- Audience Choice Award for best feature film: Touch (directed by Minh Duc Nguyen)
- Audience Choice Award for best short film: Fading Light (Theo Hướng Đèn Mà Đi), directed by Thien Do; and Things You Don’t Joke About, directed by Viet Nguyen
- Spotlight Award : Mother Fish (directed by Khoa Đỗ)

== ViFF 2013 ==
ViFF 2013 ran from April 4–7 & 11-14, 2013 at Edwards University Town Center 6 (Irvine), UC Irvine, UCLA, and Bowers Museum (Santa Ana), with record number of films and audience members.

- Inspiration Award: Tran Anh Hung for his contribution to Vietnamese and world cinema
- Spotlight Awards: Stateless, directed by Duc Nguyen and A Tree Workers Case, directed by Daniela Agostini.
- Grand-Jury Trống Đồng Award for Best Feature: War Witch, directed by Kim Nguyen
- Best Vietnamese Actor: Thai Hoa (In the Name of Love)
- Best Vietnamese Actress: Ngo Thanh Van (House in the Alley)
- Best Cinematographer: Nguyen K’ Linh (Blood Letter)
- Grand-Jury Trống Đồng Award for Best Short Film: Picture. Perfect, directed by Winston Titus Tao
- Audience Choice Award for Best Feature: Mr. Cao Goes to Washington, directed by S. Leo Chiang
- Audience Choice Award for Best Short: Stateless, directed by Duc Nguyen.

== Viet Film Fest 2014 ==
Viet Film Fest (formerly the Vietnamese international Film Festival-ViFF) is now an annual event. The festival moved closer to the heart of the Vietnamese community with a majority of the screenings centralized at the UltraLuxe Cinemas at Anaheim Gardenwalk.

From April 10–13, 2014 Viet Film Fest (formerly the Vietnamese international Film Festival-ViFF) received unprecedented support from the community, with a turnout of about 4,000 attendees over four days.

Viet Film Fest 2014 showcased 29 films, including 8 features and 21 short films, from countries all over the world such as Vietnam, Australia, Canada, England, France, Germany, Japan, the United States, and (for the first time) Korea.

The award recipients this year are:

- Grand-Jury Trống Đồng Award: Funny Money (Tiền Chùa) directed by Thien Do
- Spotlight Award: Number Ten Blues/Goodbye Saigon directed by Norio Osada
- Best Actress: Ninh Dương Lan Ngọc for her performance in Thúy
- Best Actor: Khương Ngọc for his performance in Funny Money (Tiền Chùa)
- Best Short Film: Burn to Send (Đốt Về Trời) directed by AnDinh Ha
- Audience Choice for Best Feature Film: Công Binh: The Last Fighters of Viet Nam directed by Lam Le
- Audience Choice for Best Short Film: Hanoi Fly Boy directed by Viet Phuong Dao

== Viet Film Fest 2015 ==
In 2015, the 8th festival will be held on April 16–19 at UltraLuxe Anaheim Cinemas.
