= Diasporic Vietnamese narratives =

Diasporic Vietnamese narratives refer to the stories, memories, and experiences written about the Vietnamese diaspora. Vietnamese diaspora is the dispersion of Vietnamese people living outside of Vietnam. Scholars indicate that the Vietnamese diaspora is unique because of its complex "historical roots of refugee-exile circumstances." At the same time, Priscilla Koh asserts that "overseas Vietnam" should not be grouped as one massive "undifferentiated category" because periods of departure are not only complex, but their political eras should also be thoughtfully considered. Koh further states that during the 20th century, Vietnam has experienced several instances of "mass emigration" due to war, poverty, opportunities to study abroad, and political changes.

In many cases, narratives of the Vietnamese diasporic community often foregrounds the memories and experiences of the pre-war period, pre-1975 wartime, and post-war refugees, with anti-communist sentiments arising from experiences of communist violence and oppression. Stuart Cunningham and Tina Nguyen state that from 1965 to 1975, during the "height" of the Vietnam War, more than half of Vietnam's population were "displaced internally," being dispersed throughout the world and into "host countries" such as the United States, France, Canada, Australia, or Germany. It was reported that about a hundred thousand Vietnamese were in other countries outside of Vietnam in 1975. According to a 2018 report from the Migration Policy Institute, at the end of the Vietnam War, about 125,000 Vietnamese refugees were evacuated and brought into United States sponsored bases and refugee camps. In 1975, displaced refugees - as they were labeled - from Vietnam, Laos, and Cambodia increased, allowing families to be "admitted" into the United States. The Vietnamese immigration population has increased every decade. The Migration Policy Institute reports that more than 1.3 million Vietnamese relocated to the United States, making the Vietnamese community the sixth largest community to reside in the country. Between the years of 2012 to 2016, immigrants from Vietnam often relocated to California (39%), Texas (13%), and Washington State and Florida (both 4%).

== Narratives ==
Currently, post-war narratives are centralized in both Vietnamese and Vietnamese-American writing, further exemplifying memories of pre-1975 and colonialism through a reflective post-war lens. An emergence of Vietnamese literature, specifically diasporic Vietnamese literature, has become more visible in recent years. This is perhaps due to how Western historians, scholars, and writers often report on the Vietnam War. Ken Burns' and Lynn Novick's documentary about the Vietnam War, a ten-part, eighteen hour documentary that aired on PBS, for example, included personal stories from both U.S. and Vietnamese participants in the war. Even Aimee Phan notes, expectations for the documentary were high because Burns' approach to the topic was going to be different as the producers were aiming to be more inclusive in their documentary, including multiple perspectives and sides of the war, both from South Vietnamese and North Vietnamese soldiers and civilians. However, Phan further notes that she was disappointed with the documentary because Burns and Novick, who both directed the documentary, seemed to re-center the narrative back to "its shiny centers: the white American soldier and his complex feelings of fear, hatred, guilt and remorse." The narrative becomes historically normative, canonical, excluding other perspectives and voices that are considered otherized or othered. Phan further critiques the documentary, asserting:

The little coverage these other voices receive does little to right the balance. Like nearly every movie or book about the war, Vietnamese lives remains in the background, no matter that it is their land, homes and people the war is destroying. American prisoners of war receive significant airtime, while the aftermath of the war and the refugee experience are hardly acknowledged. Little respect is paid to the Vietnamese voices, which are diverse and complicated, and communicate as much pain and regret as the Americans'.

Linda Trinh Võ shares a similar perspective, noticing that whenever she hears anything about the "Vietnam War" in the media, the references are almost never about Vietnamese or Vietnamese-Americans. Because of stereotypes and caricatures created by Western media such as the categorical label of FOB (fresh off the boat), Vietnamese and Vietnamese-Americans find it difficult to situate themselves into their own narratives, theories, research, teachings, or pedagogies. In many cases, they dissociate themselves from their own identities or are completely excluded from their own cultural and historical narratives, which is often an exclusionary practice within academia.

In an op-ed titled, "The Great Vietnam War Novel Was Not Written by an American," published by The New York Times, Viet Thanh Nguyen, author of The Sympathizer and The Refugees argues that several works written by Vietnamese-Americans are often ignored by "the American and Vietnamese mainstream." Nguyen specifically mentions Bao Ninh's novel The Sorrow of War, which Nguyen considers a "North Vietnamese war classic" is a "worthy" historical based novel that is often ignored in mainstream historical canon. He further contends that Vietnamese-American voices are only sporadically visibly "heard here" and then "forgotten" and "rarely heard in Vietnam." Diaspora becomes a poignant focal point in Vietnamese literature. In an interview with diaCRITICS, Viet Thanh Nguyen, who is also the founding editor of diaCRITICS, states that definition of diaspora derives from the displacement and exile of Jewish communities. In the same interview, Nguyen asserts:

There are very strong connotations of an originary homeland, a sense of persecution, and a nostalgic desire for home. If we look at contemporary Jewish and Israeli discourses, there is also a strong sense of essentialism and nationalism, and a potential for both progressive and reactionary politics.

== Themes ==
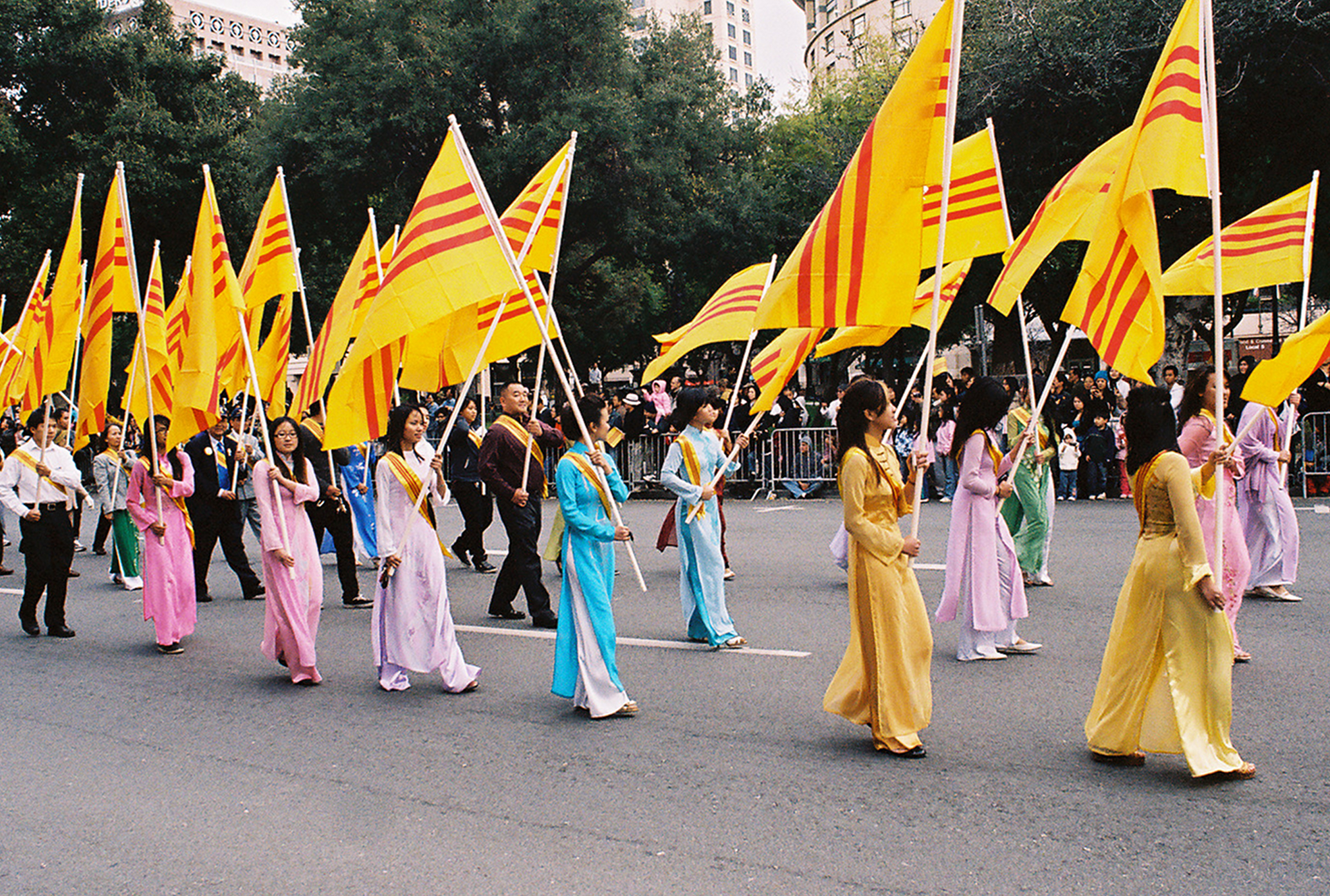
Tết parade in San Jose, 2009

Recurring themes include isolation, displacement, dislocation, alienation, reconciling cultural and generational complexities, identity loss, familial piety and individual autonomy, citizenship, assimilation and acculturation are common in diasporic Vietnamese literature. Such themes explore the complexities of cultural conflicts and raises questions on the complexities of transnational identities.

== Pre-1975 Music: Nhạc Vàng ==
=== The Emergence of Pre-1975 Nhạc Vàng ===
Aside from Vietnamese literature, pre-war and postwar Vietnamese narratives arguably gained mass and public interest through the broadcasting of Vietnamese music. While Vietnamese music encompasses different genres such as nhã nhạc, chèo, dân ca, quan họ, hát chầu văn, ca trù, hò, hát xẩm, and tuồng cải lương, it was arguably pre-1975 music or nhạc vàng (literal translation: golden music) and nhạc tiền chiến (pre-Indochina War music) that highlighted, and eventually archived, the experiences, thoughts, and feelings of civilians through the pre-war, during the war, and post-war eras.

Kieu Linh Caroline Valverde notes that tân nhạc (modern music) was influenced by the "French presence" in the early 19th century. Vietnam was introduced to French music after the French's military occupation of Hà Nội in 1873. Perhaps due to the French colonization, the French “injections” of their popular music became infused with Vietnamese contemporary music, which was increasingly influenced by other cultural and international influences as well. Singers such as Thái Thanh and Khánh Ly, the latter is known for singing songs composed by Trịnh Công Sơn, were/are labeled as “sang” singers while singers such as Thanh Tuyền and Chế Linh, the latter also a recognized pre-1975 composer were/are considered sến or bình dân (traditional folk) singers. Bolero music remains the most popular music genre in Vietnam. The style was influenced from Latin American music and was introduced in Vietnam in the 1950s, becoming a staple musical genre in South Vietnam, and much of its popularity is attributed to the emergence of pre-1975 music, which carried over into diasporic Vietnamese communities.

Some of the many famous and recognized composers of pre-1975 Vietnamese songs include: Trúc Phương, Trần Thiện Thanh (also a singer, director, and actor), Châu Kỳ, Duy Khánh (also a famous singer and music teacher), Hoàng Thi Thơ, Hồ Đình Phương, Nhật Ngân, Lê Dinh, Minh Kỳ, Anh Bằng, Lam Phương, Y Vân, Tâm Anh, and several composers who have been recognized for the contributions in the Vietnamese music industry pre-war and post-war.

There were several singers who emerged during the pre-1975 Vietnamese music era. Some of the many artists, who remain popular today, include: Thanh Thúy, Hương Lan, Phương Dung, Hoàng Oanh, Tuấn Vũ, Giang Tử among many.

=== From Pre-War to Diasporic: The Flourishing of Pre-1975 Vietnamese Music ===
The term diasporic Vietnamese music was strongly associated with pre-1975. Vietnamese music became diasporic, or sometimes known as Việt Kiều (often translates to overseas Vietnamese population) music has currently progressed in the United States since 1975. Valverde further notes that pre-1975 music is "influenced by sentiments of exile and ideologies of anti-communism" and additionally, diasporic Vietnamese music "has a special blend of nostalgia that appeals not only to members of diasporic communities but also to residents of Viet Nam." Vietnamese musicians and singers, most of whom were refugees and immigrants, were apprehensive on adapting and acculturating to their new homes or host countries. Vietnamese recording artists found that music served as bridge that connected refugees and "exiles to the homeland they thought they had lost." Overseas, or diasporic, singers today, those who were born during the war as children or born after 1975 such as Như Quỳnh, Trường Vũ, and Thế Sơn continue to record, sing, and perform various songs written and composed by several pre-1975 Vietnamese composers.

Vietnamese music began to flourish in the Vietnamese entertainment industry in the late 1970s and early 1980s, mobilizing a new industry for the Vietnamese community.

=== Thúy Nga Productions ===
One of the many popular Vietnamese music recording studios that continues to exist today is Thúy Nga Productions, founded by Tô Văn Lai, who was a university psychology, in 1963. Though, conflicting research indicates that Lai founded Thúy Nga in 1969.

Thúy Nga, which Tô named after his wife, is perhaps the largest and "most successful" recording company, creating a marketing "vision" called Paris by Night. Tô experienced "alienation" as a refugee, a feel shared by other Vietnamese refugees, and worked "to find a solution" that could be both distracting and entertaining." His goal was to establish Thúy Nga as a recording and production label, which "actuated Tô's stance as a cultural intellectual bringing traditional folk and contemporary Vietnamese music traditions into contact with popular American and French music." Paris by Night products, particularly the live recording shows sold in VHS, DVD, and Blu-rays formats and mass productions of CDs, evoked a sense of nostalgic pre-1975 sentiments and re-generating a "revival of cabaret music and entertainment from previously well-established Vietnamese performers." Pre-1975 never disappeared for Vietnamese refugees and immigrants. Kieu Linh Caroline Valverde adds:

In the first decade after the fall of Sai Gon, pre-1975 music was the staple of the Vietnamese American community. So popular was this genre of maudlin ballads from the wartime years that it has invoked some to call Vietnamese American popular music 'culture in a bubble.' Indeed, for over a decade after 1975, the same songs - be it western or Vietnamese that were popular in the nightclubs of Sai Gon during the Viet Nam war - were still being heard in coffee shops and nightclubs and sold in music stores.

The first video produced by Paris by Night was produced and recorded in Paris, costing about $19,000 in U.S. dollars. By the 1990s, Paris by Night products increased in production values, the mass production of their products, and popularity, allowing Thúy Nga to consistently to "release at least four videos a year, consisting of usually 24 performances from a range of international Vietnamese performers, a stage and technical crew of approximately three hundred people, often recording in front of packed audiences. Production costs per video have moved to US$500,000." Nguyễn Ngọc Ngạn, a Vietnamese-Canadian writer and essayist, and Nguyễn Cao Kỳ Duyên, the only daughter of Nguyễn Cao Kỳ, often appear as the hosts of Paris by Night live recording shows.

Tô eventually moved Thúy Nga's headquarters to Orange County, California, maintaining operations there since December 29, 1995. The decision to move headquarters was due to both "rising costs of production" and an increasing demand for live recordings to be produced in the U.S. and Canada.

=== Asia Entertainment ===
Asia Entertainment is another Vietnamese-oriented production and recording studio and company that is dedicated in offering high production values. Asia Entertainment was first established in the U.S. in the early 1980s and is owned by "shareholders and run by a manager." Cunningham and Nguyen note one of the main distinctions between Asia Entertainment and Thúy Nga:

Asia reaches out beyond the established community performers, focusing on promoting new talent in the U.S. and Canada. Through an annual 'star search' competition, Trúc Hồ, Asia's music director [and musician and producer], scouts for talent, offering contracts to perform live shows, video-taping and CD recordings for the company. It also encourages its audiences to take part in the 'quest of stardom' by testing talent using its karaoke recordings, and then sending in tapes of the performances.

And like many Vietnamese-based production companies, Asia maintains their revenue and profit from ticket sales of their live shows and "the domestic sale of CDs, videos and karaoke discs."

=== Music of the Exilic: An Industry of Nostalgia ===
The Vietnamese music industry flourished due to nostalgic memories of Vietnam, specifically the nostalgia "of a homeland before communism remains strong" for first-generation Vietnamese refugees because the songs, which were "nationalistic in nature, carried images of a glorious past and a hope of returning to the homeland." Songs about the homeland were/are now considered memories of the past for the exiled. Kieu Linh Caroline Valverde specifically references Phạm Duy's song, "1954 Cha Bo Que - 1975 Con Bo Nuoc" (translation: "The Exiles of a Father and His Son"]. This song was a reflection of how a father "had to leave the communist-controlled north in 1954 for the south; twenty years later his son had to feel Viet Nam altogether for the same reasons."
