= Như Quỳnh =

Vietnamese-American singer (born 1970)

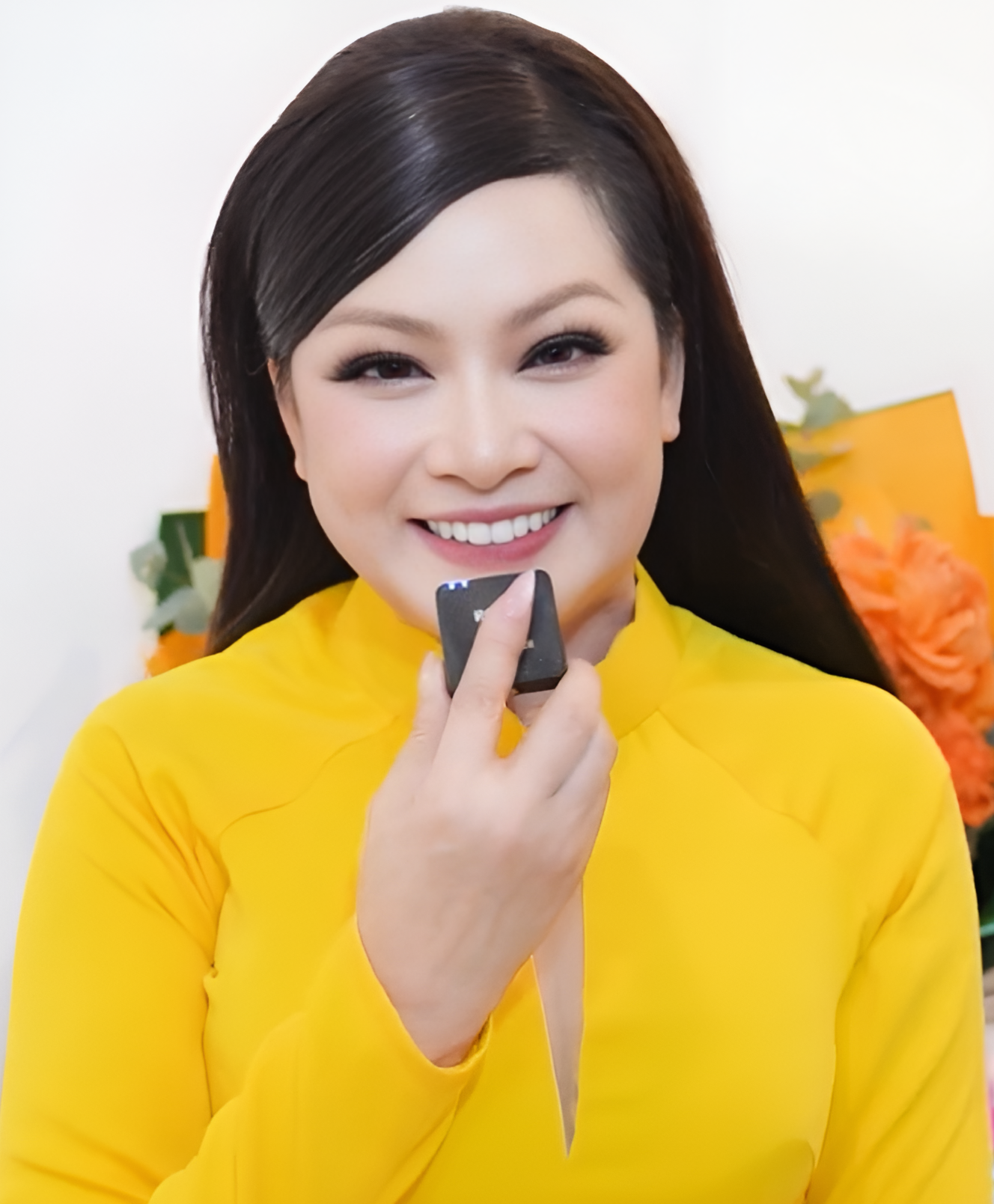
- Như Quỳnh in 2026

Background information
- Born: Lê Lâm Quỳnh Như; 9 September 1970 (age 56); Đông Hà, Quảng Trị Province, South Vietnam
- Genres: Vietnamese folk; bolero
- Occupations: Singer; songwriter
- Instrument: Vocals
- Years active: 1994–
- Labels: Asia; Thúy Nga; N-Q; Như Quỳnh

Lê Lâm Quỳnh Như (Vietnamese: [lē lə̄m kʷìŋ̟ ɲɨ̄] or [lē lə̄m wɨ̀n ɲɨ̄]; born 9 September 1970), known professionally as Như Quỳnh (Vietnamese: [ɲɨ̄ kʷìɲ] or [ɲɨ̄ wɨ̀n]), is a Vietnamese-American singer. Performing Vietnamese popular music in the diaspora, she is internationally known for her vocal style, as well as duets with musicians like Thế Sơn and Trường Vũ, with whom they have been noted to "link international Vietnamese music to Vietnam itself".

== Biography and career ==
=== 1970–1994: Early life ===
Lê Lâm Quỳnh Như was born in Đông Hà, Quảng Trị Province, South Vietnam, on 9 September 1970, to father Lê Văn Chánh, as the oldest child with two younger brothers, one named Tường Khuê. Her mother, an employee of the Bank of Commerce before the Fall of Saigon, was going to name her Đông Hà, after her birthplace but decided to name her Lâm Quỳnh Như instead. She was born sickly, and nearly died. For most of her childhood, her family lived through economic troubles after the Fall of Saigon. At a very young age, she performed in Ho Chi Minh City, first regularly on the stage of her old elementary school, and later in local children's television programs. Như Quỳnh studied music under professor Ba Thai of the Vietnamese National Music Institute and for a time, she taught music to young children in District 1, Ho Chi Minh City. In 2018, she stated that her mother was also interested in music, but her grandparents forbid her from attending art school, as they wanted children to focus on general education. During this time, she would occasionally watch American music videos and learn of American culture, which was a rare opportunity at the time.

Như Quỳnh's singing career formally began in 1991, where she performed in the Television Singing Contest in Ho Chi Minh City and won the special prize for her performance of "Mùa xuân trên thành phố Hồ Chí Minh". In April 1993, Như Quỳnh's family immigrated to the United States and settled in Philadelphia, Pennsylvania. Như Quỳnh went back to school in P.A, later starting work to support the family. In 1994, her parents met a fellow countryman with connections to Asia Entertainment, Inc.

=== 1994–1996: Chuyện hoa sim and Asia Entertainment ===
Her first musical performances were appearances in the Asia Entertainment variety shows Asia 6 and Asia 7, where she performed "Ngừơi tình mùa đông" and "Chuyện hoa sim", respectively. The former created an image of a singer with a sweet, clear and blissful voice and attracted listeners internationally, while the latter showed her capability of singing many genres and styles of music.

Under Asia Entertainment, she released three solo studio albums. Her first album, Chuyện hoa sim, was released on May 1, 1995, and was considered a best seller in the Vietnamese music industry (released outside of Vietnam). Her second album, Rừng lá thay chưa was released on August 5, 1995, including the songs "Rừng lá thay chưa" and "Như vạt nắng" performed at Asia. Her third studio album Chuyện tình hoa trắng, released on January 1, 1996, also fared well, containing the song of the same name. Như Quỳnh has also made guest appearances in other albums released under the label.

=== 1996–2007: Lawsuit and transfer to Thúy Nga ===
On June 30, 1996, Như Quỳnh's contract with Asia Entertainment reached a deadline, and a letter was sent the following month expressing her desire not to renew the contract, stating that she had performed and contributed to the required shows and albums. However, the company prevented her from performing outside of the contract through October 1996. Như Quỳnh sued the company for unpaid royalties and mental damage, claiming that two different contracts were signed. Asia also filed a lawsuit against Như Quỳnh, with the argument that she did not record the satisfactory number of records, and performed at shows outside of the contract. Asia Entertainment Inc. v. Quynh Nhu Le was later dismissed, with the explanation that Asia Entertainment did not meet the criteria to accuse the singer.

Như Quỳnh signed a contract with music label, Thúy Nga, where she debuted in the 38th event of the show Paris by Night in Toronto, Canada with "Hoa tím ngày xưa". She continued to perform on the show as a mainstay for many years, with songs like "Vào hạ", "Nỗi buồn Châu Pha", "Đêm chôn dầu vượt biển", "Chuyện tình buồn", "Nửa vầng trăng", "Chung mộng", and "Em đi xem hội trăng rằm", establishing her icon for Vietnamese women as well as earning the title of the "Queen of Folk".

In 1996, Như Quỳnh formed her own record label, N-Q Records, to allow her to release records in various genres and styles, in contrast to albums released under the main Thúy Nga label aimed to suit a broader audience. By 1999, she had merged the label with a newer record label, Như Quỳnh Entertainment.

=== 2007–present: Temporary move to Asia and return ===
In 2007, Như Quỳnh made her farewell appearance with Thúy Nga with "Mưa trên quê hương" in Paris by Night 89 in Seoul, South Korea. In August, Như Quỳnh returned to Asia Entertainment, making appearances in the shows Asia 56 and Asia 57. Later in 2008, she released the album Về lại đồi sim with her younger brother Tường Khuê (who had previously appeared in Hẹn một mùa xuân) and her adoptive brother Tường Nguyên, with whom she has made several collaborative albums on her own record labels. Her final performance with the label was in Asia 63, as well as an album release in 2009 titled Mưa buồn.

After two years with Asia, Như Quỳnh left and rejoined Thúy Nga, performing in Paris by Night 98 in Las Vegas. On September 1, 2010, Như Quỳnh released her tenth album under Thúy Nga titled Duyên phận. Như Quỳnh then released the album Lạ giường in spring 2011 in a joint collaboration with Thúy Nga and Như Quỳnh Entertainment.

== Musical style ==
Như Quỳnh has been described as a "traditional female vocalist". Along with her vocal performances when performing live, she also wears the traditional áo dài, which accentuates her image of a Vietnamese woman's "virginal innocence" in conjunction with her natural charm. Her performances have been described as having a sweet voice, with lyrics revolving around the homeland of Vietnam and impressive singing and dancing skills. Her vocal range at her debut was soprano; it has since deepened to mezzo-soprano by the release of the song "Duyên phận".

Như Quỳnh has stated that her voice fits well with the genres of rhumba, as well as music about the homeland and mothers. She is fond of the voices of singers Hương Lan, Khánh Hà, Ý Lan, Khánh Ly, Hoàng Oanh, Vũ Khanh, Duy Quang, Elvis Phương, and Thái Châu.

== Personal life ==
Around the time of her pregnancy, Như Quỳnh faced rumors about her, such as the possibility of an illegitimate child. Later in her career, she was featured in Vietnamese news, with much focus given to her appearance showing signs of aging. She is living in the United States with her family, where she believe that she found her true love, about 3 years after the loss of her mother.

== Discography ==
Key
| • | Indicates a cover of a foreign-language song |
| ‡ | Indicates a composition with existing copyright status |

=== Studio albums ===
| Title | Album details |
|---|---|
| Chuyện hoa sim ("Story of rose myrtle") | Released: May 1, 1995; Label: Asia Entertainment; Formats: CD, streaming, LP, digital download; Asia songs: "Người tình mùa đông" (1994) •; "Chuyện hoa sim" (1995, lyrics by Hữu Loan)‡; LK "Mưa" (with Mạnh Đình and Lâm Thúy Vân) (1995); "Mộng du" (1995, written by Phạm Duy) |
| Rừng lá thay chưa ("Have the leaves changed color") | Released: August 5, 1995; Label: Asia Entertainment; Formats: CD, streaming, digital download; Asia songs: "Rừng lá thay chưa" (1995); "Như vạt nắng" (with Gia Huy) (1996, written by Trúc Hồ)‡ |
| Liên khúc chiều mưa 3 ("Afternoon rain medleys 3") (with Mạnh Đình and Lâm Thúy Vân) | Released: October 1, 1995; Label: Asia Entertainment; Formats: CD |
| Chuyện tình hoa trắng ("White-flowered love story") | Released: January 1, 1996; Label: Asia Entertainment; Formats: CD, streaming, digital download; Asia songs: "Chuyện tình hoa trắng" (1996)‡; LK "Anh cứ hẹn"‡ & "Đến bên nhau"‡ (with Gia Huy) (1996); "Hãy quay về bên nhau" (1998)‡ |
| Một đời tìm nhau ("A lifetime searching for each other") | Released: August 1, 1996; Label: N-Q Records; Rereleased on January 14, 2020, by Thúy Nga; Format: CD, streaming, digital download; Paris by Night songs: "Hoa tím người xưa" (1996) |
| Bọt biển ("Seafoam") (with Thế Sơn) | Released: February 1, 1997; Label: Thúy Nga; Formats: CD, streaming, digital download; Paris by Night songs: "Tôi vẫn nhớ" (with Thế Sơn) (1996); "Bọt biển" (with Thế Sơn) (1997, written by Lam Phương) |
| Em vẫn hoài yêu anh ("I still love you") | Released: August 1, 1997; Label: N-Q Records; Rereleased on January 14, 2020, by Thúy Nga; Format: CD, streaming, digital download; Paris by Night songs: "Chờ người" (1997) |
| Nói với người tình ("Speak with your lover") (with Tường Nguyên) | Released January 2, 1998; Label: N-Q Records; Format: CD, digital download, streaming |
| Nỗi buồn Châu Pha ("Sorrow of Châu Pha") (with Mạnh Đình and Hoàng Lan) | Released: May 1, 1998; Label: Thúy Nga; Formats: CD, streaming, digital download; Paris by Night songs: "Nỗi buồn Châu Pha" (1997, written by Lê Dinh); LK "Tuổi học trò" (with Hoàng Lan and Mỹ Huyền) (1997); "Chung mộng" (1998, written by Lam Phương)‡ |
| Nếu đời không có anh ("If I live without you") | Released: August 1, 1998; Label: Như Quỳnh Entertainment, Thúy Nga; Rereleased on January 14, 2020, by Thúy Nga; Format: CD, streaming, digital download |
| Tim vỡ ("Heartbreak") (with Don Hồ) | Released: January 1, 1999; Label: Thúy Nga; Formats: CD, streaming, digital download; Paris by Night songs: "Chuyện lứa đôi" (with Don Hồ) (1999) |
| Điều chưa dám nói ("Things I dare not say") (with Tường Nguyên) | Released: January 1, 1999; Label: Như Quỳnh Entertainment, Thúy Nga; Format: CD, digital download, streaming |
| Tình yêu vỗ cánh ("Flying love") | Released: October 11, 1999; Label: Thúy Nga; Formats: CD, streaming, digital download; Paris by Night songs: "Tàn nỗi mong chờ" (1998) •; "Chuyến di về sáng" (1999); "Niềm vui không trọn vẹn" (1999, written by Lam Phương)‡; "Tình yêu vỗ cánh" (with Mạnh Đình) (1999); "Cho vừa lòng anh" (with Thế Sơn) (2000); "Thành phố sương mù" (2000)‡; "Câu lạc bộ làm quen" (2000) |
| Yêu tiếng hát ngày xưa ("Love the songs of the past") | Released: January 1, 2000; Label: Thúy Nga; Formats: CD, streaming, digital download; Paris by Night songs: "Tiếng hát chim Đa Đa" (1999); "Tiếng dân chài" (with Phi Nhung, Hoàng Lan, Nguyễn Hưng, and Thế Sơn) (1999) |
| Hẹn một mùa xuân ("Date with springtime") (with Phi Nhung, Tường Khuê, and Tường Nguyên) | Released: January 1, 2000; Label: Như Quỳnh Entertainment, Thúy Nga; Format: CD, digital download, streaming |
| Lý Bông Mai ("Melody of the yellow Mai") | Released: February 2, 2000; Label: Thúy Nga; Formats: CD, streaming, digital download; Paris by Night songs: "Cô tấm ngày nay" (with Bảo Hân, Loan Châu, and Châu Ngọc) (2000); "Hẹn hò đêm trăng" (with Mạnh Đình) (2000) • ‡; "Nhớ em Lý Bông Mai" (2000); "Em đi xem hội trăng rằm" (2000) |
| Người thương kẻ nhớ ("Missing and loving you") | Released: January 1, 2001; Label: Như Quỳnh Entertainment, Thúy Nga; Rereleased on January 14, 2020, by Thúy Nga; Format: CD, streaming, digital download |
| Xin đừng trách Đa Đa ("Please don't berate the Chinese francolin") (with Trường Vũ) | Released: August 25, 2001; Label: Thúy Nga; Formats: CD, streaming, digital download; Paris by Night songs: "Hẩm hiu một mình" (2000)‡; "Xin đừng trách Đa Đa" (2001)‡ |
| Không giờ rồi: Như Quỳnh đặc biệt song ca ("It's midnight: Như Quỳnh special duets") | Released: December 17, 2001; Label: Thúy Nga; Formats: CD, streaming; Paris by Night songs: "Lúa mùa duyên thắm" (with Thế Sơn) (2001); "Không giờ rồi" (with Trường Vũ) (2001)‡; "Thầm kín" (with Mạnh Đình) (2001); "Dù cho hoa tàn úa" (2001) • |
| Tình ơi... có hay! ("Oh... my love!") | Released: January 5, 2002; Label: Thúy Nga associated labels; Rereleased on January 14, 2020, by Thúy Nga; Formats: CD, streaming, digital download; Paris by Night songs: "Mười ngón tay tình yêu" (2002) • |
| Anh tiền tuyến, em hậu phương ("You as a soldier, me left behind") (with Trường Vũ) | Released: March 4, 2003; Label: Thúy Nga; Formats: CD, streaming, digital download; Paris by Night songs: "Anh tiền tuyến, em hậu phương" (with Trường Vũ) (2002) |
| Tơ tằm ("Silkworm") | Released: May 24, 2003; Label: Thúy Nga; Formats: CD, streaming, digital download; Paris by Night songs: "Tơ tằm" (2002)‡ |
| Khúc ca Đồng Tháp ("The song of Đồng Tháp") | Released: May 1, 2004; Label: Thúy Nga; Formats: CD, streaming, digital download; Paris by Night songs: "Nữa vầng trăng" (2003)‡; "Huế buồn" (2003, written by Lê Dinh); "Khúc ca Đồng Tháp" (2003) |
| Gọi đò ("Calling the boat") (with Tường Nguyên) | Released: November 2, 2006; Label: Như Quỳnh Entertainment, Thúy Nga; Format: CD, digital download, streaming |
| Khi con tim biết yêu ("When you are falling in love") (with Thiệu Kỳ Anh) | Released: February 8, 2007; Label: Thúy Nga; Formats: CD, DVD |
| Về lại đồi sim ("Return to the hill of rose myrtle") (with Tường Nguyên and Tường Khuê) | Released August 14, 2008; Label: Asia Entertainment; Format: CD, digital download, streaming |
| Mưa buồn ("Rain of sadness") | Released: April 16, 2009; Label: Asia Entertainment; Formats: CD, streaming; Asia songs: "Mưa buồn" (2007)‡; "Khóc mẹ dân oan" (2007); "Thăm mộ mẹ" (2008); "Những kiếp hoa xuân" (2008); "Trên đỉnh mùa đông" (with Quốc Khanh) (2009) |
| Duyên phận ("Yuanfen") | Released: September 1, 2010; Label: Thúy Nga; Formats: CD, streaming, digital download; Paris by Night songs: "Mơ ánh trăng về" (2010, lyrics by Như Quỳnh) •; "Duyên phận" (2010)‡; LK "Nước cuốn hoa trôi" & "Tình nàng La Lan" (2010) |
| Lạ giường ("Strange bed") | Released: March 10, 2011; Label: Như Quỳnh Entertainment, Thúy Nga; Rereleased on January 14, 2020, by Thúy Nga; Format: CD, streaming, digital download; A Dancing Dream songs: "Lạ giường" (2011)‡; "Vùng lá me bay" (2011) |
| Hương kỷ niệm ("Fragrant memory") (with Huỳnh Gia Tấn) | Released: May 24, 2012; Label: Như Quỳnh Entertainment, Thúy Nga; Format: CD, streaming |
| Người phụ tình tôi ("The one who betrayed my love") | Released: March 1, 2021; Label: Thúy Nga; Format: CD, streaming |

=== Live albums ===
These albums were released as part of the Thúy Nga Music Box series.

| Title | Album details |
|---|---|
| Nhớ người yêu ("Miss your lover") (with Trường Vũ) | Released: June 16, 2020; Label: Thúy Nga; Format: streaming, digital download; Music Box songs: "Nhớ người yêu" (with Trường Vũ) (Music Box 4, 2020); "Trang nhật ký" (Music Box 4, 2020); "Không giờ rồi" (with Trường Vũ) (Music Box 4, 2020); "Một mình thôi" (Music Box 4, 2020); "LK Sao không thấy anh về & Nén hương yêu" (with Trường Vũ) (Music Box 4, 2020, written by Duy Khánh) |
| Xin tình yêu ở lại ("Please let love stay") (with Tâm Đoan) | Released: December 31, 2020; Label: Thúy Nga; Format: streaming, digital download; Music Box songs: "Mùa đông thương nhớ" (with Tâm Đoan) (Music Box 25, 2020); "Trộm nhìn nhau" (Music Box 25, 2020); "Tấm ảnh ngày xưa" (Music Box 25, 2020); "Buồn làm chi em ơi" (with Tâm Đoan) (Music Box 25, 2020) |
| Duyên kiếp ("Predestined lives") (with Trường Vũ) | Released: April 10, 2021; Label: Thúy Nga; Format: streaming, digital download; Music Box songs: "Kể chuyện trong đêm" (with Trường Vũ) (Music Box 29, 2021); "Người phụ tình tôi" (with Trường Vũ) (Music Box 29, 2021)‡; "Người tình và quê hương" (Music Box 29, 2021); "Vùng lá me bay" (with Trường Vũ) (Music Box 29, 2021); "Sao trời lấp lánh" (Music Box 29, 2021) •; "Duyên kiếp" (with Trường Vũ) (Music Box 29, 2021, written by Lam Phương) |

=== Compilation albums ===
| Title | Album details |
|---|---|
| The Best of Như Quỳnh | Released: July 28, 2005; Label: Thúy Nga; Formats: CD, streaming, digital download; Paris by Night songs: "Chuyện tình người trinh nữ tên Thi" (1997, written by Hoàng Thi Thơ); "Đường xưa lối cũ" (1997, written by Hoàng Thi Thơ); "Nỗi buồn Châu Pha" (1997); "Nhớ người yêu" (with Trường Vũ) (2000); "Sắc hoa màu nhớ" (with Thế Sơn) (2001); "Làng tôi" (2001); "Yêu cái đèn cù" (2001); "Chồng xa" (2001); "Lời ru của mẹ" (2002)‡; "Hai kỷ niệm một chuyến đi" (2002); "Giấc mơ cánh cò" (with Phi Nhung) (2003)‡; "Huế buồn" (2003) |
| The Best of Như Quỳnh 2: Áo hoa ("Flower dress") | Released: May 24, 2007; Label: Thúy Nga; Formats: CD, streaming, digital download; Paris by Night songs: "Nữa vầng trăng" (2003)‡; "Hành trang giã từ" (with Trường Vũ) (2003); LK "Trương Chi Mỵ Nương"‡ & "Chuyện tình bên nhánh sông gầy"‡ (with Lâm Nhật Tiến) (2003); "Người ngoài phố" (2004); "Đố ai" (2004, written by Phạm Duy); "Mưa rừng" (2004); "Hoa bướm ngày xưa" (with Trần Thái Hoà) (2004); "Đêm chôn dầu vượt biển" (2005); LK "Con đường xưa em đi" & "Xin anh giữ trọn tình quê" (written by Duy Khánh) (with Trường Vũ) (2005); "Nối lại tình xưa" (2005); "Xuân mong chờ" (2006) •; "Còn thương rau đắng mọc sau hè" (2006); "Vọng cổ buồn" (2006); "Chờ anh bên đồi" (2006); "Áo hoa" (with Quang Lê) (2006); "Phố đêm" (with Trường Vũ) (2006) |
| The Best of Như Quỳnh: Trên đỉnh mùa đông ("On top of winter") | Released: October 26, 2012; Label: Asia Entertainment; Formats: CD, streaming; Asia songs: "Người tình mùa đông" (1994) •; "Chuyện hoa sim" (1995)‡; "Rừng lá thay chưa" (1995); "Chuyện tình hoa trắng" (1996)‡; "Mẹ tôi" (1996); "Mưa buồn" (2007)‡; "Khóc mẹ dân oan" (2007); "Tiếc thương" (with Lâm Nhật Tiến) (2008); "Thăm mộ mẹ" (2008); "Những kiếp hoa xuân" (2008); "Trên đỉnh mùa đông" (with Quốc Khanh) (2009) |
| Duyên phận ("Fate") | Released: January 25, 2019; Label: Thúy Nga; Formats: LP, streaming; Paris by Night songs: "Chồng xa" (2001); "Nữa vầng trăng" (2003)‡; "Khúc ca Đồng Tháp" (2003); "Người ngoài phố" (2004); "Còn thương rau đắng mọc sau hè" (2006); "Duyên phận" (2010)‡; "Trả lại thời gian" (2011); "Lênh đênh phận buồn" (2017)‡ |
| Vùng lá me bay ("Where tamarind leaves fly") | Released: January 25, 2019; Label: Thúy Nga; Formats: LP, streaming; Paris by Night songs: "Chờ người" (1997); "Thương về Miền Trung" (1999); "Làng tôi" (2001); "Tơ tằm" (2002)‡; "Huế buồn" (2003); "Mưa rừng" (2004); "Câu chuyện đầu năm" (2005); "Vùng lá me bay" (A Dancing Dream, 2011) |

=== Singles ===
| Title | Single details |
|---|---|
| "Vòng tay giữ trọn ân tình" ("The bracelet that protects our love") | Released: January 1, 1998; Label: N-Q Records; Formats: CD |
| "Buồn làm chi em ơi" ("What are you sad for, dear") | Released: August 22, 2020; Label: Thúy Nga; Formats: streaming, digital download |

== Videography ==
=== Video albums ===
| Title | Year | Label |
|---|---|---|
| The Best of Như Quỳnh 1 from Paris by Night | 2000 | Thúy Nga |
| The Best of Như Quỳnh & Trường Vũ: Không giờ rồi (with Trường Vũ) | 2005 | Thúy Nga |
| The Best of Như Quỳnh 2 from Paris by Night: Nữa vầng trăng | 2007 | Thúy Nga |
| The Best of Như Quỳnh 3: Hoa tím người xưa | 2010 | Thúy Nga |
| The Best of Như Quỳnh 4: Trả lại thời gian | 2012 | Thúy Nga |
| The Best of Như Quỳnh: Mưa buồn | 2012 | Asia |

== Filmography ==
=== Direct-to-videos ===
| Year | Title | Role | Notes | Ref. |
|---|---|---|---|---|
| 1994–1996, 1998, 2007–2009 | Asia | Herself | Series 6–12, 17, 56–63, Giải Sáng Tác 2008, Viet Model, Đêm Giáng Sinh | |
| 1996–2007, 2009–present | Paris by Night | Herself | Series 38–84, 88, 89, 98–115, 117, 119–present, Divas, Gloria 3 | |
| 2006 | Nửa Đời Hương Phấn | The/Hương | Cải lương genre film | |
| 2011 | A Dancing Dream | Herself | Season 1 | |

=== Television ===
| Year | Title | Role | Network | Notes | Ref. |
|---|---|---|---|---|---|
| 2016 | Tonight with Viet Thao | Herself | Thúy Nga | Episode 13 | |
