= Lang Van =

Làng Văn
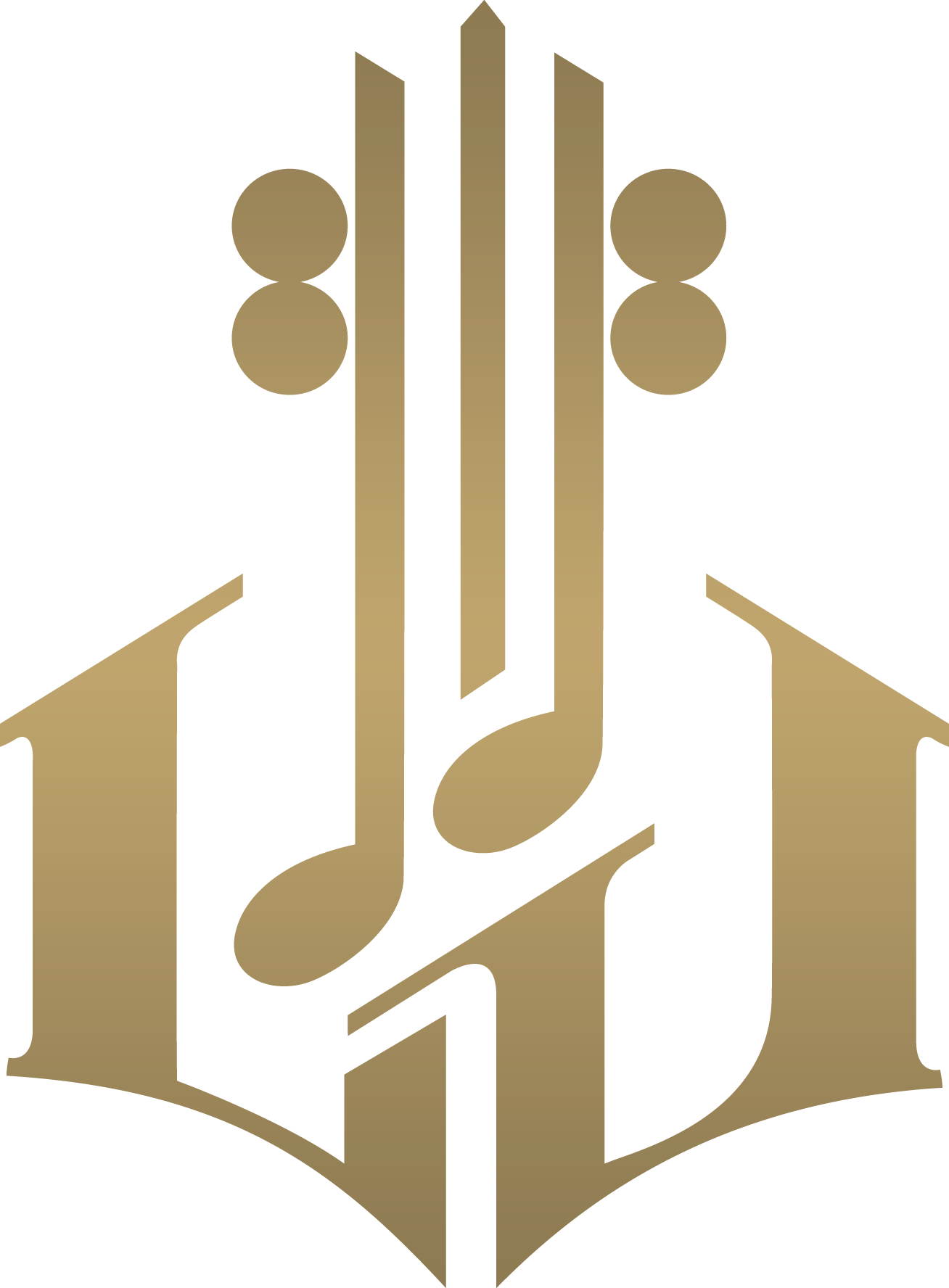
- Type: Private
- Industry: Music; Multimedia
- Founded: Founded: Orange County, CA, United States
- Founder: Chuc Le - Bich Lan Nguyen
- Headquarters: Westminster, California, United States; Ho Chi Minh City (Saigon), Vietnam
- Area served: people served: Overseas Vietnamese, Vietnamese people
- Key people: Chairman/CEO: Bich Lan Nguyen; COO: Mimi Nguyen
- Products: Duyên Dáng Việt Nam; CD & DVD; Digital Copy
- Website: Lang Van, Inc.

Lang Van (Vietnamese: Làng Văn) is a Vietnamese production company based in Westminster, CA and Ho Chi Minh City, Vietnam.

== History ==
Làng Văn (translated as ‘Village of Poetry’ in English) was founded in 1982. It was one of the first Vietnamese production companies to be established in the United States after Thanh Lan Productions, and the very first to open in Westminster, CA. It is one of the oldest music companies in Little Saigon, Orange County.

As a production company, it has released and owns the rights to more than 1,000 original titles in audio and video formats such as Thế Giới Nghệ Thuật (The World of Arts) and Lunar New Year Tết Festival programs in both the United States and Vietnam. They have signed exclusive contracts to produce and publish recordings with iconic Vietnamese artists such as Chế Linh, Tuấn Vũ, Elvis Phương, Duy Khánh, and Hương Lan.

Furthermore, the company also operates and produces in Vietnam. It has produced the live show/concert series Duyên Dáng Việt Nam (Charming Vietnam) for five consecutive years (15, 16, 17, 18 and 19) as well as various works of cải lương (known as Vietnamese Opera), comedy, karaoke, and educational and children's programming in Vietnam. A popular children's program it produces is Bé Xuân Mai.

== Controversy ==
According to Tech in Asia, Lang Van filed the biggest lawsuit against a Vietnamese tech company in the US, as of 2014, for copyright infringements by VNG, as well as its venture capitalist firm IDG Ventures Vietnam.

== Operations ==
From 2000 to 2005, it expanded their operations into acquisitions and distribution and acquired multiple Vietnamese music companies such as New Castle, Nguoi Dep Binh Duong, Truong Son Duy Khanh, Thuy Anh, Doremi and others. During this time period to the present, Làng Văn affiliated with various Vietnam-based productions to distribute their titles internationally. Làng Văn has 6 retail stores domestically and abroad including, Paris, France, the historic Asian Garden Mall (Phước Lộc Thọ) now closed in Westminster, California and Ho Chi Minh City, Vietnam. Lang Van is the only US-based Vietnamese production company to operate both in the United States and Vietnam.

It has retail stores in Westminster (Little Saigon) and San Jose, CA, Paris, France, Washington D.C., Houston, TX, and Atlanta, GA.

== Notable artists ==
Many of the artists that Làng Văn has signed exclusive contracts with also appear regularly in the popular Paris By Night series.

- Chế Linh
- Tuấn Vũ
- Elvis Phương
- Duy Khánh
- Hương Lan
- Lynda Trang Đài
- Phi Nhung
- Thanh Lan
- Khánh Hà
- Ngọc Lan

It has also produced the recordings of famed Vietnamese artist Khánh Ly and has re-licensed many songs by legendary Vietnamese songwriters Phạm Duy and Trịnh Công Sơn. Its music was also featured in the 1993 Vietnamese-language film The Scent of Green Papaya, which was shortlisted for Academy Award for Best Foreign Language Film.

=== Phong Le ===
In 2009, Làng Văn distributed YouTube artist Phong Le's debut album Lấy Tiền Cho Gái.

== See also ==
- Paris By Night
