= Tuan Vu =

Tuan Vu may refer to:

- Tom Vu, Vietnamese American poker player.
- Tuấn Vũ, Vietnamese singer.
- Tuấn Vũ, Vietnamese architect based in Portland, Oregon, USA.
- Tuần vũ (巡撫), the title of Grand coordinator and provincial governor in the Nguyễn dynasty used between 1831 and 1945.
