= Phi Nhung =

Vietnamese-born American singer (1970-2021)

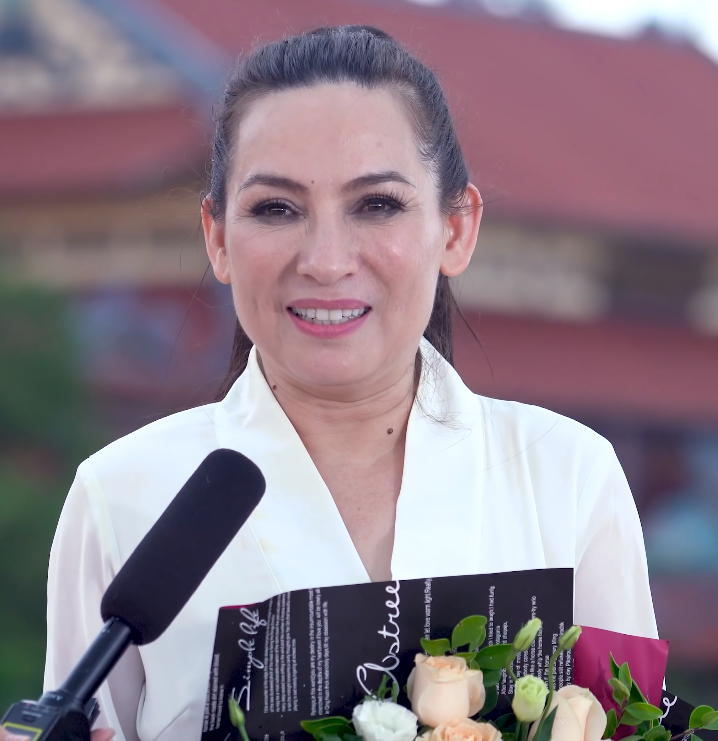
- Nhung in 2020

Background information
- Born: Phạm Phi Nhung; 10 April 1970; Pleiku, Gia Lai Province, South Vietnam
- Died: 28 September 2021 (aged 51) Ho Chi Minh City, Vietnam
- Genres: Vọng cổ; Cải lương
- Occupations: Singer; Actress; Humanitarian
- Years active: 1993–2021
- Label: Thúy Nga

Phạm Phi Nhung (10 April 1970 – 28 September 2021) was a Vietnamese-American singer, actress and humanitarian.

She specialised in Dan Ca and Tru Tinh music. She sang for Paris By Night and Vân Sơn and also acted in their plays and Tinh production. She also recorded music for Lang Van. She performed several duets with singer Mạnh Quỳnh during her career. She spent most of her time in Vietnam helping the poor and orphans.

== Early life ==
Phạm Phi Nhung was born on 10 April 1970 in Pleiku, Vietnam to a Vietnamese mother and an American serviceman father. Due to her poor economic upbringing, Phi Nhung only received an education up to the 6th grade. As a child, Phi Nhung was unaware that her father was an American soldier who was stationed in Pleiku during the Vietnam War.

From a young age, Phi Nhung listened to Vietnamese folk music which later influenced her own music.

In 1982, Phi Nhung's mother died. Now orphaned at age 12, Phạm went to live with her grandparents. She became a financial caregiver to her five siblings.

== Career ==
In October 1989, Phi Nhung emigrated to the United States as part of its immigration policy towards Amerasian war children. She moved to Tampa, Florida where she met Trizzie Phuong Trinh, a Vietnamese-American singer at a charity concert for a temple. Recognizing her talent, Trizzie advised Phi Nhung to go to California to pursue her dreams. Because she came late to this country, she was very hesitant. In 1993, she moved to Orange County, California.

Her first appearance on stage proved to not be spectacular, causing her to want to abandon her dreams of becoming a singer. Fortunately, thanks to the encouragement of female singer Huong Lan, Phi Nhung has decided to pursue her career as far as possible. Phi Nhung began to gain popularity after her duet "Que River 1" with famous singer Thai Châu in Hollywood Night 15, after which she made a debut CD with voices of two great singers and American Huyen Vu Tuan. In a recent interview Phi Nhung had confided that to make it big in the music industry, she risked a lot of sweat and tears to pursue the profession, as well as having to self-selling CD's, and singing at music bars.

Phi Nhung returned to Vietnam in 2005 to perform, where her popularity began to rise. Besides singing, she has had film roles, acted as drama artist, comedian and emcee. When in the United States, she performed with CarbonWorks, a musical group founded by Neal Barnard, who also founded Physicians Committee for Responsible Medicine.

In 2014, Phi Nhung accepted an invitation to become judge of a reality TV show searching for musical talent and lyrical Solo Bolero 2014. With the comment centered, detailed and reasonable music reviews, Phi Nhung was loved and admired by both contestants and the audience. In 2015, Phi Nhung accepted the invitation to become guest judge of the Southern Star program (Jury Final Exam 5 night). Subsequently she also appeared in the role of judge of the Bolero 2 Solo 2015 season.

In early 2016, alongside Hoai Linh, Phi Nhung participated as a judge for the Southern Stars 2016 gameshow.

In early 2021, she participated in the game show of Ky Uc Vui Ve.

== Personal life and death ==
Phi Nhung was Buddhist. She was a noted philanthropist, returning to Vietnam to participate in orphanage projects, starting a fund that cared for orphans at the Phap Lac Pagoda in Binh Phuoc Province. She adopted 19 children.

On 26 August 2021, Phi Nhung was hospitalized at Cho Ray Hospital in Ho Chi Minh City after contracting COVID-19. Her health deteriorated a month later, and she died on 28 September 2021, at the age of 51. Her remains were cremated and sent back to the United States days prior to her funeral. Her funeral was held on 12 October 2021, with members of Paris by Night attending. She was interred in Chùa Huệ Quang in Santa Ana, California later that day.

== Discography ==
=== Studio albums ===
- Những đốm mắt hỏa châu (First CD)
- Bông điên điển CD 1,2
- Bọt mưa
- 20 Năm Tình Đẹp Mùa Chôm Chôm (Biển 18)
- Ai khổ vì ai
- Thà trắng thà đen
- Làm dâu xứ lạ(Biển 47)
- Giọt lệ tình
- Bên cầu nhớ mong
- Đếm giọt sầu rơi
- Mùa thu lá bay
- "Nỗi buồn hoa phượng 1,2 (CD audio, MV)
- Những tình khúc dang dở
- Năm cụm núi quê hương
- "Mong em còn ngày mai"
- "Quê hương 3 miền"
- "Viết từ KBC (Album)"
- "Nếu hai đứa mình"
- "Đời con gái"
- "Mong chờ"
- "Thân phận"
- Chuyến xe miền tây
- Sầu cố đô
- Tình khúc quê hương
- Tình ca Thanh Sơn 1,2
- Bông cỏ may
- Chuyến đò vỹ tuyến
- Nàng yêu hoa tím
- Một người đi
- Rừng lá thấp
- Gõ cửa
- Thầm kín
- Sương lạnh chiều đông
- Bến cũ đò xưa (Thúy Nga)
- Tơ duyên (Thúy Nga)
- Phải lòng con gái Bến Tre
- Ngựa ô thương nhớ (Thúy Nga)
- "Thương em lý miệt vườn (Thúy Nga)"
- "Trống vắng"
- Ninh Kiều em gái Cần Thơ
- Khổ Tâm
- Ba tháng tạ từ
- Sau những lần gối mỏi
- Mưa dĩ vãng
- Chuyến xe lam chiều
- Nhật ký đời tôi
- Hành trang giã từ
- Căn nhà ngoại ô

- Dấu chân kỷ niệm
- Gái nhà nghèo
- Đò tình lỡ chuyến
- Tình cờ
- Giây phút chạnh lòng
- Hận Tha La
- Kỷ niệm chúng mình
- Trở lại Bạc Liêu
- Hai mùa mưa
- Phố đêm
- Người đẹp bên trăng
- Hoa sứ nhà nàng 2
- Chuyện đêm mưa
- Mưa qua phố vắng
- Điệu buồn Phương Nam
- Có lẽ
- Chuyến đò Hậu Giang
- Màu hoa bí
- Để tóc nàng ngủ yên
- Lý con sáo Bạc Liêu
- Cánh hoa rừng
- Một chuyến về quê
- Đò dọc
- Tình ngăn đôi bờ
- Chuyện tình ong bướm
- Chờ người
- Anh hãy về đi
- Về quê em CD 1,2
- Kể chuyện trong đêm
- Lời cuối cho tình yêu
- Chiều qua phà hậu giang
- Nét buồn thời chiến (1997)
- Dạ cổ hoài lang
- Đôi ngã chia ly
- Phận bạc
- Hương tóc nàng dâu
- Ngày tết quê em
- Qua cơn mê
- The best of Phi Nhung CD 1,2
- Hành trình trên đất phù sa
- Hai ơi, đừng qua sông (2021, posthumuously)

- Câu chuyện đầu năm
- Chung một dòng sông
- Chiếc vòng cầu hôn
- Phản bội
- Năm 17 tuổi (Tuổi 17)
- Trách ai vô tình
- Độc huyền
- Áo xanh (Tình)
- Nhớ mẹ lý mồ côi
- Tiễn biệt
- Chỉ còn vần thơ
- Sau ngày hành quân
- Hoa thương nhớ ai
- Mùa sầu riêng
- Mưa trên phố Huế
- Tình đẹp mùa chôm chôm
- Chuyến xe lam chiều
- Một chuyến xe hoa
- Xuân của mẹ
- Còn thương góc bếp chai hè
- Thương lắm Cà Mau
- Con cò trắng (Tình)
- Sông quê tình nhỏ
- Thư cho mẹ
- Xa rồi hình bóng xưa
- Tình phai
- Lần đầu nói dối
- Cho vừa lòng anh
- Lá sầu riêng (Tình)
- Thuyền giấy chiều mưa
- Gợi nhớ quê hương
- Nối lại tình xưa
- Còn gì
- Hình bóng quê nhà
- Thuyền xa bến đỗ
- Còn mãi lời ru
- Chị đi tìm em
- Than thở lục bình (sau 2005)
- Thao thức vì em (2007)- Liveshow Một thoáng quê hương
- Chắc gì (2009)
- Bao giờ ta gặp lại ta (2012)
- Thương lắm mình ơi (2014)
- Mùa xuân hạnh phúc (2015)
- ...

=== Collaborative albums ===
==== With Mạnh Quỳnh ====
- Tân cổ giao duyên 1
- Tân cổ giao duyên 2
- Tân cổ giao duyên 3
- Viết thư tình
- Căn nhà màu tím
- Đam mê
- Nếu chúng mình cách trở
- Cơn mê tình ái
- Đoạn cuối tình yêu
- Màu hoa tím
- Đón xuân này nhớ xuân xưa
- Dòng sông hò hẹn
- Tình anh lính chiến
- Tình đời
- Mực tím mồng tơi

- Đừng nói xa nhau
- Tình nghèo
- Nhớ em câu hát đò đưa
- Dù anh nghèo
- Thành phố buồn
- Chuyện ba mùa mưa

==== With other artists ====
- Những đốm mắt hỏa châu (with Tuấn Vũ and Mỹ Huyền)
- Mai lỡ mình xa nhau (with Tuấn Vũ)
- Sông quê tình nhớ (with Thái Châu)
- Chân dung kỷ niệm (with Thái Châu)
- Rồi ngày mai xa nhau (with Thái Châu)
- Những ngày xưa thân ái (with Thái Châu)
- Nói với người tình (with Nguyên Vũ)
- Giờ Tý canh ba (with Nguyên Vũ)
- Ru lại câu hò (with Tường Nguyên)
- Rau đắng tình xa (with Tường Nguyên)
- Ngẫu hứng lý qua cầu (with Quang Lê)
- Đêm buồn tỉnh lẻ (with Chế Linh)
- Chúng mình cách trở (with Chế Linh)
- Ai giàu ba họ ai khó ba đời (with Dương Ngọc Thái)
- Rồi 20 năm sau (with Giao Linh)
- Nỗi buồn hoa phượng (with Thanh Tuyền)
- Cũng bởi do tiền (with Dương Ngọc Thái)

- Tình đẹp Hậu Giang (with Duy Trường)
- Ngày còn em bên tôi (with Trường Vũ)
- Lỡ chuyến đò tình (with Trường Vũ)
- Màu hoa bí (with Trường Vũ)
- Sầu tím thiệp hồng (with Mạnh Đình)
- Tiếng cuốc gọi đêm (with Đan Trường)
- Giữa dòng mưu sinh (with Đan Trường)
- Tình ca quê hương (with Hương Lan)
- Tình khúc Quê Hương (with Dương Hồng Loan)
- Tân cổ Tâm sự với anh (with Kim Tử Long)
- Tâm hồn xao động (with Kelvin Khoa)

==== As part of Thúy Nga ====
- Hai đứa nghèo
- Giấc mơ cánh cò

== Filmography ==
Year	Film	Role	Other notes
2010	Lâu Đài Tình Ái (The Love Castle)	The housemaid	Supporting Role
2010	Mùa Hoa Dại (Blooming Season of Wildflowers)	Thơm (Thom)	Main Role
