= Burmese people in China =

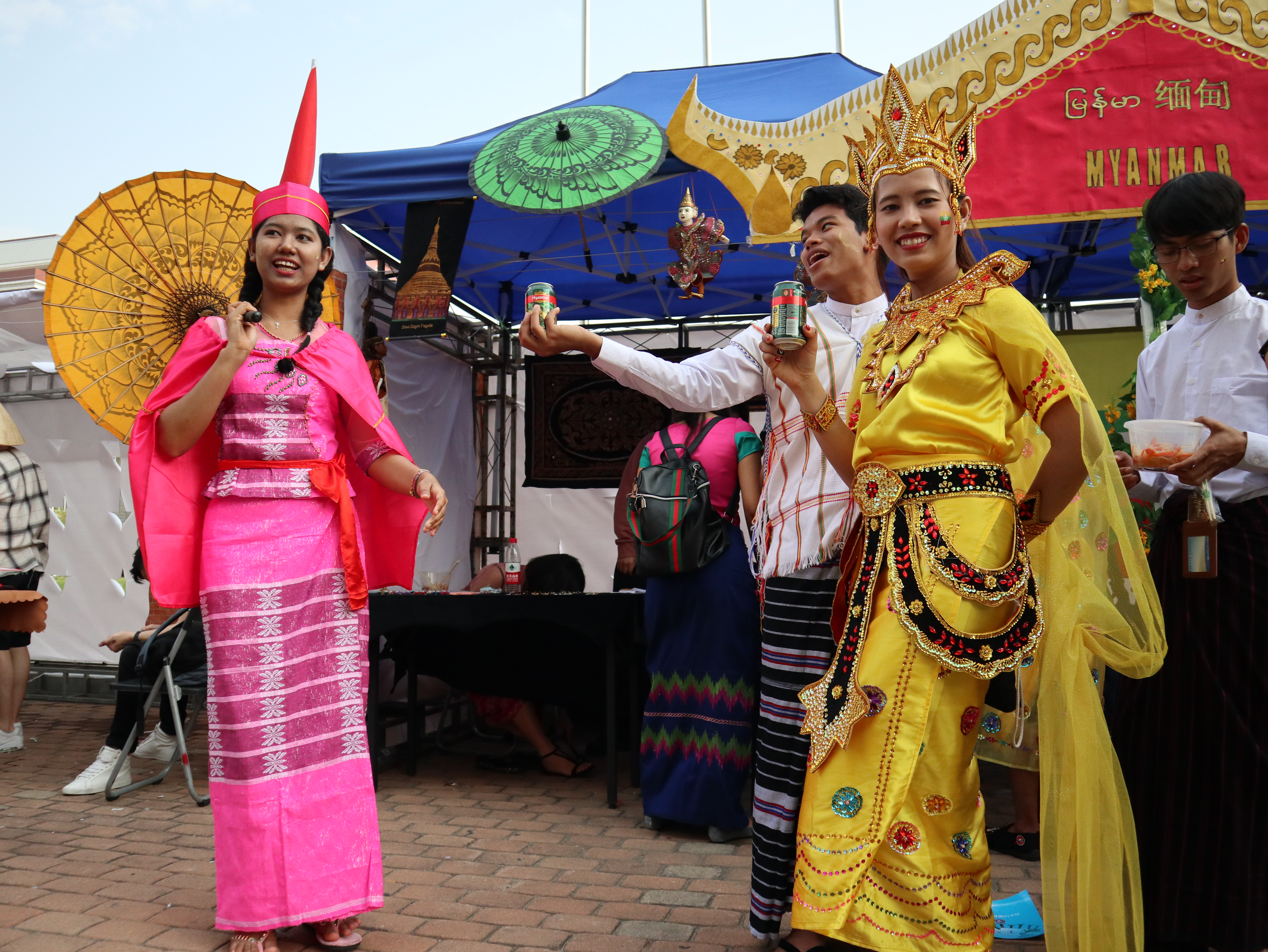
- Burmese students at the University of International Business and Economics (Beijing) in April 2018

Total population
- 351,248 (2020, census)

Regions with significant populations
- Yunnan

Languages
- Burmese language

Religion
- Buddhism, Atheism

Related ethnic groups
- Wa people; Jingpo people; Akha people; Dai people; Lahu people; Hani people; Lisu people

Burmese people in China mainly live in Yunnan, which borders Myanmar (Burma). According to the 2020 Chinese census, a total of 351,000 Burmese nationals live in China. As of 2020, Burmese nationals were the largest group of expatriates in China, whereas the second largest group was the Vietnamese, numbering seventy-nine thousand.

In addition of legal residents, many Burmese people were smuggled to China and found jobs in sweatshops often located in East China. Many Burmese nationals live or work in Yunnan, often in border cities like Ruili. During intensified clashes between armed groups along the China–Myanmar border, many Myanmar refugees enter China and reside in Chinese border camps. During the COVID-19 pandemic, the border was closed, negatively impacting border city economies and creating humanitarian concerns for Burmese refugees.

== Borderlands ==
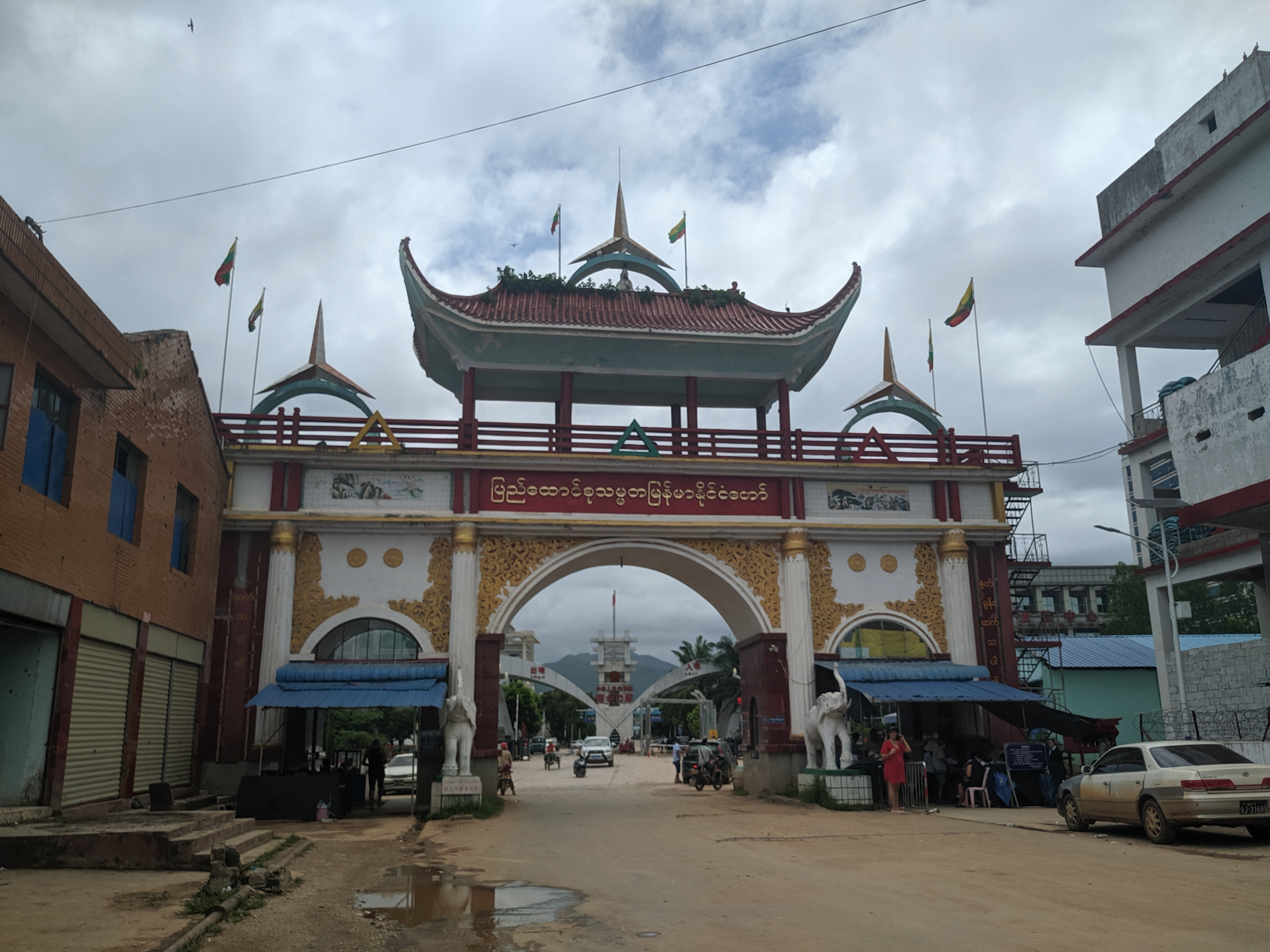
Yanlonkyine border gate with China in Kokang, Myanmar

The boundary area is inhabited by non-Han and non-Burmese peoples, and has been traditionally kept as a buffer region between the various Chinese and Burmese empires. The modern border of China and Myanmar also divides several ethnic minorities found in both countries. The ethnic makeup along the China-Myanmar border is further complicated as individuals can identify with multiple ethnic identities depending on the specificity and socioeconomic context. Until the 1950s KMT battles, many minorities from Myanmar understood Chinese-ness not as an ethnicity, but as a cultural feature.

The China-Myanmar border is porous, as a militarized, strict border control was controversial prior to 2020. Burmese migrant workers are included within the economy of Chinese border cities in Yunnan Province through a "compromise-oriented border control." China implemented flexible migration for Burmese workers while implementing surveillance, policing and other enforcement tactics in border cities instead of only at the border. Burmese migrants in Chinese border cities live and work within China but endure economic exploitation, spatial confinement and social discrimination. In 2015, China Daily reported that approximately 50 thousand Burmese people were working in Ruili, Yunnan. They mostly worked in industries of jewellery and rosewood as well as tourism in the service sector. In recent years, several towns along the border, such as Mong La, Ruili and Muse, have become centres of gambling, prostitution and drug smuggling. Before the outbreak of COVID-19, 50,000 Burmese nationals crossed the border every day, including those working in Chinese border cities. During the pandemic, Ruili's population declined by 40,000 with many businesses being forced to close as China's Zero-COVID policy cut off all trade and migration with Myanmar until the partial reopening of the border checkpoint in January 2023.

In 2022, around a thousand Myanmar migrant workers were being held in Chinese detention centers. The vast majority of the detainees were undocumented illegal border crossers held in Yunnan after overstaying their six-day tourist visas. A hundred other Myanmar nationals were held in Guangdong Province, some arrested during factory raids by Chinese police.

=== Human trafficking ===
Yunnan has also become a "hot spot" for human trafficking since 2008 with instances of transnational marriage, mail-order brides and marriage migration between Myanmar and China have become more prevalent in Yunnan. There have been reports of over 7000 Burmese women and girls being sold for sexual slavery in China, where they are sold as "brides". Women were also reported to have been sold multiple times for the purpose of forced childbirth.

== Refugees ==
Yunnan province sheltered tens of thousands of refugees during periods of intensified clashes between Myanmar's military and ethnic armed organisations throughout the 2010s. Between 7,000 and 10,000 Kachin refugees entered camps in Yunnan fleeing fighting in 2011. Soon after the initial displacement, refugees were potentially denied entry or forcibly returned to IDP camps in Myanmar. China denied accusations of forcing refugees back, stating that those sent back were not refugees. Following the 2015 Kokang offensive in Myanmar, many Burmese nationals fled across the border to China. According to the United Nations, the conflict drove 70,000 people across the border into China with 27,000 remaining in China until 2016. Renewed clashes in Kokang in 2017 sent at least 20,000 people to enter border camps set up in China. The refugees received humanitarian assistance from the Chinese government.

In 2021, in the wake of the intensifying violence after the 2021 Myanmar coup d'état, China scrambled to secure its borders and limit refugees over fears of COVID-19. Seven thousand border guards were deployed to erect barbed wire fences near major border crossings. While China no longer allows Myanmar refugees or asylum seekers, many of Myanmar's internally displaced people (IDPs) conduct cross-border trade as border residents. The Chinese government continues to use a localized model of border control to prevent a large influx of refugees by providing cross-border livelihoods for displaced Burmese nationals on the border.

== Gallery ==
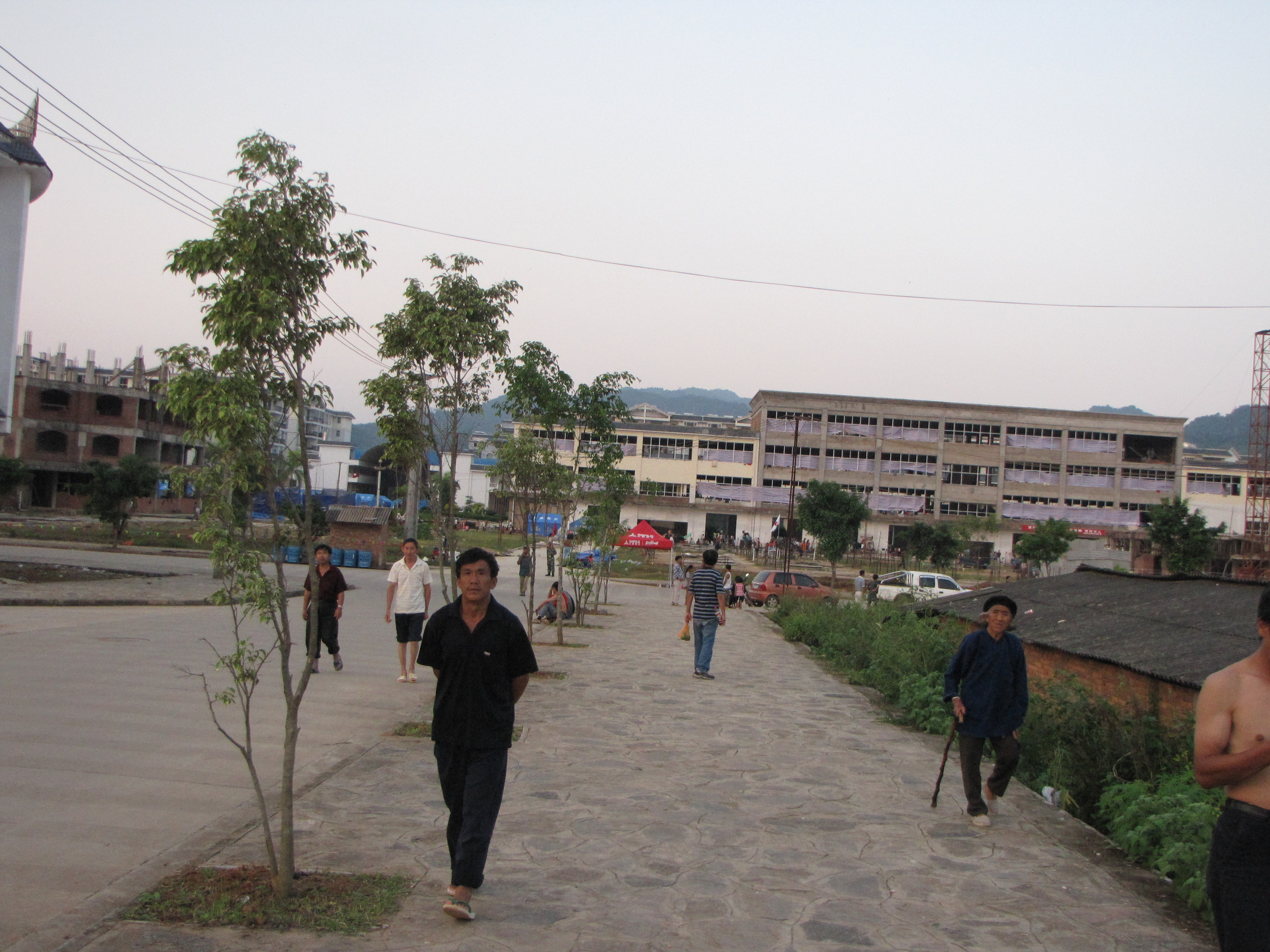
Burmese refugees in Nansan, Yunnan in 2009

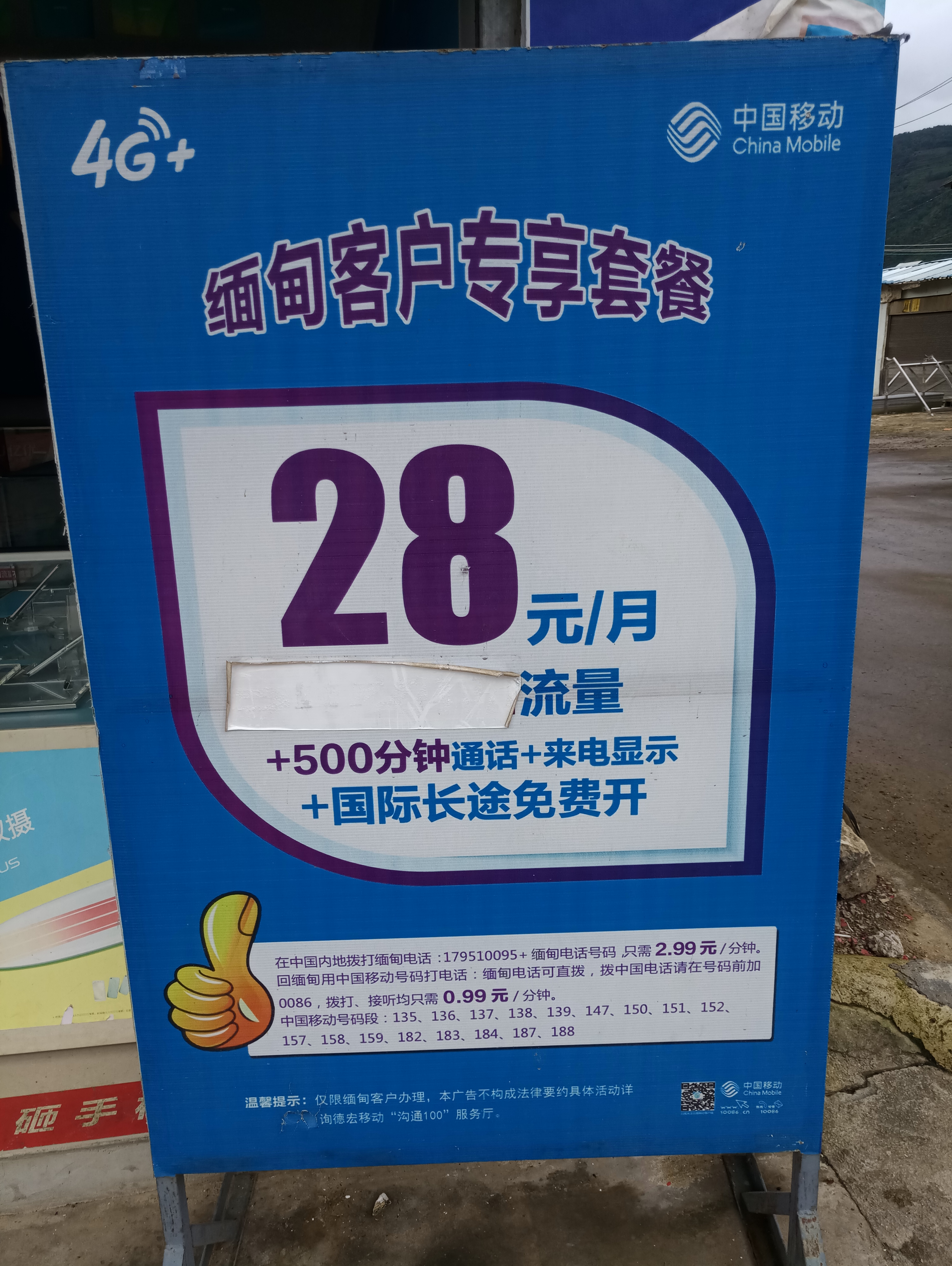
Poster in Mangshi, Yunnan, for phone plans offered by China Mobile only to Burmese customers
