= Tonight with Viet Thao =

Vietnamese late-night talk show

Tonight with Viet Thao is a Vietnamese late-night talk show created in early 2016, recorded in Orange County, CA, and is part of Thuy Nga Productions. It airs on the S-Channel, headquartered in Little Saigon, primarily and is currently in its first season. The language used is mostly Vietnamese, with minimal English. It is similar to current late-night talk shows, having a band and stand-up comedy every episode. It is mainly fixed on Vietnamese culture, as the show is in a Vietnamese-American community.

== Airing times ==
While many late-night talk shows air at near midnight, Tonight with Viet Thao has new episodes every Tuesday, having reruns on other days, and airs at the evening rather than late at night.

The times for the show are currently unknown, but are most likely shot from the late afternoon to the evenings.
