= Vũ Khanh =

Vietnamese singer (born 1954)

- Born: Vũ Công Khanh; April 1, 1954 (age 72); Hanoi, Vietnam
- Genres: Nhạc trẻ, Nhạc hải ngoại
- Occupation: Singer
- Years active: 1978–present
- Labels: Asia Thúy Nga Mây

Vũ Khanh or Vũ Công Khanh (born April 1, 1954, in Hanoi) is a Vietnamese singer.

== Biography ==
Vũ Khanh was born in a family of 11 children – and was the only one to follow a profession in singing. He graduated from the last class of the Saigon National School of Music and Drama. Despite his passion for music, his family could only afford him to study drama due to poverty.

For many years, Vũ Khanh performed in cafes, clubs, and restaurants – before he was able to sing in the professional Ritz tea room (1978). He started to come into people's attention after performing the song "Cô hàng nước" at a music festival in San Diego, US, in 1978.

Vũ Khanh's best co-star is Ý Lan, the daughter of singer Thái Thanh.

=== Reception ===
Composer Từ Công Phụng rated him as one of the best male oversea vocalists: "In terms male singers overseas, I currently recognize two talented and attractive vocalists, Tuấn Ngọc and Vũ Khanh." Many people compare Vũ Khanh with the male singer Sĩ Phú, due to similarities in their voice and performing style. He is also known for his performance of songs composed by famous musicians such as Trầm Tử Thiêng, Phạm Duy, Vũ Thành An, Từ Công Phụng, Song Ngọc, etc.
