= Phuong Dung =

South Vietnamese country music singer

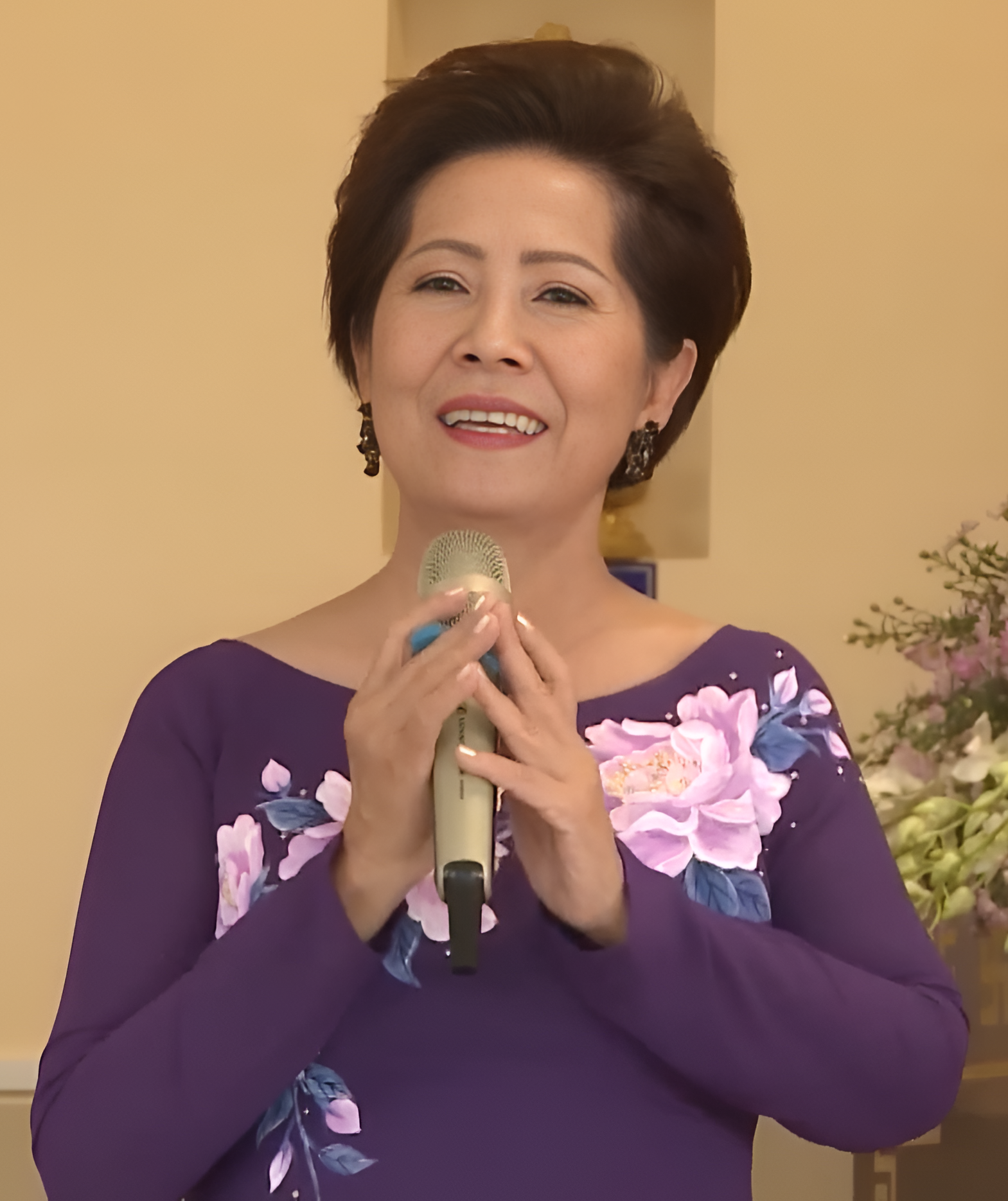
Phương Dung in 2019

Phương Dung (also known as Phan Phương Dung, born in 1946) is a Vietnamese music singer from 1960.

Phương Dung was born in Gò Công Province. She moved to Saigon when she finished primary school and attended secondary school from 1958 to 1959.

In May 2014, Phuong Dung joined with Giao Linh to perform concerts, Sol Golden, as an anniversary of her music career. Around the end of 2014, Phuong Dung was invited as judge for the music competition Solo cùng Bolero and continued on the talent show into 2016.
