= Tuấn Vũ =

Vietnamese singer (born 1959)

- Born: Nguyễn Văn Tài; 16 December 1959 (age 66)
- Origin: Đức Linh, Binh Thuận, South Vietnam
- Genres: Nhạc vàng, Nhạc hải ngoại, Tình khúc 1954–1975, Nhạc quê hương
- Occupation: singer
- Labels: Asia Thúy Nga Mây

Nguyễn Văn Tài (born 16 December 1959), stage name Tuấn Vũ, is a Vietnamese singer.

== Biography ==
Tuấn Vũ was born in Bình Thuận Province, Vietnam.

He migrated to the US in 1979 and settled in San Francisco, California. He then followed a profession in singing and became a well-known name in the yellow music genre. To date, he has recorded over 1,400 songs of various genres.

Poet Nguyên Sa gave Tuấn Vũ the title "Phượng Hoàng" ("Phoenix" in Vietnamese), which - as the singer explained - might be a reference to his father's name (Phượng) and the name of one of his adopted child (Hoàng).

Tuấn Vũ returned to Vietnam for the first time in 2001.

During his return to Vietnam in July 2010, Tuấn Vũ performed for 6 nights at Hanoi Opera House, Daewoo Hotel, as well as in many other northern provinces.

In November 2018, Tuấn Vũ returned to Vietnam again to hold a live show named "Mười năm tái ngộ" (Ten years of reunion), which took place at the Vietnam National Convention Center on December 9.

== See also ==
- Duy Khánh
- Chế Linh
