= Hoàng Oanh =

Vietnamese singer

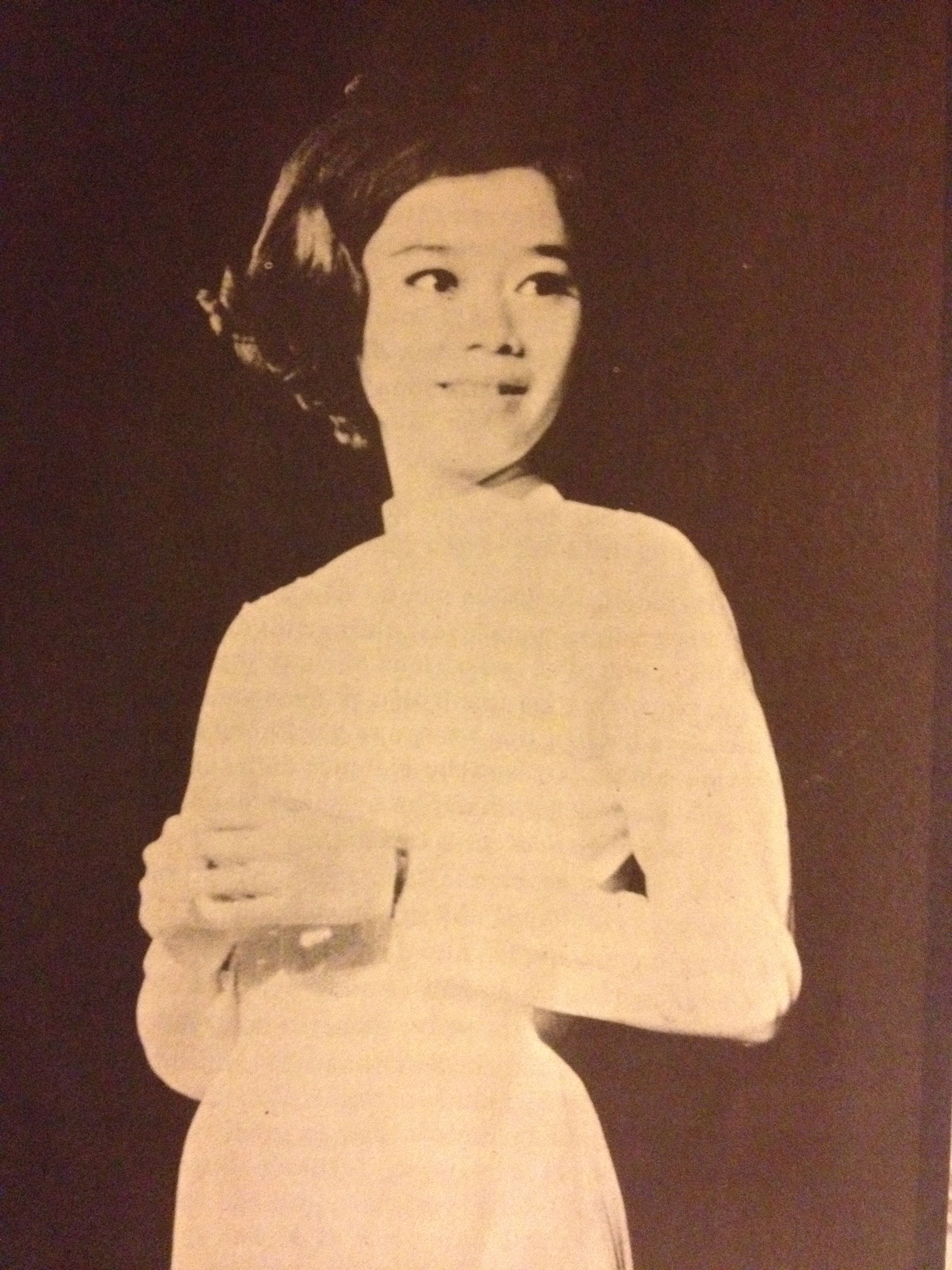
Huỳnh Kim Chi

Huỳnh Kim Chi, also known by the stage name Hoàng Oanh (born 6 November 1946), is a Vietnamese singer. Born in Mỹ Tho, she was popular during the 1970s before the Fall of Saigon, then emigrated to the United States. She is still popular among Vietnamese overseas as a singer of traditional music.
