= Vietnamese diaspora =

Diaspora community of Vietnamese people

Người Việt hải ngoại Việt kiều
- Map of the countries with a significant Vietnamese population

Total population
- 5,300,000 (official estimates)
- United States: 2,347,000 (2023)
- Cambodia: 400,000–1,000,000
- Japan: 520,154 (2023)
- France: 400,000 (2022)
- Australia: 334,781 (2021)
- South Korea: 305,936 (2025) (Note: In terms of nationality, the largest group of foreign residents came from China, with 958,959 individuals, followed by Vietnam (305,936), Thailand (188,770), the U.S. (170,251), and Uzbekistan (94,893). According to the Ministry of Justice, a short-term resident refers to a foreign national who stays in the country for 90 days or less without registering, while a long-term resident is one who registers to live in the country for 91 days or more, as reported by The Korea Herald. The foreign population in South Korea is predominantly composed of individuals in their 20s and 30s, who make up almost half of the total foreign population. Meanwhile, 15.9% are in their 40s, 12.9% are aged 60 and above, and 12.6% are in their 50s.)
- Canada: 275,530 (2021)
- Taiwan: 246,973 (2023) (Note: The number of Vietnamese nationals currently in Taiwan with a valid residence permit was 246,973 as of 30 September 2023 (148,677 males, 98,296 females). The number of Vietnamese nationals with a valid residence permit in Taiwan (including those currently not in Taiwan) was 285,173 as of 30 September 2023 (169,278 males, 115,895 females). The number of foreign spouses of Vietnamese origin in Taiwan was 111,529 as of April 2022 (2,383 males, 109,146 females). According to the Taiwanese Ministry of the Interior, between 1993 and 2021, 94,015 Vietnamese nationals became naturalized citizens in the Republic of China. It was also estimated that 70% of Vietnamese brides in Taiwan had obtained Taiwanese nationality as of 2014, with many renouncing Vietnamese citizenship in the process of naturalization, in accordance with Taiwanese law. An estimated 200,000 children were born to Vietnamese mothers and Taiwanese fathers, according to a report by Voice of Vietnam in 2014. According to Taiwanese Ministry of Education, in 2021, 105,237 children born to foreign spouses of Vietnamese origin were enrolled in educational institutions across Taiwan (4,601 in kindergartens, 23,719 in primary schools, 17,904 in secondary schools, 31,497 in high schools, and 27,516 in universities/colleges), a decrease of nearly 3,000 students compared to the previous year, which recorded a total of 108,037 students (5,168 in kindergartens, 25,752 in primary schools, 22,462 in secondary schools, 33,430 in high schools, and 21,225 in universities/colleges).)–470,000
- Germany: 226,000 (2024)
- Russia: 13,954–150,000
- Thailand: 100,000–500,000
- Laos: 100,000
- United Kingdom: 100,000
- Malaysia: 80,000
- Czech Republic: 60,000–80,000
- Poland: 40,000–50,000
- Angola: 40,000
- Mainland China: 42,000–303,000 (Note: This data only included Vietnamese Nationals in Mainland China, Excluding Gin people and data in Hong Kong, Macau and Taiwan.)/33,112 (2020) (Note: this data only included Gin people in Mainland China.)
- Bangladesh: 28,176 (2017)
- Norway: 24,530 (2021)
- Netherlands: 24,594 (2021)
- Sweden: 21,528 (2021)
- Macau: 20,000 (2018)
- United Arab Emirates: 20,000
- Saudi Arabia: 20,000
- Slovakia: 7,235 (Note: The data does not include Slovak citizens of Vietnamese origin, only Vietnamese citizens with temporary or permanent residence in Slovakia.)
- Denmark: 16,141 (2022)
- Singapore: 15,000
- Belgium: 12,000–15,000
- Finland: 14,008 (2023)
- Cyprus: 12,000
- Hong Kong: 11,000 (2020)
- New Zealand: 10,086 (2018)
- Switzerland: 8,000
- Qatar: 8,000
- Hungary: 7,304 (2016)
- Ukraine: 7,000
- Peru: 6,000 (2024)
- Ireland: 5,000
- Italy: 5,000
- Austria: 5,000
- Romania: 3,000
- Brazil: 2,926
- Bulgaria: 2,500
- New Caledonia: 2,230
- India: 1,000 (2020)
- Luxembourg: 1,000 (2024)
- Iceland: 1,000 (2024)
- Estonia: 1,000 (2024)

The Vietnamese diaspora refers to people of Vietnamese descent who live outside Vietnam.

The global overseas Vietnamese population is estimated at 5 million people. The largest communities are in the United States, with nearly 2.4 million Vietnamese Americans, alongside populations in France, Australia, and Germany. Smaller communities are found in Southeast Asia, particularly in Cambodia.

The Vietnamese diaspora emerged through waves of migration. First migration occurred during the French colonial period in the late 19th and early 20th centuries. Later on, a refugee exodus following the Vietnam War in 1975 gave rise to thriving Vietnamese communities in the West. In later decades, the diaspora grew further through family reunification, economic migration, and educational opportunities.

Overseas Vietnamese continue to maintain some cultural connections, including continued use of the Vietnamese language, observance of traditional festivals such as Tết (Lunar New Year), and familial and economic connections, including approximately $14 billion USD in annual remittances to Vietnam.

== Terminology ==
In Vietnam, the term Việt kiều is usually used to describe Vietnamese people living abroad. Some overseas Vietnamese use the terms người Việt hải ngoại ('Overseas Vietnamese'), a neutral designation, or người Việt tự do ('Free Vietnamese'), which carries a political connotation.

== History ==
These are some of the categories of overseas Vietnamese:

- People who left Vietnam before 1975. Most of these populations reside in neighboring countries, such as Cambodia, Laos, Thailand and China, before French colonization. During the French colonial era, tens of thousands of Vietnamese migrated to Metropolitan France as students or workers.
- People who fled Vietnam in the aftermath of the Vietnam War, some of them via Operation New Life and Operation Babylift. The largest majority were Vietnamese boat people and their descendants. This is the largest Vietnamese diaspora group, found mainly in North America, Western Europe, Hong Kong, and Australasia.
- People who migrated from Vietnam to other parts of the Soviet bloc during the Cold War era and chose to remain outside Vietnam after the Soviet collapse, and their descendants. This is the second-largest Vietnamese diaspora group, found mainly in the former Soviet Union and the ex-Warsaw Pact countries of Eastern Europe.
- Economic migrants who work in other Asian countries such Taiwan, Japan and South Korea. This includes Vietnamese women who married men from these countries through illegal marriage agencies. These agencies are the source of social tension, controversy, and have been criticized for resembling human trafficking. Some women in this category underwent violence by their foreign husbands.
- Vietnamese living in the Middle East and North Africa, in particular the United Arab Emirates, Egypt, Morocco, Qatar and Kuwait. Some members of this population studied overseas and sought work in other countries.

According to a 2014 report by the Associated Press, "women make up at least two-thirds of workers who leave the country", and sometimes leave fathers behind to care for children. The report also said that "the total amount of remittances sent back from all Vietnamese workers overseas now exceeds $2 billion a year."

As of 2020, 190,000 Vietnamese were studying abroad. Most were studying in Australia (30,000), the United States (29,000), Canada (21,000), the UK (12,000) and Asian countries (70,000); and an unknown number of illegal Vietnamese immigrants, as unveiled by the Essex lorry deaths throughout networks of illegal human trades spanned from Asia to Europe.

== By country ==
=== United States ===
The United States is home to the largest population of overseas Vietnamese, which has grown more significantly since the 1970s. As of 2022, more than 1.3 million Vietnamese immigrants reside in the U.S., and the broader Vietnamese American population, which includes US-born individuals of Vietnamese descent, exceeds 2.3 million.

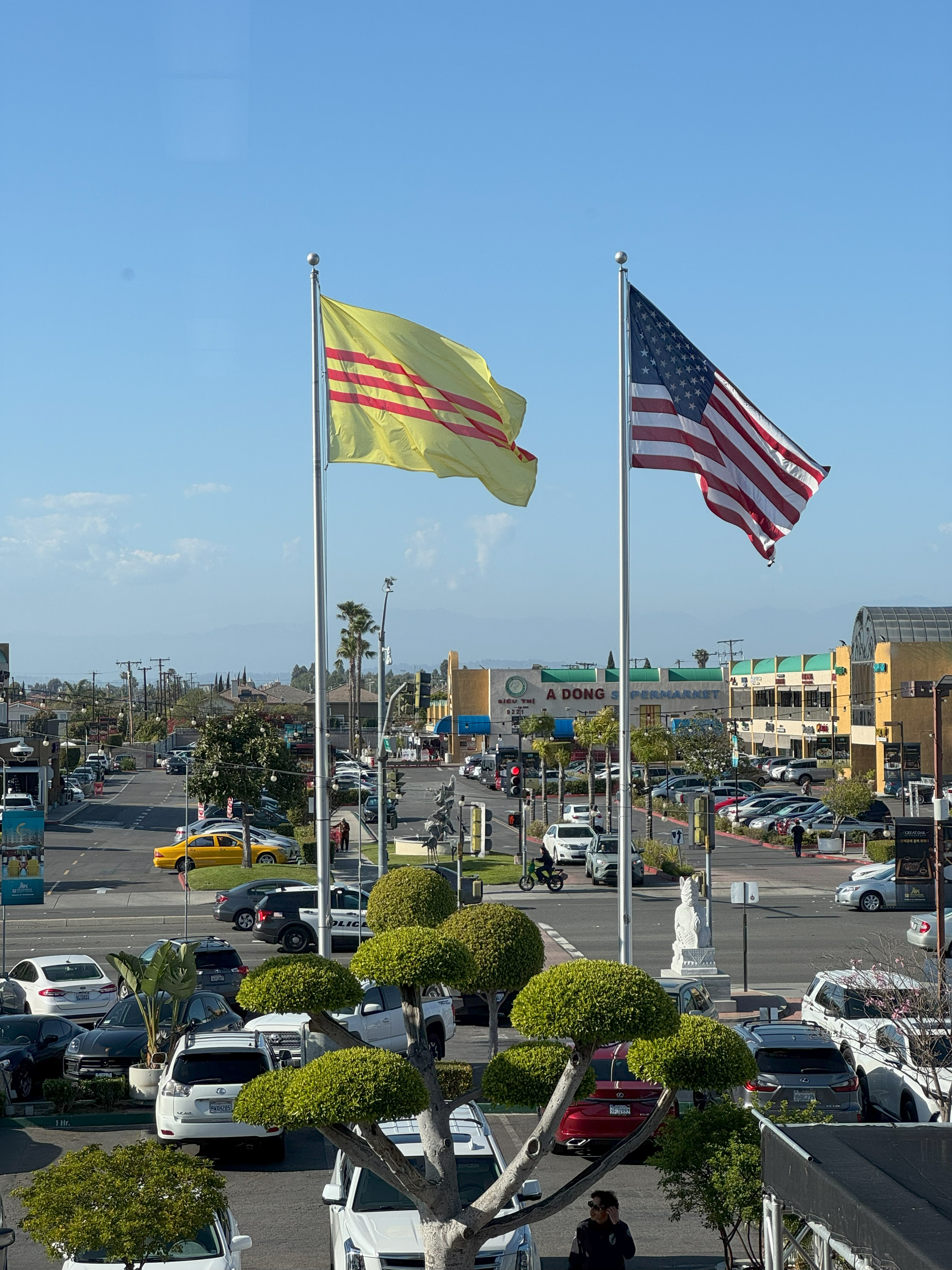
Flags at Asian Garden Mall in Westminster, California

Mass migration from Vietnam began after the fall of Saigon in 1975, marking the end of the Vietnam War. During the North Vietnamese military offensive of March 1975, some South Vietnamese citizens were pushed farther and farther south into Saigon. On April 30, the final U.S. troops and diplomats left Saigon and the country came under the control of the Provisional Revolutionary Government. As a result, the North Vietnamese Army (NVA) took control of South Vietnam, leading some South Vietnamese to become refugees and immigrate to the United States.

Most immigrants fled to the United States as refugees following the end of the Vietnam War, arriving in three distinct waves from the 1960s to the 1990s. The first wave consisted mainly of South Vietnamese citizens and military personnel who had associations with the South Vietnamese government and the United States. The second wave brought more refugees from the former South Vietnam to the United States in what became known as the "boat people crisis." This wave was characterized by mainly rural people who lacked the education or wealth of the first wave, and some ethnic Chinese who were fleeing persecution by the Vietnamese government. The final wave took place in the 1980s into the 1990s. This group included thousands who were the children of Vietnamese mothers and American soldiers.

By 1979, the United Nations recognized that the Vietnamese refugee crisis was a "world problem," which led to the First Geneva Conference on Indochinese Refugees in July, 1979. The United States, United Kingdom, Australia, France, and Canada each agreed to accept refugees for resettlement, and Vietnamese refugee entries to the U.S. to peaked from 1979 to 1982. That year, President Jimmy Carter doubled the number of Southeast Asian refugees accepted into the United States, from 7,000 to 14,000. 62% of Americans said they disapproved of the measure.

The South Vietnamese coming to the U.S. in the second wave did not come willingly. They were forced out of their homes by the NVA and sought refuge in the United States. Some of these people felt betrayed by the U.S.'s handling of the situation in Vietnam and felt conflicted about making the journey there. Nearly all the Vietnamese migrants to the United States during this time were listed as refugees, not as immigrants, because of the forced manner in which they had been exiled to the United States; 99% of Vietnamese newcomers to the United States who received a Green Card in 1982 fell into this category.

The majority live in metropolitan areas in the western half of the country, especially in California and Texas. There are particularly large communities in Orange County, California, San Jose, California, Houston, Texas and Seattle, Washington. Those who fled to escape the North Vietnamese takeover are generally antagonistic toward the communist government of Vietnam. In 2015, 30% of Vietnamese Americans had attained a bachelor's degree or higher (compared to 19% for the general population). Specifically, 21% of Vietnamese Americans had attained a bachelor's degree (37% for U.S. born Vietnamese and 18% for foreign-born Vietnamese), and 8.9% had attained a postgraduate degree (14% for U.S. born Vietnamese and 7% for foreign-born Vietnamese), compared to 11% postgraduate degree attainment among the general American population.

=== Cambodia ===
Vietnamese constitute about 5% of the population of Cambodia. Vietnamese people are the top tourist group in Cambodia, with 130,831, up 19% as of 2011.

=== China ===
The Vietnamese in China are known as the Gin ethnic group, arriving in Southeastern China beginning in the 16th century. They largely reside in the province of Guangxi and speak Vietnamese and a local variety of Cantonese.

As of 2020, 79,000 Vietnamese nationals were living in China. They formed the second largest group of expatriates in China, while Burmese nationals were the largest.

=== France ===
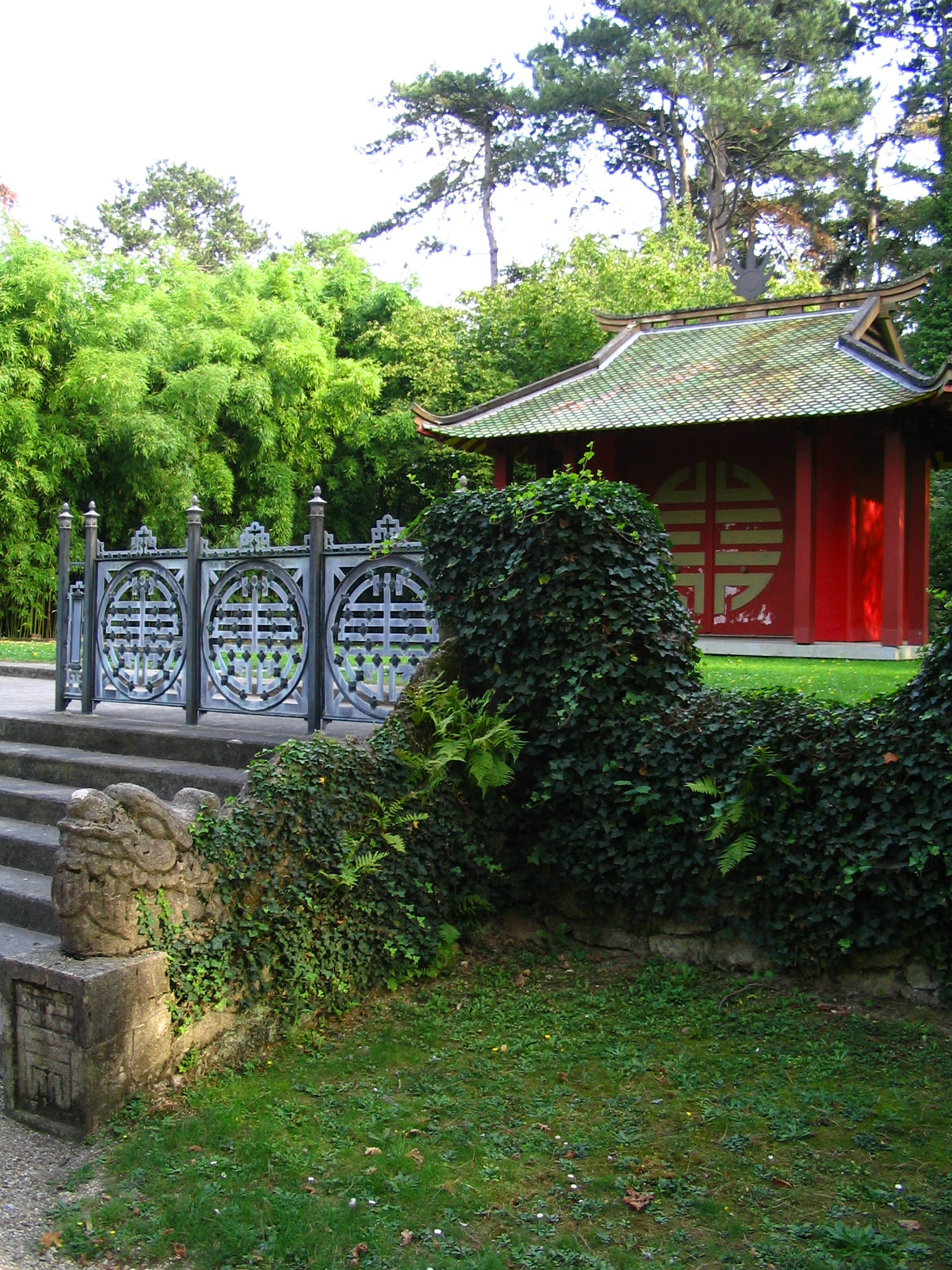
The Temple du Souvenir Indochinois in the Bois de Vincennes, erected in 1907, is a monument built by the earliest waves of Vietnamese migrants to France.

The number of ethnic Vietnamese living in France is estimated to be about 350,000 as of 2014. France was the first Western country where Vietnamese migrants settled due to the colonization of Vietnam by France that began in the 1850s. The colonial period saw a representation of Vietnamese students in France, and professional and blue-collar workers, with some settling permanently. The country would continue to be home to by far the largest overseas Vietnamese population outside Asia until the 1980s, when a higher number of Vietnam War refugees resettled in the United States.

A number of Vietnamese loyal to the colonial government and Vietnamese married to French colonists emigrated to France following Vietnam's independence through the Geneva Accords in 1954. During the Vietnam War, a number of students and those involved in commerce from South Vietnam continued to arrive in France. The largest influx of Vietnamese people arrived in France as refugees after the Fall of Saigon and end of the Vietnam War in 1975. Vietnamese refugees who settled in France usually had higher levels of education and affluence than Vietnamese refugees who settled in North America, Australia, and the rest of Europe, possibly due to cultural familiarity with French culture and that some Vietnamese families had already settled in France.

Most Vietnamese in France live in Paris and the surrounding Île-de-France area, while some reside in urban centers in the south-east of the country, primarily Marseille, Lyon, and Toulouse. Earlier Vietnamese migrants settled in the cities of Lille and Bordeaux.

A generation of Vietnamese refugees continues to hold on to traditional values. The later generations of French-born Vietnamese identify with French culture rather than Vietnamese, as most were raised and brought up in the French system rather than the Vietnamese one. Some of the French media and politicians view the Vietnamese community as a "model minority", in part because they are represented as having a high degree of integration within the French society and having high economic and academic success.

The Vietnamese community in France is divided between those who oppose the communist Hanoi government and those who are supportive of it. This division in the community has been present since the 1950s when some Vietnamese students and workers in France supported and praised the communist Viet Minh's policies back home, while Vietnamese loyal to the colonial or non-communist governments and immigrated to France were largely anti-communist. This political rift increased after the fall of Saigon in 1975 when anti-communist refugees from South Vietnam arrived and established community networks and institutions. The two camps have contradictory political goals and ideologies. Such political divisions have prevented the Vietnamese in France from forming a more unified community in their host nation, as their counterparts have in North America and Australia (1980).

=== Australia ===
In the 2021 Australian Census, 334,793 people claimed Vietnamese ancestry, representing 1.3% of the country's population. There have been two waves of Vietnamese migration to Australia. The first was in the aftermath of the Vietnam War, where in the 20 years between 1975 and 1995, more than 110,000 Vietnamese refugees came to Australia. The second wave started in the 2000s and continued afterwards.

Year of arrival for Vietnam-born Australians, according to the 2021 Census:

1961-1970: 513 individuals | 0.2% of Vietnam-born

1971-1980: 29,767 individuals | 11.5% of Vietnam-born

1981-1990: 69,576 individuals | 27.0% of Vietnam-born

1991-2000: 42,472 individuals | 16.5% of Vietnam-born

2001-2010: 38,674 individuals | 15.0% of Vietnam-born

2011-2021: 67,186 individuals | 26.1% of Vietnam-born

First-generation Vietnamese Australians who came as refugees varied in income and social class. Of those from the Vietnam War era, some Vietnamese Australians are white-collar professionals, while others work primarily in blue-collar jobs. In 2001, the labour participation rate for Vietnamese refugees was 61%, about the same as that of Australian-born residents (63%).

In 2006, the surname Nguyễn became the seventh-most-common family name in Australia (second to Smith in the Melbourne phone book).

=== New Zealand ===
According to the 2018 census, 10,086 New Zealanders identify themselves with the Vietnamese ethnic group. Some of them came to New Zealand to escape religious persecution or war.

=== Canada ===
According to the 2016 census, Canada has 240,615 people who identify as ethnic Vietnamese.

=== Germany ===
Vietnamese are the largest Asian ethnic group in Germany. As of 2023, there are about 215,000 people of Vietnamese descent in Germany. In Western Germany, most Vietnamese arrived in the 1970s or 1980s as refugees from the Vietnam War. The larger Vietnamese community in Eastern Germany traces its origins to assistance agreements between the East German and the North Vietnamese government. Under these agreements, guest workers from Vietnam were brought to East Germany, where they made up the largest immigrant group.

=== Czech Republic ===
The number of Vietnamese people in the Czech Republic was estimated at 61,012 at the 2009 census, while later figures have placed the number as high as 80,000.

Most Vietnamese immigrants in the Czech Republic reside in Prague, where there is an enclave called Sapa. Unlike Vietnamese immigrants in Western Europe and North America, these immigrants were usually communist cadres studying or working abroad who decided to stay after the collapse of communism in Central and Eastern Europe. The Vietnamese surname Nguyen is listed as the most common of foreign surnames in the Czech Republic and is the ninth most common surname in the country overall. (It is noted that female and male forms of the same Czech surnames were counted separately, while the total number of Nguyens refers to both male and female bearers of the surname.)

=== United Kingdom ===
Vietnamese residing in the United Kingdom number around 55,000 people, in contrast to the trend of the U.K. tending to have the largest East and South East Asian diasporas in Europe. In the 1980s, Prime Minister Margaret Thatcher agreed to take quotas of refugees and 12,000 boat people came to Britain. Some illegal Vietnamese immigrants abroad reside in the United Kingdom. There are Vietnamese, lacking official papers and denied official assistance, may become involved in human trafficking, such as unknowingly being hired in cannabis factories. The Essex lorry deaths highlighted the issue of illegal Vietnamese immigrants being smuggled from poverty-stricken regions of Vietnam to other parts of the world.

=== Poland ===
Around 50,000 Vietnamese live in Poland. They publish a number of newspapers, both pro- and anti-Communist. The first immigrants were Vietnamese students at Polish universities in the post-World War II era. These numbers increased during the Vietnam War, when agreements between the communist Vietnamese and Polish governments allowed Vietnamese guest workers to obtain industrial training in Poland. Vietnamese immigrants also arrived after 1989.

=== Belgium ===
An estimated 14,000 ethnic Vietnamese reside in Belgium as of 2012. Similar to the Vietnamese community in France, the Vietnamese Belgian community traces its roots to before the end of the Vietnam War. Beginning in the 1960s, Belgium became an alternative destination to France for South Vietnamese seeking higher education and career opportunities abroad. A larger influx of Vietnamese arrived as refugees after the Fall of Saigon. After the Berlin Wall fell in 1989, a number of Vietnamese workers in former Soviet Bloc countries who were sponsored by the communist Vietnamese government also sought asylum in Belgium.

The Vietnamese Belgian population largely resides in and around the capital of Brussels or in the southern French-speaking Wallonia region, especially around the city of Liège. As in France, South Vietnamese refugees to Belgium were largely of higher social standing and integrated easier into their host country's society than their peers who settled in North America, Australia and the rest of Europe due to better linguistic and cultural knowledge.

=== Russia ===
Vietnamese people in Russia form the 72nd-largest ethnic minority community in Russia according to the 2002 census. The census estimated their population at 26,205 individuals, making them among the smaller groups of Việt Kiều.

=== Norway ===
An estimated 21,700 ethnic Vietnamese live in Norway as of 2014, and the country has hosted a Vietnamese community since refugee arrivals after the end of the Vietnam War in 1975. The Vietnamese are considered among the best integrated non-Western immigrant groups in Norway, with higher rates of Norwegian citizenship among immigrants and success rates in education on par with those of ethnic Norwegians.

=== Netherlands ===
About 19,000 ethnic Vietnamese reside in the Netherlands according to a 2010 estimate. The community largely consists of South Vietnamese refugees who first arrived in 1978. A smaller number of North Vietnamese workers arrived from eastern Europe after the fall of the Berlin Wall.

=== Bulgaria ===
An estimated 2,600 ethnic Vietnamese live in Bulgaria according to a 2015 estimate.

Under international agreements in 1980, Bulgaria and other Warsaw Pact members accepted Vietnamese guest workers who were sponsored by the communist government into the country as a manual labour workforce. At one point, over 35,000 Vietnamese people worked in Bulgaria between 1980 and 1991 and some Vietnamese students completed their higher education at Bulgarian universities.

=== South Korea ===
As of 2011, there were over 110,000 ethnic Vietnamese people in South Korea, making them the second largest minority group in the country. Vietnamese in South Korea consist mainly of migrant workers and women introduced to South Korean husbands through marriage agencies. In the 13th century, thousands of Vietnamese fled to Korea after the overthrow of the Vietnamese Lý dynasty, where they were received by King Gojong of Goryeo.

=== Malaysia ===
The Fall of Saigon in 1975 at the end of the Vietnam War saw some Vietnamese refugees escaping by boats to Malaysia. The first refugee boat arrived in Malaysia in May 1975, carrying 47 people. A refugee camp was established later at Pulau Bidong in August 1978 with assistance of the United Nations and became a refugee processing center for Vietnamese seeking residency in other countries. The majority of Vietnamese in Malaysia consist of skilled and semi-skilled workers who arrived during the 1990s as economic cooperation between Vietnam and Malaysia increased.

=== Taiwan ===
Of the foreign ethnic groups in Taiwan, Vietnamese has a resident population of around 200,000, including students and migrant workers. Vietnamese in Taiwan largely arrived as workers in the manufacturing industry or as domestic helpers. There are Vietnamese women married to Taiwanese men through international matchmaking services in Vietnam, while there is the illegality of such services in the country.

=== Japan ===
Over 135,000 Vietnamese people resided in Japan at the end of 2014. In 2019, around 371,755 Vietnamese people lived in Japan, making it the third largest foreign community in the country. At least 190,000 are "skilled trainees". Vietnamese people first came to Japan as students beginning in the 20th century. Most of the community is composed of refugees admitted in the 1970s and 1980s, and a smaller proportion of migrant laborers who began arriving in 1994.

=== Laos ===
As Vietnam and Laos are neighbors, there has been population migrations between the territories making up the two respective countries. When Laos was a French protectorate in the first half of the 20th century, the French colonial administration brought some Vietnamese people to Laos to work as civil servants. This policy was the object of opposition by Laotian nationals, who in the 1930s made an unsuccessful attempt to replace the local government with Laotian civil servants.

=== Singapore ===
There are about 15,000 Vietnamese people in Singapore, primarily composed of restaurant/hawker centre service workers and overseas students. Waves of Vietnamese refugees and immigrants to Singapore in the 1970s mainly include boat people who escaped Vietnam during the aftermath of the Vietnam War, who were initially housed in an ex-military barracks turned refugee camp. 32,457 Vietnamese refugees were hosted in Singapore from 1976 to the 1990s, with around 5,000 settling throughout the 1970s.

=== Philippines ===
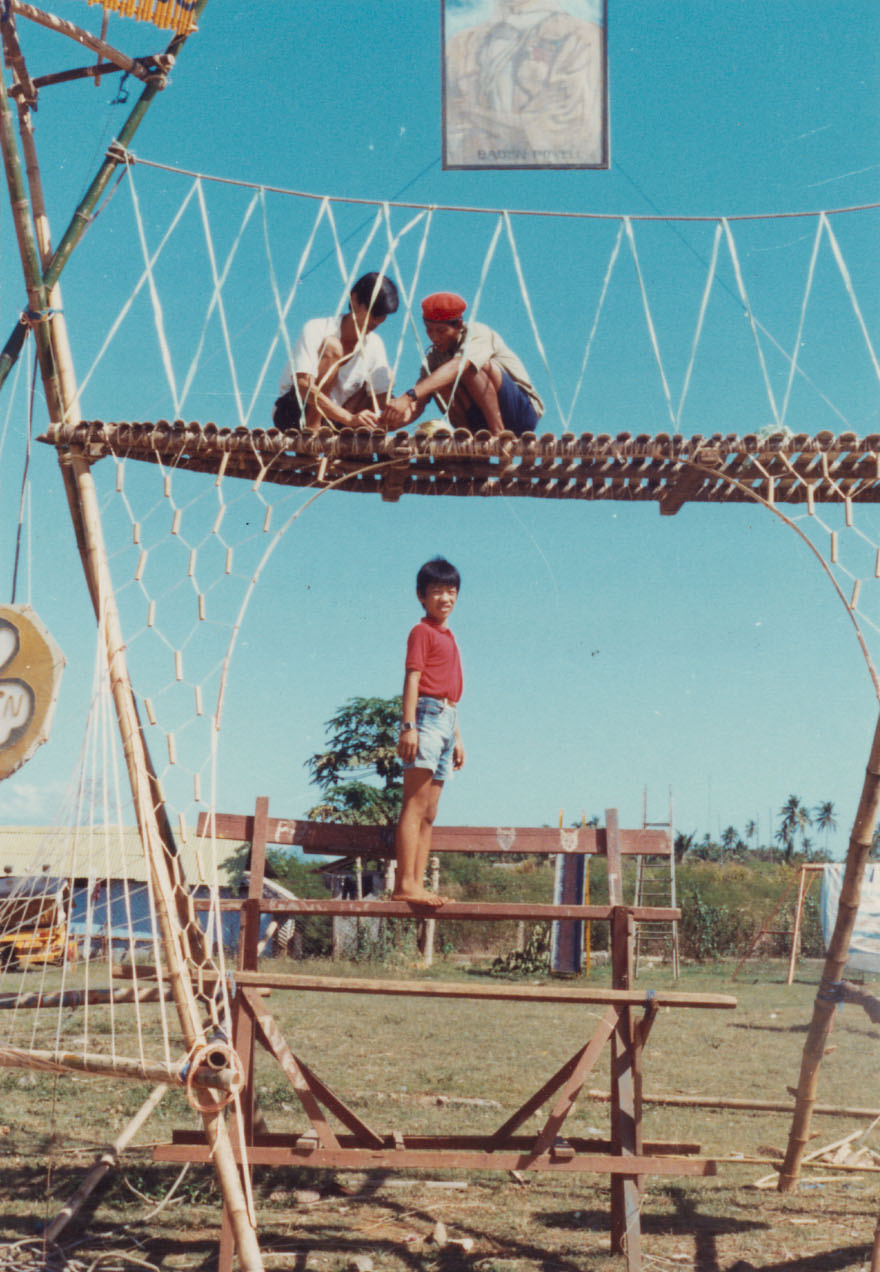
Vietnamese refugee in 1990 in Boy Scouts, Palawan, Philippines

During the Indochina refugee crisis, around 400,000 Vietnamese refugees landed on the shores of Palawan in the western Philippines after the fall of South Vietnam in 1975. They were housed in a temporary refugee camp known as the Philippine First Asylum Center (PFAC) in the city of Puerto Princesa. The center was built in 1979 by the Philippine government in partnership with the United Nations High Commission for Refugees through the initiative of the Philippine Catholic Church. Most of the refugees were moved to the Philippine Refugee Processing Center in Bataan before being resettled to other countries. By the time the refugee campes were closed in 1996, around 2,710 Vietnamese refugees remained in the country. Unlike other neighboring countries which implemented forced repatriation, the Philippines was the only country that allowed the refugees to stay indefinitely. The refugees established a community called Viet-Ville (French for 'Viet-Town'), also in Puerto Princesa. At the time, it became the centre of Vietnamese commerce and culture, complete with Vietnamese restaurants, shops, Catholic churches and Buddhist temples. In the decades that followed, the Vietnamese population dwindled as they finally got approval for resettlement in the United States, Canada, Australia or Western Europe. By 2005, two of the former refugees remained, both of whom are married to locals. Viet-Ville today remains a destination for local tourists.

=== Israel ===
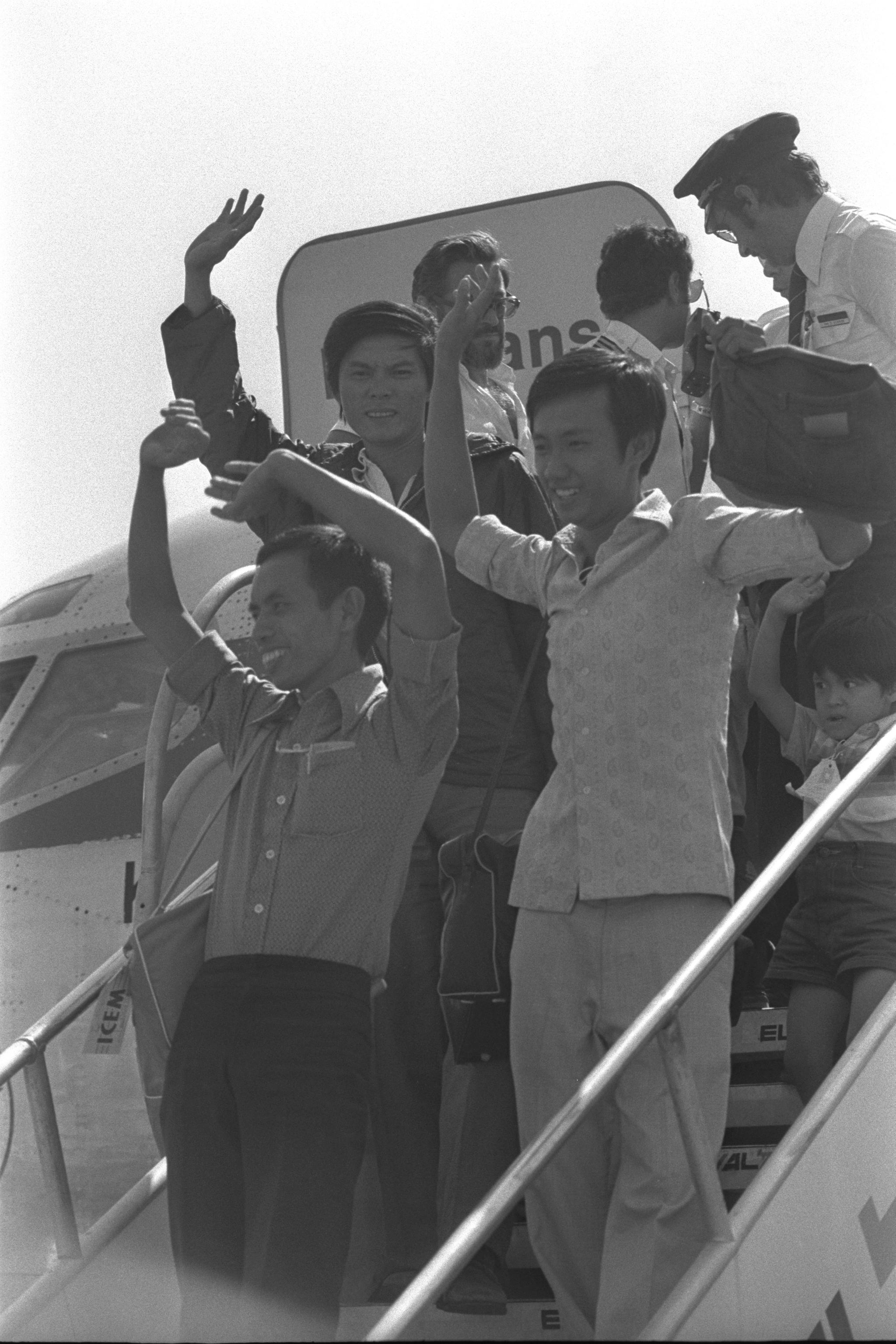
Vietnamese refugees arriving at Ben-Gurion International Airport, In Israel

The number of Vietnamese people in Israel is estimated at 150 to 200. Most of them came between 1976 and 1979 when about 360 Vietnamese refugees were granted political asylum by Prime Minister Menachem Begin. Most later left Israel, mainly for Europe or North America, to reunite with their extended families. A number of second generation descendants have assimilated into Israeli culture, married Israelis, and speak Hebrew.

== Relations with Vietnam ==
Relations between overseas Vietnamese populations and the Vietnamese government range between polarities of geniality and overt contempt. Some overseas Vietnamese (who fled from South Vietnam following its fall) residing in North America, Western Europe, and Australia are opposed to the government of Vietnam. The smaller population of overseas Vietnamese residing in Europe, the Middle East, Africa and Asia, most of whom have been sent for training in formerly communist countries, generally maintain positive or more neutral, if not very friendly relations with the government. Some of these Eastern European Vietnamese are from Northern Vietnam and usually have personal or familial affiliations with the communist government. Those who left before the South Vietnamese exodus starting in 1975, largely residing in France, generally identify their sentiments as somewhere in between the two polarities. A portion of the Vietnamese diaspora who fled from South Vietnam after its fall and later living in Western Europe, North America, and Oceania have been religious (Christian, Buddhist, Caodaist) and anti-communist, while the Vietnamese living in Eastern Europe and Asia are more aligned to irreligion, and, to a lesser extent, folk religions and Buddhism.

The former South Vietnamese Prime Minister Nguyễn Cao Kỳ returned to Vietnam in 2004 and was generally positive about his experience. Kỳ's reconciliation efforts were met with backlash by a portion of overseas Vietnamese, who called him a "traitor" and a "communist collaborator" for working with the communist regime.

The government enacted laws to make it easier for overseas Vietnamese to do business in Vietnam, including laws allowing them to own land. The first company in Vietnam to be registered to an overseas Vietnamese was Highlands Coffee, a chain of specialty coffee shops, in 1998.

In June 2007, then-Vietnamese President Nguyễn Minh Triết visited the United States, and one of his scheduled stops was in the vicinity of Orange County, home to Little Saigon, a Vietnamese diaspora community. Details of his plans were not announced beforehand due to concerns about protests. A crowd of anti-communist protesters demonstrated, and thousands of people in Washington, D.C. and Orange County also protested Triết's visit.

== See also ==
- Diasporic Vietnamese narratives
- Vietnamese Diasporic Music
- Overseas Vietnamese Buddhist temples
- List of Vietnamese People
- Vietnamese Boat People
- Growing Up American
