= Chế Linh =

Vietnamese singer (born 1942)

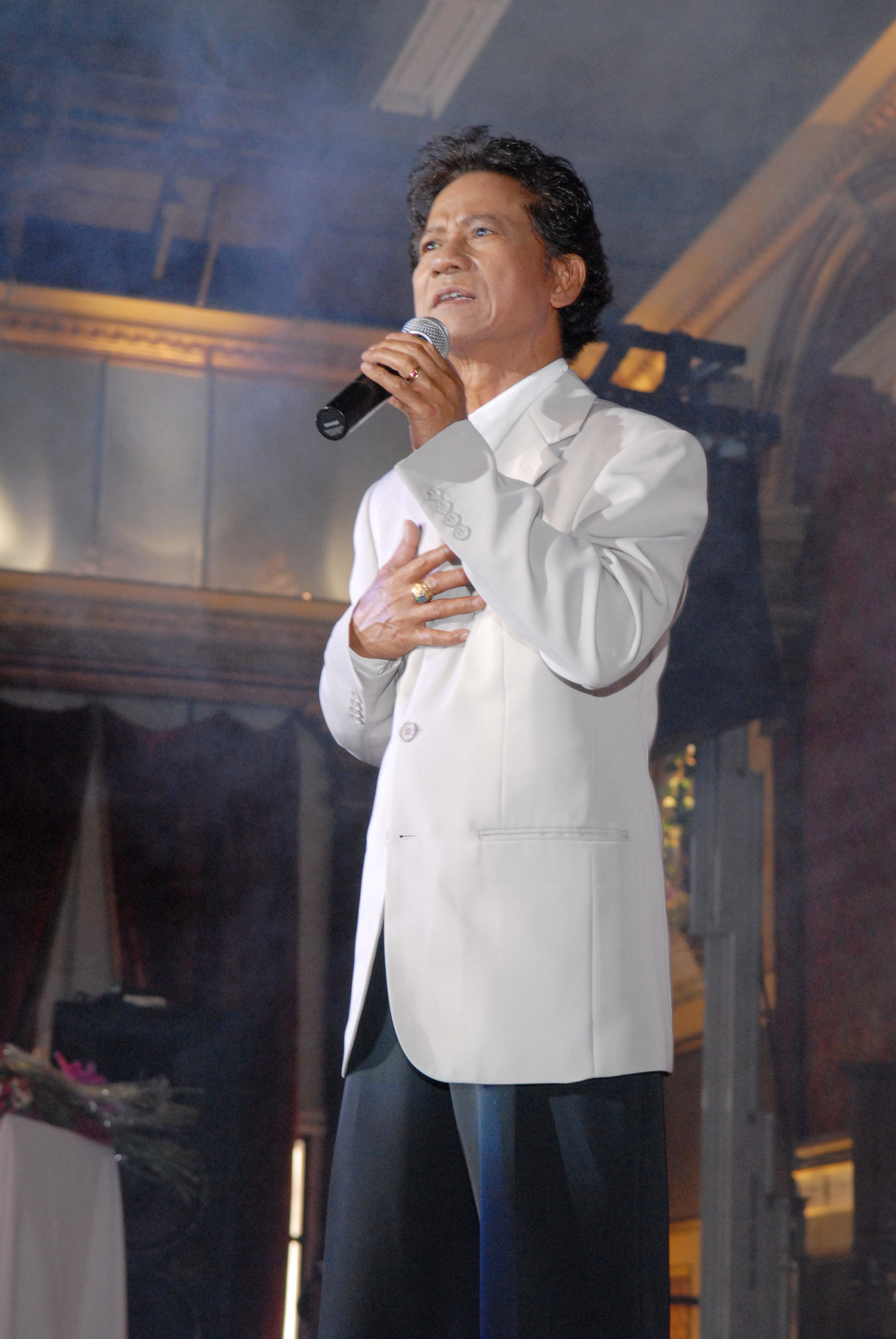
- Born: Lưu Văn Liên; 3 April 1942 (age 84); Phan Rang, Ninh Thuan, French Indochina
- Other names: Tú Nhi; Lưu Trần Lê
- Years active: 1960–present
- Spouse: Nga Vuong (m. 1975)
- Musical career
- Genres: Pop; bolero
- Occupations: Singer; songwriter; musician; businessman
- Instruments: Vocals; guitar; keyboards
- Labels: Lang Van; Thuy Nga; Asia
- Website: chelinh.com

Chế Linh (Eastern Cham: Jamlen; b. 1942) is a Vietnamese popular singer, songwriter. An ethnic Cham, his stage name Chế Linh is a Vietnamese transcription of his Cham name. However, like many Cham people, he also has an official Vietnamese legal name, Lưu Văn Liên.

He rose to fame in the 1960s and is considered one of the four most renowned male voices of early Vietnamese bolero music ("Tứ trụ nhạc vàng"), each with a distinct style. The other three are Duy Khánh, Nhật Trường, and Hùng Cường.

== Early life ==
In 1958, when Che Linh was 16 years old, President Ngo Dinh Diem forbade the teaching of the Cham language in the Cham villages. The Cham language was a prestige language considered a second language since the Bảo Đại’s era.

This discrimination toward the minority group created conflict between the Chams and the Kinh inhabitants. When the Chams came to town, they were stopped and being persecuted. Che Linh was injured on several incidents. The government ignored these incidents.

Che Linh moved to Saigon where he found a small job with a respected employer. After nine months, Che Linh decided to go back to school. He attended Bo De and later Nguyen Cong Tru.

== Career ==
=== 1960-1961 ===
Biet Chinh Biên Hòa Musical Group was selecting new singers to entertain a far-away village in the Biên Hòa Province.

Che Linh participated and won first prize. Not considering singing as a career at the time, but only because the pay is considerably high. Two years later, the group faded and dissolved and Che Linh became a driver for heavy construction organization in Bien Hoa. The love for music and as a hobby, Che Linh continues to learn the music, train his voice and composed several songs. Che Linh's musical career strongly excelled, and his first two songs were born: "Dem buon tinh le” and “Dem buoc co don”

Recognizing that music is the shortest way to bring understanding between the Kinh and the Chams and all the other ethnic groups, Che Linh promised to continue and excel in the musical industry. With his effort and talents, Che Linh became a famous star and had sung together with many artists such as Anh Ngọc, Duy Khánh, Thái Thanh, Thanh Thúy, Minh Hiếu, Tùng Lâm. Continental Productions produced his first record, "Vùng Biển Trời Và Màu Áo Em”. Che Linh then signed with several Viet Nam Record Companies.

=== 1964-1965 ===
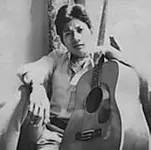
Che Linh with a guitar

He produced and wrote many songs.

=== 1972 ===
Awarded by Kim Khánh for Best Male Artist/Vocal which was organized by the Daily Newspaper Trang Den. The Government of South Vietnam then forbade Che Linh's voice and songs during the summer war period.

=== 1975 ===
Che Linh was hoping to have his music released from the forbidden list, however he was jailed as a reactionary at Song Mao, then My Duc.

=== 1978 ===
He was released from prison 28 months later.

=== 1980 ===
Escaped to Malaysia and later settled in Canada where he now resides in Toronto, and where he is presently performing, singing, writing and producing music.

21st century

His songs stay popular both domestically and among Viet diasporas. In 2007 he performed in Vietnam again after decades abroad, during an event hosted by UNESCO. From 2011 onward he returned to Vietnam for several tours.

== Compositions ==
All of Che Linh's songs which he wrote goes under the name of Tu Nhi.

Title	Year	Composer
Đêm buồn tỉnh lẻ	1962	Tú Nhi & Bằng Giang
Bài ca kỷ niệm	1962	Tú Nhi & Bằng Giang
Đếm bước cô đơn	1963	Tú Nhi & Bằng Giang
Thương Hận	1966	Tú Nhi & Hồ Đình Phương
Lời thương chưa ngỏ	1966	Tú Nhi
Ngày đó xa rồi	1967	Tú Nhi
Xin làm người xa lạ	1967	Tú Nhi
Nỗi buốn sa mạc	1968	Tú Nhi & Tuấn Lê
Lời kẽ đăng trình	1968	Tú Nhi
Trong tầm mắt đời	1968	Tú Nhi
Đoạn cuối tình yêu	1968	Tú Nhi
Đoạn buồn đêm mưa	1968	Tú Nhi
Đoạn khúc đọan trường	1969	Tú Nhi
Mai lỡ mình xa nhau	1969	Tú Nhi
Khu Phố ngày xưa	1969	Tú Nhi
Nụ Cười Chua Cay	1970	Tú Nhi & Song An
Mưa bên song cửa	1972	Tú Nhi
Người về trong chiêm bao	1973	Tú Nhi
Xin yêu tôi bằng tình người	1974	Tú Nhi
Mưa buồn tỉnh lẻ	1972	Tú Nhi & Bằng Giang
Tình khúc đoạn trường 2	1976	Tú Nhi
Tâm tư kẻ tù	1976	Tú Nhi
Lời lữ khách	1980	Tú Nhi
Sao đổi ngôi	1976	Tú Nhi
Xuân quê hương xuân lạc xứ	1980	Tú Nhi
Như giọt sương mai	1980	Tú Nhi
Ngày đó quê hương tôi	1980	Tú Nhi
Tôi đã hát,sẽ hát,và phải hát	1980	Tú Nhi
Vùng trời đó tôi thương	1980	Tú Nhi
Đêm trên đường phố lạ	1984	Tú Nhi
Em bên đời ngẫn ngơ	1995	Tú Nhi
Hết rồi	1996	Tú Nhi & Anh Hoàng
Mù	1997	Tú Nhi
Cứ tưởng còn trong tay	1998	Tú Nhi
Một trời thương nhớ	2000	Tú Nhi
Một góc phố buuồn	2002	Tú Nhi
Thành phố buồn 2 (Thành phố buồn hơn)	2002	Tú Nhi
Nỗi buồn của tôi	2002	Tú Nhi
Bài ca không tựa	2002	Tú Nhi
