= Duy Khánh =

Vietnamese singer

- Born: Nguyễn Văn Diệp; 1 June 1936; An Cư, Triệu Phong, Quảng Trị
- Died: 12 February 2003 Orange County, California, United States
- Genres: Nhạc vàng, Nhạc hải ngoại, Nhạc quê hương
- Occupation: Musician/Songwriter/Producer
- Spouse(s): Âu Phùng, Thúy Hoa

Nguyễn Văn Diệp, stage name Duy Khánh (born 1 June 1936 in Triệu Phước Village, Triệu Phong District, Quang Tri Province, Việt Nam – died 12 February 2003, Fountain Valley, CA, USA) was a Vietnamese singer-songwriter. He was one of the many singers and songwriters to settle in "Quận Cam" (Orange County) after the Fall of Saigon.

He became famous in Vietnam in the 1960s, initially with the folk song genre and those composed by songwriter Phạm Duy. Later, he was inducted as one of the top four male singers of The Four Pillars of Vietnamese Golden Music Era. The other three were Nhật Trường, Hùng Cường and Chế Linh. He was known as a talented songwriter with more than 30 songs.

== Personal life and career ==
Duy Khánh was born in 1936 in An Cư Village, Triệu Phước Commune, Triệu Phong District, Quảng Trị, Viet Nam. He was the youngest son in a family of descendants of the Duke and Deputy Chief Minister, Nguyễn Văn Tường of the Nguyễn dynasty.

In 1952, Duy Khánh won the first prize in a singing contest on a French radio station in Huế with the song Trăng Thanh Bình (Peaceful Moon). He then moved to Saigon to pursue a career in singing.

In Saigon, he began to sing under the stage name Hoàng Thanh. He became one of the three most popular male singers of the time, along with Duy Trác and Anh Ngọc. During this period, his name was associated with folk songs and "new folk songs" composed by Phạm Duy: Vợ chồng quê, Ngày trở về, Nhớ người thương binh, Tình nghèo, Quê nghèo, Về miền Trung ... He later changed his stage name to Duy Khánh - which included "Duy" from Phạm Duy, and "Khánh" from one of his friends' name.

He started writing music in 1959. His music was often about the love for his homeland, and was influenced by the folk songs of Huế.

In 1964, he married Âu Phùng, a Vietnamese-Chinese dancer from the band Lưu Bình Hồng, and had two children with her. The couple later divorced.

In 1965, he and female singer Thái Thanh recorded Pham Duy's epic poem Con đường cái quan. The two later sang the song Mẹ Việt Nam (Vietnamese Mother). These two epic songs are still associated with the vocals of Thái Thanh's and Duy Khánh's vocals.

After the Fall of Saigon on April 30, 1975, he stayed in Vietnam and was banned from singing for many years. He then founded the band Quê Hương, with members including musicians Châu Kỳ, Nhật Ngân, Ngọc Minh, Nhã Phương, Bảo Yến, and others.

In the mid-1970s, he married Thúy Hoa and lived in Vung Tau. The couple have three children together, one boy and two girls, who all now reside in Orange County, California. He converted to Catholicism and adopted the saint name Michael.

After moving to the United States in 1988, he sang exclusively for the Làng Văn Center, and appeared in a number of videos produced by the Asia Center. Later, he founded Trường Sơn Center and continued singing and teaching music until his death.

He died on February 12, 2003, at Fountain Valley Hospital, Orange County, California, at the age of 67.

== Compositions ==
- Ai ra xứ Huế (1964)
- Anh lên rừng núi cao nguyên
- Anh về một chiều mưa (1962)
- Bao giờ em quên (1963)
- Biết trả lời sao (1965)
- Chuyện buồn ngày xưa (1962)
- Đâu bóng người xưa (1961)
- Đêm bơ vơ (1973)
- Đêm nao trăng sáng (1959)
- Điệu buồn chia xa (1994)
- Đi từ đồng ruộng bao la (1969)
- Đường trần lá đổ
- Giã từ Đà Lạt (1964)
- Hát trên đỉnh đèo (1991)
- Hoài ca (1956)
- Huế đẹp Huế thơ
- Lối về đất mẹ (1965)
- Màu tím hoa sim (1964)
- Một lần trong đời
- Mưa bay trong đời (1966)

- Mừng anh chiến sĩ
- Mùa chia tay (1965)
- Nỗi buồn 20 (1967)
- Nỗi niềm riêng (1988)
- Nén hương yêu (1964)
- Ngày tháng đợi chờ (1961)
- Ngày xưa lên năm lên ba (1974)
- Người anh giới tuyến (1968)
- Ơi người bạn Sài Gòn (1994)
- Sao không thấy anh về (1962)
- Sao đành bỏ quê hương (1976)
- Sầu cố đô (1963)
- Thư về em gái thành đô (1967)
- Thương về miền Trung (1962)
- Tình ca quê hương (1966)
- Trăm năm bến cũ (1967)
- Trường cũ tình xưa (1969)
- Vùng quê tương lai (1967)
- Xin anh giữ trọn tình quê (1966)
