= Vietnamese diasporic music =

Vietnamese exiled music, also called Vietnamese diasporic music, refers to the Vietnamese music brought overseas, especially to the United States and France by the forced migration of Vietnamese artists after the Fall of Saigon in 1975.

== Background ==
=== Origin ===
This branch of music was generated from the yellow music in Vietnam. Yellow music (nhạc vàng) refers to music produced in South Vietnam during the Vietnam War, named in opposition to red music (nhạc đỏ) endorsed by the socialist government of North Vietnam during the era of the Vietnamese War. Oftentimes, yellow music is also referred to as new music (tân nhạc), or sugary music (nhạc sến). These terms are reserved for songs that could be considered popular music, as opposed to ritual (like chầu văn), classical or folk music. Most yellow music has been associated with the bolero genre.

The term continues to be used by Communist officials in Vietnam to describe songs that they find too sentimental, for example, love songs, that "lead people into a state of suffering over love, the opposite of the ideal happiness that people expect to find in it." For Communist revolutionaries, the term "yellow music" has always had a pejorative meaning. However, some music sellers in Saigon, used it as a positive term, stamping "yellow music" on their tape and records to identify the sentimental music they were peddling.

==== Pre-1975 modern music in Vietnam ====
Vietnamese modern music (tân nhạc) began with the French arrival in the early 19th century. Initial French music came through the church and then the military right after their colonization of Hanoi in 1873. The new French disseminations of popular songs were made even more popular by talking movies and ballroom dancing. Young people particularly found the new style of music attractive. Primary musical activities in Hanoi before the 1930s included traditional theatre, reformed theatre, and songs by beggars who performed near train and bus stations. By the mid-1930s, Vietnamese started to compose songs in their native language using French melodies. The lyrics were usually quite different from the French versions, but it became prevailing among the people in Vietnam. Later, the Vietnamese began to write their own songs as well. It is thought that the modern Vietnamese song originated from one of these early composers, Nguyen Van Tuyen, a native student of Huế at the Philharmonic Society of Saigon, who first performed his songs there in 1937. By 1938, he was also touring in Hanoi and other cities with great reviews.

There were a number of Vietnamese composers and singers who were inspired to follow the French styles. From that on, pre-war music was developed, which is still widely listened by Vietnamese today. The form of music included marching songs, love songs as well as songs about resistance and independence from France. Generally speaking, musicians and performers in particular often held low status in Vietnamese society. Although pre-war music supposedly ended by 1946 or 1947, some songs were written as late as 1954 are still attributed to this genre. The legacy of music is that it is still heard on the stages across Vietnam and even the United States some decades later.

=== Vietnamese modern history of diaspora ===
A fair number of Vietnamese people left their homeland before the 20th century. The largest exodus came with the fall of Saigon on April 30, 1975, when 125,000 Vietnamese fled South Vietnam; by 1999, approximately 1.75 million Vietnamese resettled in Eastern and Western countries. The U.S. took 900,000 Vietnamese migrants while Canada, Australia and France accepted over 500,000. Moreover, 250,000 Vietnamese were permanently settled in China and another 100,000 left for other countries. At the end of 2000, there were approximately 2.7 million Vietnamese living in more than 100 countries and territories worldwide, including more than one million in the United States.

The global Vietnamese diasporic population numbered approximately 500,000 in 1975. This number increased to about one million in 1990 and two million in 2000. Because the Vietnamese market has been relatively small, the sales of Vietnamese overseas music were much less than the mainstream in the industry. As ethnic minorities, it is considered a success for a recording to sell 15,000 units. However, when the market was more mature, profits were counted in the millions and allowed for the employment of a large number of performers, composers and producers. By 1995, over 30 music record companies occupied the area of Westminster and Garden Grove, California known as "Little Saigon".

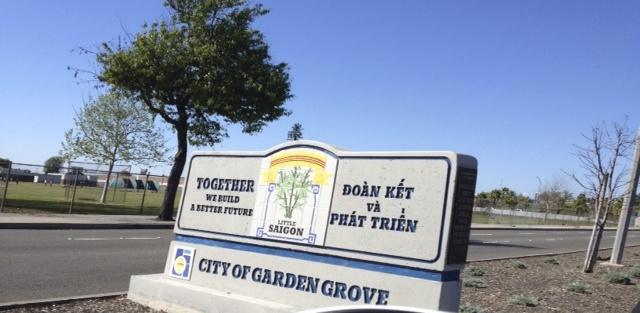
Commemorative sign marking the entrance to Little Saigon in Garden Grove, California

==== The fall of Saigon ====
The Fall of Saigon, or the Liberation of Saigon, was the capture of Saigon, the capital of South Vietnam, by the People's Army of Vietnam (PAVN) and the National Liberation Front of South Vietnam (also known as the Viet Cong) on 30 April 1975. The event marked the end of the Vietnam War and the start of a transition period to the formal reunification of Vietnam into the Socialist Republic of Vietnam.

Starting from 1975, popular music in South Vietnam, known as yellow music, was prohibited by the new socialist government, with those caught listening to it punished, and their music confiscated, due to the belief that it contained "ideas that were not good, not healthy, that required criticism."

In the circumstance, some artists in the music industry, such as Trinh Cong Son, kept staying in Vietnam, while others decided to leave, such as Pham Duy. The departure of many artists from Vietnam in May 1975 was the start point of Vietnamese exile music. Following the migration, yellow music has been modified for adapting to the foreign context. Therefore, its nature has been transformed, and it has developed towards music pertaining to the diaspora, which still retains certain characteristics inherited from its original culture, that can be discovered from the themes of music, as a means to show the attention of diasporic Vietnamese to their country of origin (See Appendix 1 and 2 for themes and links of songs).

== 20th Century: In Diaspora ==
=== Overseas Vietnamese artists ===
Among exiled Vietnamese composers, Pham Duy remained the best-known composer. His songs written before 1975 represent 90% of cassettes and CDs produced abroad. All singers have had at least one song written by Pham Duy in their repertoire. His songs, written since 1978 on the situation of exile and on life deprived of freedom in Vietnam, have received a good response. Since 1985, he has composed less but rather has written Vietnamese lyrics for western pop songs. In the year of 2000, he was allowed to return to Vietnam for one month to see his native country for the first time after 25 years of exile.

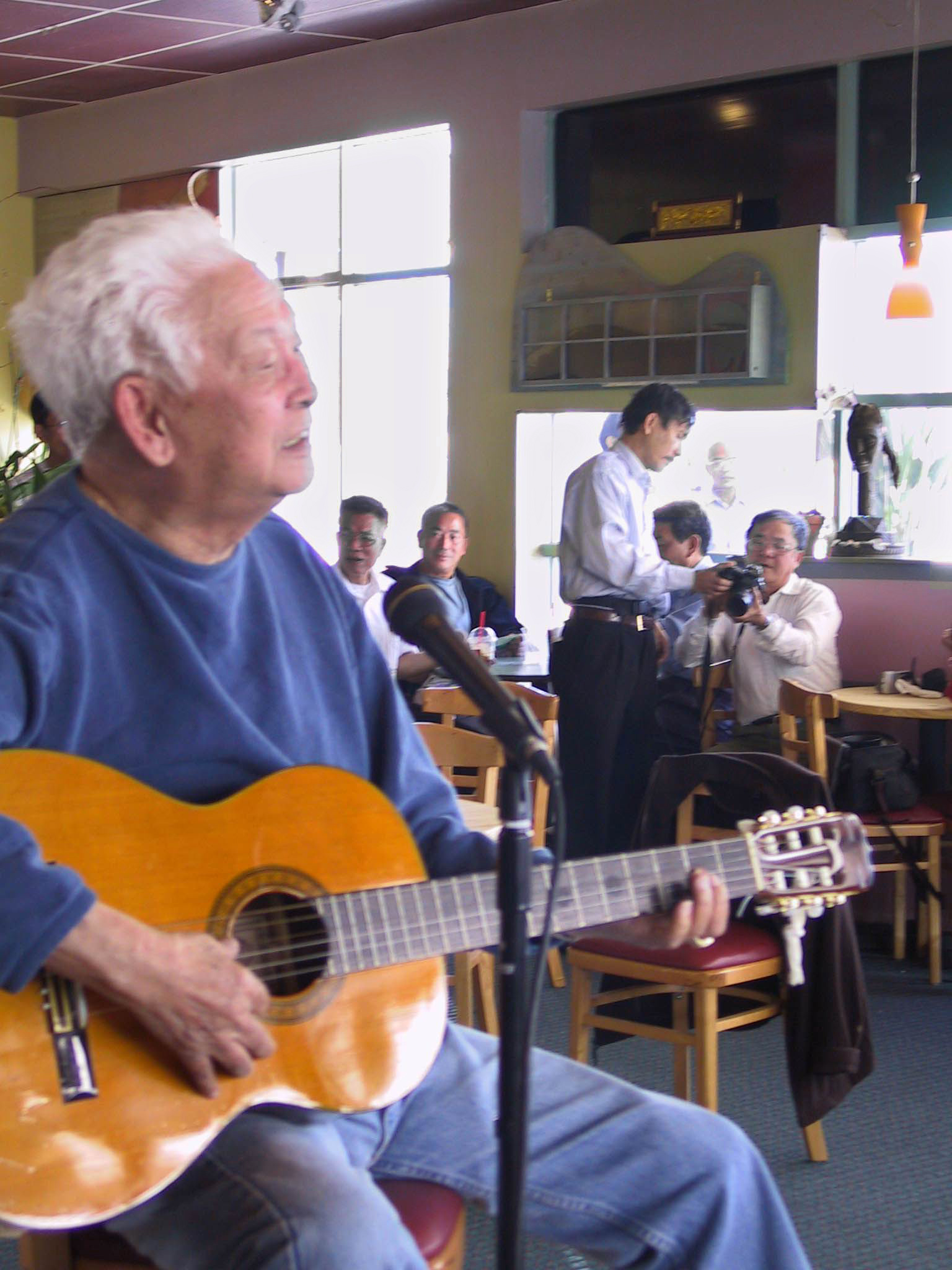
Pham Duy performing in Ho Chi Minh City

On the other hand, a new generation of young composers has been born abroad. For example, in the United States, Nguyet Anh (known only since 1980), Viet Dzung, Chau Dinh An, Phan Kien, Huynh Cong Anh, and Khuc Lan all belong to the Hung Ca movement. They have written songs on themes of struggle and resistance: Duy Quang on problems of exile; Le Uyen Phuong on boat people; Ha Thuc Sinh on penitentiary conditions in Vietnam; and Due Huy on love. Together, they have all written thousands of new songs on present problems, on their aspirations, on the resistance. Many musicians have continued to work thanks to official receptions, tours, and recordings on cassettes (until 1988), then on CDs (since 1990) and laser discs (for karaoke since 1995) and DVDs (since 1999). Pop groups known in Saigon, such as CBC, Dreamers (children of the composer Pham Duy), Up Tight (children of the musician Lu Lien), Crazy Dogs (children of the actor Viet Hung), Family Love in the United States, and Blue Jet in France continued to play abroad until 1990. New pop groups have been formed by young musicians to answer the needs of cabarets and dances held for Vietnamese in the United States, France, Canada, and Australia. Among singers known in Vietnam, Khanh Ly, who was best known for her frequent cooperation with a famous Vietnamese composer Trinh Cong Son, continued to be a Vietnamese idol of popular songs among the Vietnamese community abroad despite less publications of CDs, cassettes, and videos since 1995. She frequently gave performances, presenting on the market of music until 1995. Khanh Ly has appeared on many stages in countries where the exiled Vietnamese live. Few new compositions were included in the repertoire of singers, maybe because the old pieces encouraged the exiled Vietnamese to go through their hardship of life. Moreover, several productions houses have appeared in the United States and publish a great number of cassettes and CDs. There have been three big houses of productions, Paris By Night Thuy Nga Productions (PBN), Trung Tam Asia and Kim Loi.

Some of the early music producers in the United States owned music businesses in Viet Nam before the fall of Saigon. For example, Tung Giang who produced works by famous singers like Khanh Ha and Khanh Ly continued with his work when he arrived in the United States. He was able to record on 16 track, which was an improvement from the 4 track available in Vietnam. The early years of resettlement music served as a time of preservation since the objective at this time was to make quality copies of pre-1975 music.

During the late 1970s and early 1980s, those with experience in the music industry of Vietnam redeveloped their business in the U.S. One strategy to increase their market was merging with other small music companies. In this period, Thuy Nga Productions made their branch in France. When living in Vietnam, they had access to a studio owned by Thuy Nga. Once rooted in France, Thuy Nga's husband, Mr To Van Lai, a former professor in Vietnam, participated in the building of their first music house. With a better sense of the diasporic market, Lai created a division of Thuy Nga called Paris By Night, which produced videos of Vietnamese diasporic shows.

=== Post-1975 Vietnamese diasporic music in the United States ===
At the beginning of the 1975 migration, the generation of refugees from Vietnam was concerned about adapting to their host country, and so were musicians. However, it did not take a long time for Vietnamese music to spread throughout the newly built Vietnamese American community. Music at this time had more meaning than just entertainment that it functioned as a carrier of emotion for Vietnamese refugees to miss their motherland. Such a suddenly forced migration made most of them leave home without too many belongings. Few of them have brought cultural products. Therefore, in the early years, those with music products such as records and tapes, exchanged with others in the community to bargain for other resources; and by 1980, there were individuals who had collected a certain amount of Vietnamese music tapes. In the first decade that Vietnamese migrants had arrived in the United States, pre-1975 music was the most common type of music in the Vietnamese American community. Even more years later, the common musical themes of nostalgia, resistance and memory (See Appendix 1) conducted by Vietnamese composers continued to capture a large market. The songs that had been popular in the entertainments venues of Saigon during the Vietnamese War, were still being heard in coffee shops and nightclubs and sold in music stores.

Videos on Vietnamese songs have been somewhat successful since the end of the 1980s. Large-scaled musical shows have been processed since 1986, and some of them have been organized to raise money for helping another group of diasporic Vietnamese, "boat people", or to help local Vietnamese in distress in their home country. Thuy Nga Production's first series of music videos might represent the success. Thuy Nga's 1988 "The Giot Nuoc Mat Cho Viet Nam [A Tear for Vietnam]" song selection, which was visualized to reflect some melancholic characteristics, and typify those hot exiled music themes. With the appearance of music videos, many pre-1975 songs, as well as newly composed exiled songs, were accompanied by visuals.

Meanwhile, various forms of Western popular music and also songs made by overseas Vietnamese composers were welcomed by the diasporic population. Post-1975 exiled music was about life in former South Vietnam, which included songs about love, homesickness, freedom and anti-communism. In the early years, many cultural patriots in diaspora tended to insist on a strong anti-communist attitude; individuals who were recognized to fall out of their group would be pressured to take an anti-communist viewpoint. However, some other people in the community or music industry did not have such strong anti-communist points of view; for them, music to some extent existed beyond politics. As long as they found the music was appealing, and the artists were able to attract the audience, the music would be promoted then.

==== Western-styled influences ====
As mentioned, French music greatly influenced the style of early Vietnamese popular music. Vietnamese composers gradually developed a way to innovate popular music by combining a variety of foreign and domestic elements. For instance, the famous Vietnamese composer, Van Cao, has blended Vietnamese traditional cultures, such as folk music, legends, and popular sayings with French chansons. Other well-known composers, such as Pham Duy, sought external inspirations from the American context. Pham Duy transformed Vietnamese poetry to become lyrics, as well as recreated western melodies to be Vietnamese songs. In his songs, he also kept on depicting the living of refugees in the United States after 1975. His equivalent counterpart in Vietnam is probably Trinh Cong Son, a milestone composer in the Vietnamese music industry, who was keen on the theme of love and peace, alerting the unified Vietnam government.

Besides composers, singers maintained their numbers of loyal fans even when both of them lived outside Vietnam, such as Khanh Ly, Phuong Dung, Thanh Thuy and Le Thu; in Vietnam, Elvis Phuong, Tuan Ngoc and Due Huy sang and performed Vietnamese, French and American songs with their own rock bands. These three artists continued their successful careers after leaving Vietnam in 1975. In addition to their indigenous popular music, Vietnamese also listened to Western popular music at that time. From the 1960s to 1970s, representatives of Western pop music in the market of Vietnam included the French singer Christophe, and American rock icons such as Elvis Presley, the Beatles and Rolling Stones. American music reached the peak of its influence in South Vietnam. During the American presence, not only the production of music but also broadcast stations have been influenced by the American rock and roll music, to which young people in Saigon preferred to listen. Moreover, the city was full of bars that often played music from the U.S.

Even the Vietnamese music within the country experienced such great influences from French and American music, Vietnamese exiled music was considered to take more adoptions. Both of them have been westernized mainly in three aspects: the use of Western instruments (or remoulding traditional ones to be electric), westernized changes of musical language (including more various notes in compositions, or Western musical elements, such as Waltz), and westernized ways of performing (including more vocal layers, and Western singing techniques instead of "donot", a Vietnamese traditional vocal technique).

==== Musical life in the United States ====
There is a transitional period in the early musical life of diasporic Vietnamese. In the beginning, "... most of the old artists who left Vietnam were still trying to resettle in their new homes, so they had little time to produce any new music. In the U.S, there is more stress. [As an artist] You only work only 2-3 days a week. You work as a technician or something else [to supplement your income]"; after the period of hardship, "even musicians starting out were able to have an affordable mini-studio in their own home. They can lay tracks and create music at their leisure."

In regard to Vietnamese music productions in the diaspora, Vietnamese Americans were playing a leading role in the domain. Their music industry, by living in one of the most wealthy and technologically advanced countries in the world, has been developed to adopt the best producing technology. Able to liberally learn and experiment in the techniques of arranging, they have been years ahead of their Vietnamese counterparts, since Vietnam's music industry has very limited access to such equipment and training. However, the spending on producing music was quite large, especially in the United States. For this reason, many Vietnamese Americans chose to produce their music or videos in Vietnam.

Vietnamese diasporic music has penetrated into different markets. Led by enthusiastic individuals with the assistance of technological advances, members of the overseas Vietnamese population have successfully promoted their music to the world. Diasporic music as a special mixture of emotions has appealed not only the exiled Vietnamese but also residents in Vietnam. Diasporic music got a large number of fans in the homeland in spite of the fact that overseas music has been restricted especially in the public by the unified Vietnam government since 1975. With the eventual loosening of restrictions on music production, most notably since 1996, Vietnam has been emerging to create its own popular music centre.

==== "Culture in a bubble" ====
Things connected to the pre-1975 period were seen as an essential piece of cultural memory. Even some diasporic songs composed after 1975 inherited the pre-1975 standards. This static nature has allowed some to consider Vietnamese music production as "culture in a bubble". For the younger Vietnamese generations, those who were mainly raised or born overseas, listening to melancholy music is even less appealing. They, like other young people, have been attracted to popular music heard in the mainstream or at least those in the Vietnamese American music scene.

Considering the current nature of Vietnamese diasporic music, the old generation in diaspora worried about its future and the trend of being assimilated. Some predict that Vietnamese diasporic music will die within one or two generations as the young forget the language and culture of Vietnam. Others feel that as long as diasporic Vietnamese are seen as the "other" in their host countries, they will find their way back to Vietnamese culture, and music is one road to take. The sad thing is that: "our children and grandchildren will be as good as the American musicians. But they will not be interested in writing for the Vietnamese American audience because the market is too small. The hope lies in Vietnam's [artists], but they are not creating either".

For people living in Vietnam, they can catch up with all the changes in the music of this country; but for people living abroad, they only remember the music of the period when they left. Anti-communist pressures also prevent individuals from creating pieces in freedom. These factors threaten the future of Vietnamese diasporic music, or cause to the burst of the "cultural bubble."

== 20th Century: In Vietnam ==
=== Post-1975 restrictions and resistances in Vietnam ===
The new leadership banned songs that were popular in South Vietnam after the war. Though exerting heavy control, the government could not monitor all its citizens. Vietnamese inhabitants had access to music that heard in the Vietnamese communities abroad in the late 1970s and early 1980s. The ban on exiled music and yellow music was more strictly supervised in the South, while people in the North accessed to them relatively more easily. Paris By Night products were extremely popular and were enjoyed at very low volumes, at homes or covertly in some karaoke bars. In Hanoi, people would go to small video shops in the corners of town to look for PBN videos. From the late 1970s on, residents in Saigon who were captivated by Vietnamese diasporic music, had their relatives to send music recordings back to Vietnam. By the late 1980s and early 1990s, Vietnamese citizens had already acquired pirated PBN videos, other tapes and CDs from the overseas Vietnamese community in the black market. They were able to follow the consumer trends in this way, including illegal music acquisitions. Although the government attempted to stop black market trading and purchases of foreign products in dark through nation-wide campaigns, people still watched them openly in 1993. The period from 1980 to 1990 was when Vietnamese exiled music had the greatest reception among the domestic audience. A very large portion of the population in the country was listening to music produced by Vietnamese in the diaspora. With the help of the Committee for Overseas Vietnamese, several diasporic singers were allowed to perform regularly in Vietnam, and even be billed side by side with Vietnamese singers.

Against prohibition, people in North Vietnam also enjoyed Vietnamese diasporic music. The interesting thing is that the Northerners listened to the type of music even more than the Southerners because of its novelty to them; this way of singing is more expressive, soft, and sentimental than that of which they were trained traditionally. However, the favour of the music declined with the growing popularity of local substitutes. In the late 1990s, CDs made in Vietnam, such as My Linh and Toe Ngan, hit its domestic market as well as the overseas by storm. The music from this moment reaches Vietnamese living outside of Vietnam, signalling the phenomenon of "Vietnam's music invasion." Interestingly, more diasporic Vietnamese singers were brave enough to return to their adoring fans in Vietnam, bearing being labelled as a communist by the overseas community.

==== Doi Moi: anti-"social evils" campaigns ====
Doi Moi is the name given to the economic reforms initiated in Vietnamese in 1986 with the goal of creating a "socialist-oriented market economy". Some expected the nature of reforms might bring a more relaxing atmosphere for the general Vietnamese population to welcome Western and diasporic music. However, the Vietnamese government carried out a set of crackdowns on the circulation of the products. One example is the anti-"social evils" campaigns that were set up to stop western and diasporic influences in Vietnam. Such "social evils" include drug abuse, prostitution, gambling, drinking, decadent culture and having Western consumer values.

In 1996, in the months before the National Assembly meetings that take place every five years, Hanoi experienced the anti-"social evils" campaign. Foreign lettering on billboards were covered up; the major Coca-Cola helium blow-up outside of Hanoi was also shrouded; music and video shops were raided, and foreign-made products confiscated. Local bars and dance clubs were raided as well. Riot police rushed into an expatriate bar pushing everyone out onto the street well before the establishment was to close down for the evening. Similarly, reports show that officers raided bars and arrested suspected sex workers and fining bar owners in Saigon. In the same year, music and video stores ran their business in the margin. In 1997, police in Ho Chi Minh City claimed they burned 15 tons of banned compact discs, videos, magazines and other items "in a show of resolve to purge Vietnam of what the government calls culturally impure items." Contraband materials consisted mostly of pornographic, violent or anti-communist materials (AP-Dow Jones News Service, 1997). In 2000, there were more nation-wide campaigns of cultural censorship and control. Inspectors seized 120,194 tapes, 84,054 CDs, 30 tons of printed matter, 690 video recorders and 16 gambling machines, as well as deleting 23,000 square meters of "illegal advertisement hoarding." Foreigners had to behave carefully if they wanted to continue living and working in Vietnam, while locals had to be extremely careful, or they could lose their livelihood or face imprisonment.

In the United States, the country also applied censorship to the mainstream, and even many ethnic groups had their own censorship within their communities. In terms of music, no production house was safe from anti-communist scrutiny. Even the most popular Paris By Night suffered from Vietnamese American censorship. In 1997, video "Ca Dao Me" [Mother's Folk Song], number 40 in the PBN series, was released. Though it was another highly expected PBN video, the content was soon proved to be too controversial for anti-communist groups within the Vietnamese American community. The controversy involved clips of the South Vietnamese military helicopter in battle followed by cuts of Vietnamese families running from burning villages. Anti-communist groups such as The Front claimed this depicted the South Vietnamese military as perpetrators of pain and suffering. They carried out a full campaign to demand an apology and a recall of all 40 PBN videos. Due to the pressures, PBN wrote a public apology and re-edited the offensive sections of its video for trade.

Control of music production extended to control Vietnamese diasporic artists' livelihood. Due to the pressure faced in the United States, and the improved working condition in Vietnam, a handful of Vietnamese diasporic artists chose to perform in Vietnam, suffering serious criticism from the anti-communist groups in the United States. One of the first group to return to Vietnam was Elvis Phuong in 1996. Though they encountered criticism from the community, it was a trend that more diasporic artists decided to visit or work in Vietnam every year. Some have also decided to make Vietnam their home or at least for about half of the year. Another incentive to overlook the criticism is the fan base in Vietnam. At that time, these singers were still a novelty and were known to the general population through various pirated CDs and videos. As long as artists can move beyond harassment tactics such as threatening phone calls, slanderous statements and boycotts of their products, they were relatively free to work in Vietnam.

On the 25th anniversary marking the fall of Saigon, hundreds of Vietnamese Americans gathered to crush Vietnamese-made compact discs and videotapes as people cheered them on. This action is taken one step further when Vietnamese artists come to perform in the United States. No matter their fan base abroad, shows met with fierce protest in every city they were held: Boston in Massachusetts, Atlantic City in New Jersey, Fall Church in Virginia, and San Jose in California. In some cities, the protestors were even much more than the fans attended. It was not until 2000, at the peak of the "Vietnam music invasion", that Vietnamese singers began to have the courage to perform publicly in the United States.

Two decades after the renovation of 1986, when Vietnam's economy began to adopt structural-adjustment policies from the International Monetary Fund, many of the yellow and diasporic music pieces gradually resurfaced again. Songs that once unlawfully corrupted the moral fabric of Vietnamese society even have shifted to be forms of cultural pedagogy used to teach the consumer of mass media about the values of being honest hardworking citizens.

== 21st Century ==
=== New Vietnamese music in the diasporic market ===
On the opposite side of protesting, much other Vietnamese living in the diaspora were enjoying the new sounds from Vietnam. After 2000, in the largest Vietnamese American shopping area in Orange County, Vietnam CDs blended well with the diasporic productions except for its competitively cheap prices. They were sold at about $2 compared to the price of $8-$12 for those produced by diasporic Vietnamese.

The music from Vietnam was not just heard behind closed doors in the Vietnamese American community; it appeared in the most unlikely of places. In 1999, the music of one of the most famous Vietnamese singers, Thanh Lam, played loudly at music stores in San Jose's Lion Plaza commercial centre in the heart of the Vietnamese American community in the Bay Area. At a 2000 Vietnamese American humanitarian fundraiser in San Jose, nearly half of the songs played came from post-1975 Vietnamese composers, yet no one as much as flinched in the audience.

In 2001, Vietnamese American and Vietnamese music products, such as CDs, videos and karaoke discs, were placed next to each other without any barrier. This gradual takeover of the diasporic market by Vietnamese music from Vietnam has been a fascinating phenomenon to observe. Others believe that the growing Vietnamese music industry had in part to do with the lack of creativity by diasporic Vietnamese artists and poor management by overseas producers which resulted in low-quality their music.

For the first time since 1975, Vietnamese diasporic music has started to show its weakness in commercial competition in Vietnam or in the diaspora. In a survey conducted by the L.A. Times in 2000, among more than 25 Vietnamese American music stores, it showed that discounts of Vietnamese diasporic music increased from 30% to 70%, not being sold as well as its Vietnamese competitors.

=== Musical life in Vietnam after Doi Moi ===
Since the Doi Moi economic reformation began in 1986, an increasing number of foreign tourists have visited Vietnam, constructing a new dimension to the musical life of the country. Many hotels and restaurants have hired musicians who played traditional Vietnamese music to entertain their new customers. Spectacles of musical performances present tourists with some aspects of the musical culture of Vietnam, though musicians also play westernized folk music to cater to foreigners' tastes because of economic necessity. Many groups of traditional music artists like Tre Xanh, Phu Dong, have been sent abroad to participate in cultural festivals or to conduct concerts to the exiled Vietnamese. Though within the country, the emphasis has leaned more on Vietnamese popular music, as young singers turning toward the West. Costumes they dressed on stages are more similar to that of Western pop singers, and songs they sang are those fashionable and prevailing in foreign countries (Western, Korean, Japanese, and Taiwanese). Since 1995, many Vietnamese singers have become famous in the country, and have been embracing the global market. They were able to earn approximately 20,000 US Dollars per month with shows and recordings. Some years later, more artists of folk theatre and pop singers living in Vietnam have got the opportunities to perform abroad at international music festivals or in America, Asia, Australia and Europe where Vietnamese migrants had settled in. A great number of Vietnamese oversea artists like Huong Lan, Phuong Mai, Elvis Phuong, Hoai Linh, Dalena, etc., have been back to Vietnam more frequently to perform with other Vietnamese local artists. Such a musical exchange has facilitated the buildup of the relationship between Vietnamese artists and those outside the country.

The cultural industry in Vietnam shows movement toward growth. Musical festivals have taken place, including the Lullaby Festival, modernized Theater Festival, Theater Song contest, and the Traditional Theater Festival. Film music has been composed for the film industry in Vietnam. Furthermore, the Institute of Musicology plays a role in the preservation and research of Vietnamese music. The institute uses technology to restore and preserve Vietnamese music and songs on compact discs for the conservation of sound documents. Stored in the Sound Archives of the Institute of Musicology are 8,850 pieces of instrumental music and nearly 18,000 folk songs performed by approximately 2,000 performers. Technology products in the form of audio CDs, video CDs, and videotapes featuring performances of folk music have been released.

== Appendixes ==
=== Appendix 1: Common themes of Vietnamese exiled music ===
1. Nostalgia for the country, nostalgia for Saigon (1975-1977) with songs evoking lost memories, such as "Vinh Biet Saigon" (Farewell Saigon) by Nam Loc (1976) and "Saigon niem nho khong ten" (Saigon, Nostalgia without Name) by Nguyen Dinh Toan (1977).
2. Resistance and struggle for the re-conquest of the country (1978-1981) in songs composed by Pham Duy ("Hat tren duong tam dung" / Songs on the Road of Exile, 1978), songs of struggle by Nguyet Anh (" Em nho mau co" / Remember the Colors of the Flag, 1981); ("Duoi co phuc quoc" / Under the Flag of the Re-conquest of the Country, 1981), and songs by Viet Dzung ("Luu Vong Quoc" / Melodies of the Exile, 1980; "Kinh ty nan" / Prayers of Refugees, 1981), etc.
3. Description of prisoners' lives in Vietnam, found in a compilation of 20 songs by Pham Duy based on poems written by Nguyen Chi Thien ("Nguc Ca" / Songs of Jail, 1981) and melodies by the poet-musician Ha Thuc Sinh ("Tieng Hat tui nhu" / The Song of Shame, 1982), etc.
4. Rebirth of prewar songs (1982-1985), with thousands of cassettes recording voices of male singers (Elvis Phuong, Duy Quang, Che Linh) and female singers (Khanh Ly, Le Thu, Thanh Thuy, Thanh Tuyen, Huong Lan, Julie Quang) well known to the Vietnamese; these revive memories of the golden age of Saigon.
5. Birth of the Hung Ca movement (since 1985) gathered around ten young composers, including Ha Thuc Sinh, Nguyen Huu Nghia, Nguyet Anh, Viet Dzung, Phan Ni Tan, and Khuc Lan. They have composed new songs on different themes: struggle, resistance, and love, and this movement work to collect and preserve some new songs.
6. Development of "new wave" music from Eurodisco and of Chinese serials music (since 1986), with about one hundred cassettes on these kinds of music ("top hit" western songs and music of Hong Kong and Taiwan movies with Vietnamese lyrics).
7. Diffusion of songs composed in Vietnam among Vietnamese communities overseas (since 1997). This new Vietnamese pop music has been developed in Vietnam, and many of its artists have become well known abroad. The overseas Vietnamese are interested in the newly composed songs and the young artists of Vietnam because they like to listen to another musical source and to discover new artistic faces. Vietnamese refugees are allowed to go back to Vietnam on vacation, where they discover new songs and new artists. This contact permits the export of music to foreign countries where the Vietnamese diaspora now lives.

=== Appendix 2: Links of songs mentioned in Appendix 1 (partially) ===
- "Vinh Biet Saigon" / Farewell Saigon; by Nam Loc, 1976
- "Saigon niem nho khong ten" / Saigon, Nostalgia without Name; by Nguyen Dinh Toan, 1977
- "Hat tren duong tam dung" / Songs on the Road of Exile; by Pham Duy, 1978
- "Em nho mau co"/ Remember the Colors of the Flag; by Nguyet Anh, 1981
- "Luu Vong Quoc" / Melodies of the Exile; by Viet Dzung, 1980
- "Kinh ty nan" / Prayers of Refugees; by Viet Dzung, 1981
- "Nguc Ca" / Songs of Jail; by Pham Duy, 1981

=== Appendix 3: Significant time nodes in the development of Vietnamese exiled music ===
- Pre-1975: The development of yellow music, whose characteristics were inherited by the exiled music
- 1975: The start point of Vietnamese exiled music due to the forced migration in 1975
- Post-1975: The exiled music was developed in resettled countries, although encountered restrictions or limitations in both home and host countries
- 1986: Doi moi, economic reformation in Vietnam, renewing the social context for Vietnamese music
- 1996: Loosening of restrictions on Vietnamese exiled music in Vietnam
- 2000: Some diasporic Vietnamese artists were allowed to return to Vietnam
- 2005: Basically most of those banned songs, including yellow music and exiled music were allowed to be released to the public

== Recommended Readings ==
- Cannon, A. M. (2012). Virtually audible in diaspora: The transnational negotiation of Vietnamese traditional music. Journal of Vietnamese Studies, 7(3), 122–156.
- Dao, T. T. (1984). Renascence of Vietnamese music. In Essays on Vietnamese Music (96-168). Hanoi: Foreign Languages Pub. House.
- Dorais L. (2010). Politics, kinship, and ancestors: Some diaspora dimensions of the Vietnamese experience in North America. Journal of Vietnamese Studies, 5(2), 91–132.
- Gibbs, J. (2008). How does Hanoi rock? The way to rock and roll in Vietnam. Asian Music, 39(1), 5-25.
- Nguyen, J. R. (2013). Staging Vietnamese America: Music and the performance of Vietnamese American identities. ProQuest Dissertations Publishing, 1–137.
- Norton, B. (2009). Songs for the spirits: Music and mediums in modern Vietnam. Chicago: University of Illinois Press.
- Norton, B. (2013). Vietnamese popular song in '1968': War, protest and sentimentalism. In Music and protest in 1968. Cambridge: Cambridge University Press.
- Pham, N. (16 June 2010). Risking life for pop music in wartime Vietnam. BBC News. Retrieved from Risking life for pop music in wartime Vietnam
- Reyes, A. (1999). Songs of the caged, songs of the free. Philadelphia: Temple University.
- Schafer, J. C. (2007). Death, Buddhism, and existentialism in the songs of Tring Cong Son. University of California Press, 2(1), 144–186.
- Schafer, J. C. (2007). The Trinh Cong Son phenomenon. The Journal of Asian Studies, 66(3), 597–643.
- Schafer, J. C. (2012). The curious memoirs of the Vietnamese composer Pham Duy. Cambridge University Press, 43(1), 77–110.
- Taylor, P. (2001). Fragments of the present: Searching for modernity in Vietnam's South. Crows Nest, Australia: Allen & Unwin.
