= V-pop =

Music genre

- Stylistic origins: Traditional Vietnamese; rhythm and blues; hip hop; EDM; rock; pop; ballads
- Cultural origins: Inspired by pop music in Vietnam (1980s–present) South Vietnam (1950s-1970s)
- Typical instruments: Vocals; drum kit; drum machine; flute; Đàn tranh; guitar; bass; keyboards; violin; saxophone; percussion

V-pop is an abbreviation for Vietnamese popular music (Vietnamese: nhạc pop Việt Nam, nhạc trẻ Việt Nam, or nhạc đại chúng Việt Nam), a musical genre covering modern Vietnamese pop music.

== Etymology ==
During the early 1970s, the youth music of Saigon, known as nhạc trẻ Sài Gòn or kích động nhạc ("exciting music"), was popular. After 1975, this musical scene was outlawed. In the 1990s, Vietnam's Ministry of Culture, Sports and Tourism promoted the term nhạc xanh (literally "green music") as part of an effort to steer audiences away from nhạc vàng ("yellow music"), the sentimental South Vietnamese pop that remained politically sensitive after reunification. Also in the 1990s, the phrase nhạc nhẹ (soft music) appeared when Vietnam was opening up to the world. Nhạc trẻ (youth music) was used in the early 2000s. The phrase V-pop was created by artists from the North, including Hanoi.

== History ==
=== Domestic ===
==== Origins ====
The third period of the foundation of Vietnamese music, started from the 19th century to the beginning of World War II. The Court imposed some new rulings on music which brought along the creation of a lot of new music and theater. With these rulings, Vietnam was able to develop an original and unique music that it could finally call its own, and which forms most of today's musical genres and styles. At the beginning of the 20th century, a new theater was created, called "new music of Vietnam" (also known as the Western-influenced popular music of Vietnam). A few Western instruments made their way into use: mandolin, Spanish guitar and violin, and music such as ballads and pop began to become popular.

The fourth period started around 1945 and continues to the present day. The Vietnamese popular music movement developed strongly during this period. There are many well-known musicians including Phạm Duy, Văn Cao, Lam Phương and Nguyễn Văn Tuyên. Some of the most famous singers of the era include Phượng Hoàng, Elvis Phương, Chế Linh, Khánh Ly, Giáng Thu, Thanh Lan and Carol Kim. Popular for their modern style, Mai Lệ Huyền and Hùng Cường are considered to be more "exciting" or "energetic" contributors to V-pop.

On 30 April 1975, Saigon fell, and as a result, the Vietnam War ended and some South Vietnamese citizens evacuated to other countries. Popular music released up to that day (dubbed "yellow music") was then prohibited - specifically after 2 July 1976 - due to its sentimental and sympathetic nature. Music that was patriotic and followed a traditional revolutionary theme (dubbed "red music"), as well as folk songs, had "good values", and were encouraged by the then-newly re-unified Communist Vietnam. However, Vietnamese classics (dubbed "Nhạc trẻ") continued to survive in overseas Vietnamese communities, where it remained even after being reintroduced back to Vietnam in 1986.

In 1986, after the Đổi Mới reforms, Vietnamese pop music made a gradual recovery. The music at that time, mainly produced by Trịnh Công Sơn, continued the traditional "love and war" theme.

==== 1990s and 2000s ====
In the 1990s of the 20th century, V-pop returned to a more steady path compared to its tumultuous period during and prior to the Vietnam War. In 1997, the Làn Sóng Xanh ("Wave of Green") Awards were founded to push the development of the music industry. Singer Lam Trường produced "Tình Thôi Xót Xa" in 1998 and was popular amongst the young people of Ho Chi Minh City, which marked a strong beginning for Vietnam's domestic music market.

At the beginning of the 21st century, popular artists (such as Hồng Nhung, Thu Phương, Hồ Quỳnh Hương, Mỹ Tâm, Mỹ Linh, Thanh Lam, Phương Thanh, Đan Trường, Thanh Thảo) emerged, creating musical hits that were characteristically light, vibrant, and youthful. Singers such as Bảo Thy, Khởi My, Tóc Tiên, Hương Tràm, Soobin Hoàng Sơn, Son Tung M-TP, and Noo Phước Thịnh further popularised R&B tunes.

Numerous artists, such as Bằng Kiều, Hồ Quỳnh Hương, Mỹ Linh, Hồng Nhung, Phương Thanh, Mỹ Tâm, and Đan Trường emerged from Vietnam and started to produce songs of the EDM, pop, R&B and rap genres, among other genres. During this period of cultural expansion, a number of foreign artists had worked with the emerging industry (4Men, Super Junior, Lee Young Ah). Also emerging were a large number of modern music acts such as Anh Khang, Tạ Quang Thắng, Bảo Thy, Đông Nhi, Noo Phước Thịnh, and Quang Vinh, all of whom were associated with the R&B genre.

The Asia Song Festival (festival of Asian music) created many opportunities for cultural exchange between countries. Artists representing Vietnam included Mỹ Tâm (2003), Mỹ Linh (2004), Hồ Quỳnh Hương (2006 & 2008), Lam Trường (2007) and Hồ Ngọc Hà (2009). Many of these Vietnamese artists hoped to fortify the entertainment industry by engaging in festivals, shows etc. in other countries.

==== 2010s and 2020s ====
During this period, a new wave of young artists, such as MIN, Amee, Erik, and Sơn Tùng M-TP (considered a "king of V-pop"), emerged and replaced most of the previous generation of artists in attracting fans. Underground artists had a great influence on the development of V-pop during this period; many of these have a connection to the underground and Viet rap or even come from there. In 2018, SGO48, a Vietnamese sister group of Japanese group AKB48, was formed but has had mixed success since debuting.

=== Overseas ===
After the fall of Saigon, some artists emigrated. A growing demand for music until 30 April 1975 led to a re-emergence of the popularity of these previously available songs, which were no longer widely available in Vietnam.

In the early 1980s, the number of foreign record companies specializing in Vietnamese music began to grow. Thúy Nga Centre, Van Son Entertainment, and Asia Entertainment were all companies that have produced many popular Vietnamese songs, as well as entertainment concert series like Paris by Night, the Van Son Show, Asia, and multiple others.

During the 1990s, more young artists began to appear overseas in the international market. These included Lâm Nhật Tiến, Trish Thuy Trang, Tuấn Ngọc, Bằng Kiều, and Minh Tuyết. EDM was also incorporated into Vietnamese songs, which was a departure from melodic ballads that Vietnamese audiences were more accustomed to. Nevertheless, boléro, ballads, R&B, rock etc. still remain popular.

Currently, YouTube and TikTok are the main video-sharing platforms. Many songs have started to trend on YouTube and TikTok around the world in the 2020s. However, sad, melodic ballad songs, such as historical war songs, war movie soundtracks, pre-1975 South Vietnamese pop songs, or musical shows such as Paris by Night, are also still popular amongst Vietnamese people overseas.

== Internationally ==
At the end of 2005, singer Mỹ Tâm released the album Void. In mid-September 2007, Mỹ Linh re-released her three old albums for domestic and international markets, including Made in Vietnam (2003), Chat with Mozart (2005) and Let Love Sing (2006) with the help of Pony Canyon Records (Japan). Made in Vietnam was renamed Radio-I in Japan and was awarded the best album of the month in Nagoya, Aichi City. At the end of 2006, My Tam made her fifth album, Soaring, in Korea and released her album in collaboration with Nurimaru Pictures. Her ninth studio album, Tâm 9, became the first album by a Vietnamese artist to enter the Billboard World Album charts at No. 10.

In recent years, V-pop has started to attract more attention internationally from young singers with innovative new music styles such as Pháo, Trúc Nhân, Min, Amee, Hoàng Thùy Linh, and MONSTAR. Many songs and albums from the V-pop genre have entered numerous prestigious international music charts. V-pop gradually became a leader in the Southeast Asian music industry.

Currently, the most viewed music video that can arguably be classified as V-pop is a song called "Bong Bong Bang Bang" (365daband), reaching more than 600 million views.

In 2019, Son Tung M-TP collaborated with the rapper Snoop Dogg to release the song "Give It to Me". The Source called him an "Asian sensation" and World Music Awards dubbed him a "king of V-pop". Korea's Star News also posted the article and called him a leading voice within the V-pop music industry. In 2020, Tung entered the Billboard Social 50 chart at No. 28, becoming the first Vietnamese artist to enter the chart. In 2020, the song "Give It to Me" featuring Snoop Dogg entered the Billboard LyricFind Global chart at No. 1. In 2021, the song "Chúng ta của hiện tại" also entered the Billboard LyricFind Global chart at No. 1 and the song "Muộn rồi mà sao còn" entered the Billboard Global Excl. U.S. chart at number 126. Tung continued to appear on the Global Excl. U.S. chart on June 18, 2024 at number 162 with the song "Đừng làm trái tim anh đau".

In 2020, during the COVID-19 pandemic, Min and Erik released a song called "Ghen Cô Vy" ("Jealous Coronavirus") to encourage people on how to handle the pandemic. The song became popular for its catchy tune and for raising awareness about limiting the spread of COVID-19.

In 2025, V-pop song "Phù Đổng Thiên Vương" by Đức Phúc won Intervision 2025, an international song competition organised in Russia featuring acts representing 22 countries, thanks to which Phúc gained popularity both domestically and abroad.

== See also ==
- Yellow music
- Red music
- Popular music of Vietnam
- Ca trù
- Quan họ
- Nhã nhạc
- Nhạc tài tử
- Traditional Vietnamese dance
- Traditional Vietnamese musical instruments
- Vietnamese theatre
