= Mùa xuân đầu tiên =

1976 song by Văn Cao

Single by Thanh Thúy, Ánh Tuyết, Hồng Nhung, Đức Tuấn
- Released: 1976
- Songwriter: Văn Cao

"Mùa xuân đầu tiên" (lit. "The first Spring") is a song composed by Văn Cao in 1976. This was his first composition after a two decade-long hiatus since the mid-1950s, and is generally considered to be his last great work; however, it was only 12 years after completion that it became well known to the public.

It is a reflection of his own feelings in regards to the fall of Saigon, demonstrating his joy at Vietnam finally achieving full independence, and closing out an era of destructive and debilitating wars, as shown in his "Tiến quân ca", the national anthem of Vietnam. He said to his children that he wrote the song to display his happiness in "the country and the people reuniting at last."

== Background ==
Văn Cao was commissioned by Sài Gòn Giải Phóng to write a song celebrating the reunification of Vietnam. The resulting work, "Mùa xuân đầu tiên", was published in the Spring 1976 issue of the paper. There were opinions that the song was "ambiguous, calling for generic peace and love, lacking in class", "weak and puny", and was considered "out of step" with other patriotic songs, which were characterised by their "fervour, forcefulness, and uplifting lyrics, brimming with determination to triumph." Despite this, Vietnamese-language radios in Moscow still allowed the song to be aired, letting it remain in the public's mind. Văn Thao, Văn Cao's son, revealed that "somehow, someway, in 1976, the song was printed in Russia, and the Soviet Union paid my father 100 roubles; he had to authorise my sister, who was studying there, to take the money on his behalf via the embassy." Văn Cao told his daughter to keep the money, saying that he "never knew what royalties were back home anyways."

== Reception ==
=== Initial difficulties ===
In 1985, authorities of Nghĩa Bình province invited Văn Cao, Nguyễn Trọng Tạo and Nguyễn Thụy Kha to tour the province and compose. Each person made a postcard, involving a self-portrait, a poem, and a song. On Văn Cao's part, he submitted his self-portrait, a newly written poem about Quy Nhơn, and the song "Mùa xuân đầu tiên" that had remained in his closet for quite some time.

1988 proved to be an excellent year for him, as his friends, including Hữu Loan, Hoàng Cầm, Trần Dần, Lê Đạt, and Phùng Quán, got their memberships in the Vietnam Writers' Association restored. As to himself, he had a run of sixty shows of his music, from spring to autumn. Around this time, the New Works Publishing House printed his poem collection Leaf, and the Youth Publishing House printed his collection of selected works, in which the song was included.

=== Wider reception ===
In 1991, when Nguyễn Ngọc Hà, on behalf of the Association of Vietnamese Patriots in France, commissioned Kha to produce a film on the life of Văn Cao, he included a long excerpt of "Mùa xuân đầu tiên". For the first time, the song was recorded by Quốc Đông, with organist Hoàng Lương accompanying.

In 1993, the Literature Publishing House printed the Collection of Poems of Văn Cao to celebrate his 70th birthday. That same year, a concert dedicated to his music was held at the Youth Cultural Space on Tăng Bạt Hổ Street, Hanoi. In the programme, singer Minh Hoa performed the song; it marked the first time that the song had been debuted on stage, even if it was for a simple communal concert.

It took nearly 20 years after the song's completion to finally receive widespread public attention, after Văn Cao has already died. In 1995, on the occasion of 49 days after his death, in Da Nang, a national concert held in his honour featured singers from a military school; there, the song was sung by a female choir. In the same year, director Đinh Anh Dũng produced the film Văn Cao - A Morning Rooted in Truth, in which the song was presented by 17-year-old Thanh Thúy. The song has remained in the public's mind ever since.

The song has since been renditioned by multiple artists, the most successful of those being Thanh Thúy, and Lâm Bảo Ngọc, whose videos on YouTube have gathered nearly 15 million and half a million views, respectively.
