= Trường ca =

Genre of Vietnamese song

The trường ca "long song", is a lyrical genre of Vietnamese song and poetry. The term trường ca in Vietnamese applies both to poetry - including the European epos, or Epic poem (vi:trường ca), but secondly also to a specific Vietnamese song genre (vi:Trường ca (âm nhạc)) which is a development of both European and traditional Vietnamese models. Notable exponents of the song genre include the three masters of the 1960s and 1970s, Văn Cao, Phạm Duy and Trịnh Công Sơn who wrote long lyrics with the intention not of poems to be read, but to be sung. An example of French references is found in Trịnh Công Sơn's trường ca, using the image of a tireless sand crab, which draws on Camus' The Myth of Sisyphus to make a Vietnamese lament-ballad.

== Examples ==
- Sông Lô by Văn Cao (1947)
- Ba Đình nắng by Bùi Công Kỳ (1947)
- Bình ca by Nguyễn Đình Phúc (1947)
- Con đường cái quan by Phạm Duy (1954)
- Du kích sông Thao by Đỗ Nhuận (thập niên 1950)
- Đóa hoa vô thường by Trịnh Công Sơn
- Hội trùng dương by Phạm Đình Chương
- Hòn vọng phu by Lê Thương (1947)
- Mẹ Việt Nam by Phạm Duy (1960)
- Người Hà Nội by Nguyễn Đình Thi (1947)
- Hàn Mặc Tử by Phạm Duy
- Minh họa Kiều by Phạm Duy
- Người Việt Nam by Trương Quý Hải.
