= Trường ca Sông Lô =

Trường ca Sông Lô (translation: Epic of the Lô River) is a famous song of the Vietnamese musician Văn Cao. It was written after the decisive Viet Minh victory on the Lô river at Đoan Hùng.

== Background ==
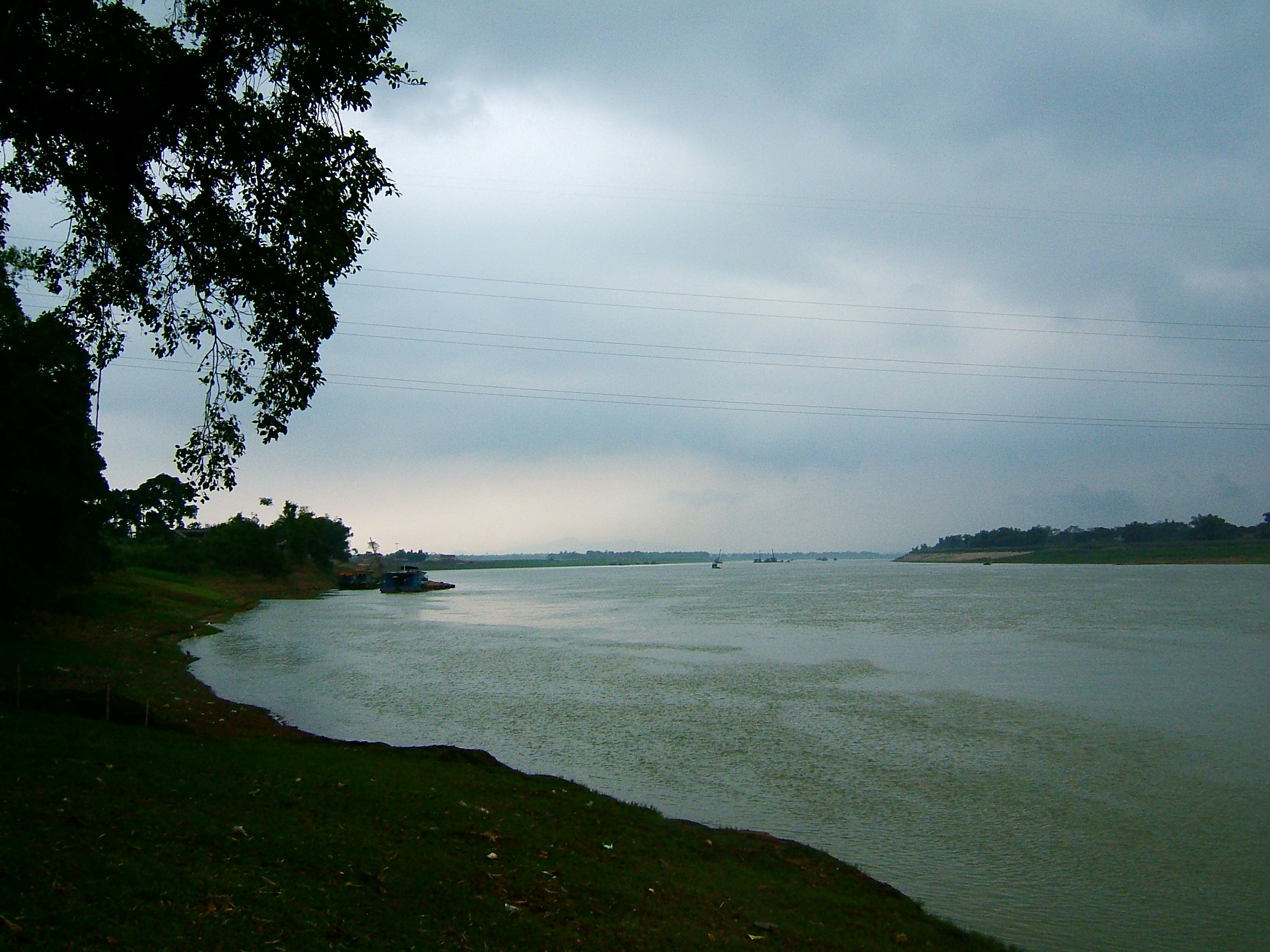
Lô River at Phú Thọ

In October 1947, Văn Cao went to Việt Bắc for taking part in the resistance war against the French army. In order to reach Việt Bắc, Văn Cao arrived at Phú Thọ, and then walked along the river Lô to the place of the Viet Minh headquarter. During this time, the French carried out Operation Léa to attack the Viet Minh's headquarter, and Lô River was also a place of fierce fighting. But finally, on 24 October 1947, the Viet Minh force gained a decisive victory at the place Đoan Hùng on Lô River, destroy 2 French war-boats and inflicted heavy damages on another two, killed hundred of French troopers. This decisive battle forced the French to withdraw and greatly contributed to the failure of Operation Léa. During the retreat, the French troops raided, burned, destroy a lot of Vietnamese villages along the river banks.

The musician Văn Cao appeared at the battlefield right after the battle had ended, therefore he managed to witness the burning and destroyed villages, the corpse of killed Frenchs in the river, and the victorious Vietnamese people who were rebuilding the devastated home after the great victory. After that, when arriving at the Viet Minh head base, Văn Cao met Doãn Tuế, an artillery officer who participated in the victory on Lô River and heard everything about this battle from Tuế. All of these events became the material for Văn Cao to compose a great epic song about this decisive victory.

After a short while, the composing was finished, and the song was published in March 1948 with the name Trường ca Sông Lô (epic of the Lô River).

== Comments ==
The song received great praise from the musician Phạm Duy:

:The song "Trường ca Sông Lô" of Văn Cao is a magnificent work. This friend of mine was still a pioneer. He is the father of the type Trường ca. In the respect of form and appearance, his songs can equally compete with any masterpieces of the Western classical music. The music of (his) trường ca is very strong and bright. The rhythm is exptremely rich with very skillful shifts. This song marked the maturation of the New music...

...
"Trường ca sông Lô" have to be the highest peak of the Resistance music, in specific, and Vietnamese New music, in general."

— Phạm Duy, .
