= Trịnh Bửu Hoài =

Vietnamese poet

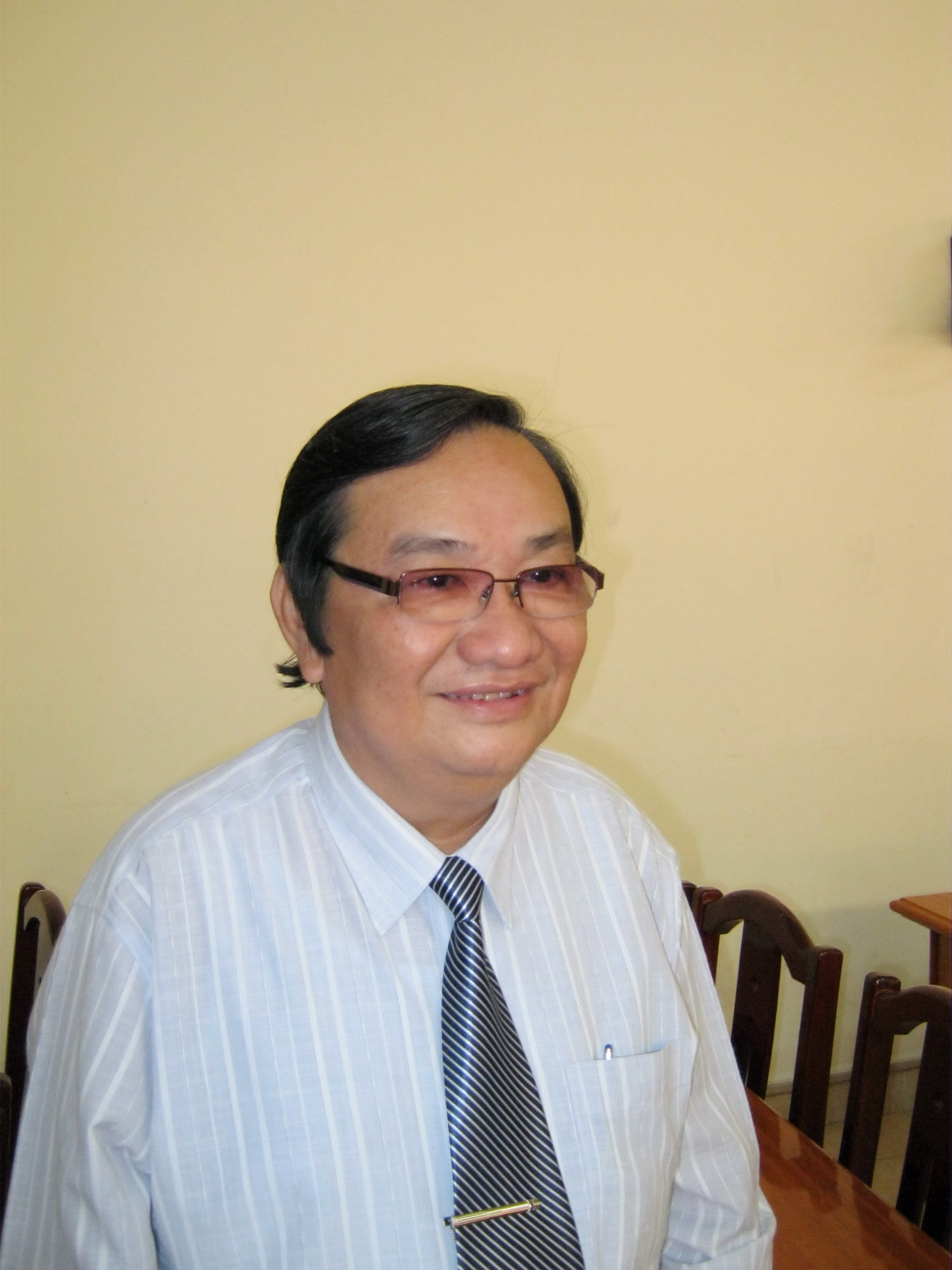
Trịnh Bửu Hoài

Trịnh Bửu Hoài (Mỹ Đức, Châu Phú, 16 May 1952) is a Vietnamese poet.

== Publications ==
Poetry collections unless other genre indicated:

- Thơ tình (1974)
- Mùa trăng (1984)
- Giữa hai mùa hẹn ước (trường ca, 1985)
- Nửa tuần trăng mật (novel, 1989)
- Quê xa (1994)
- Lẽo đẽo bụi hồng (1995)
- Vườn chim áo trắng (1988)
- Tứ tuyệt mùa xuân (2000)
- Ký ức (2002)
- Màu tím học trò (story, 2003)
- Chim xa cành (short story, 2004)
- Ngan ngát mùa xưa (2005)
