= Popular music of Vietnam =

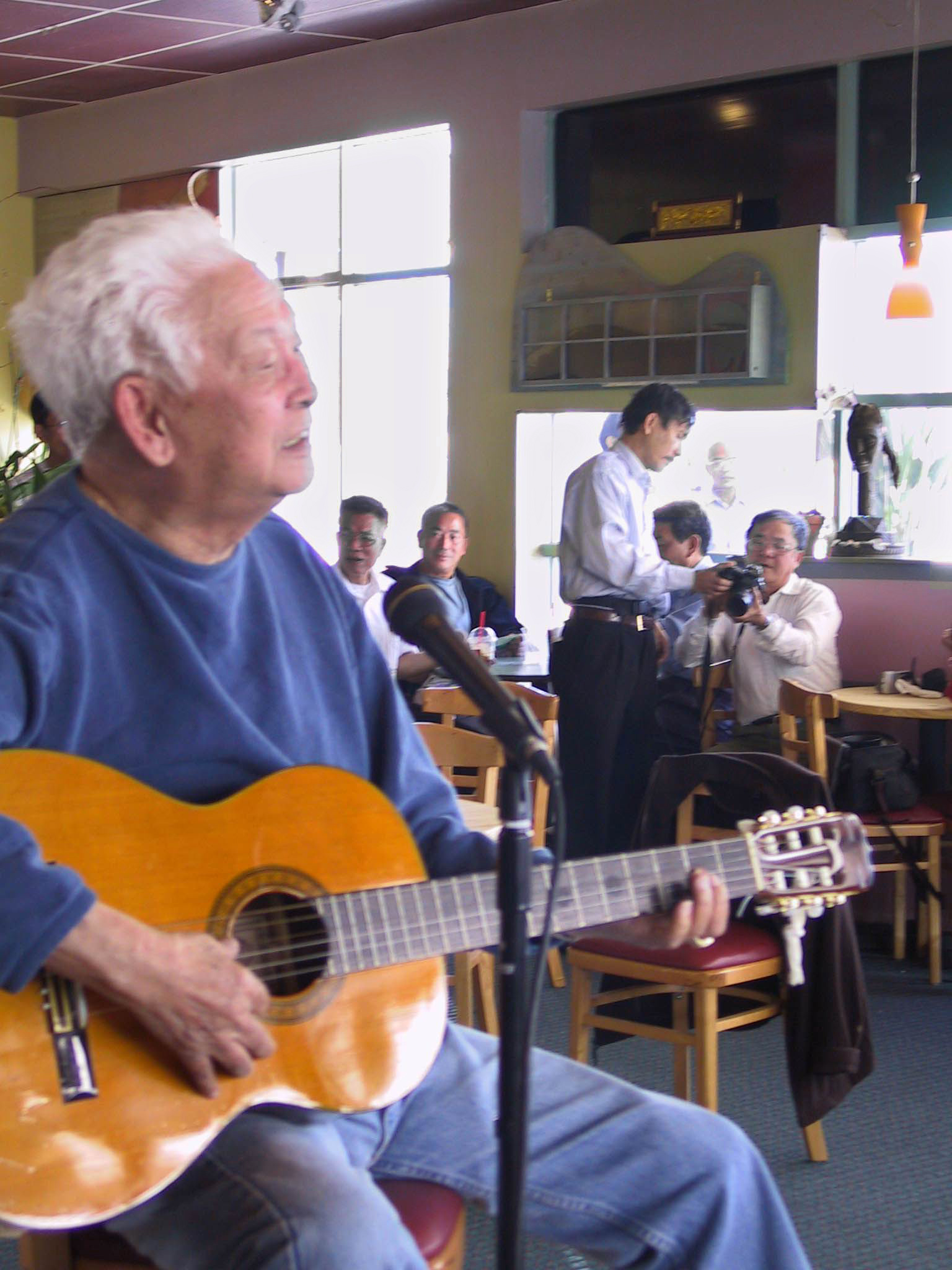
Phạm Duy (1921-2013), most prolific songwriter of Vietnam. With a musical career that spanned more than 70 years through some of the most turbulent periods of Vietnamese history and with more than 1000 songs to his credit

The Western-influenced popular music of Vietnam (Tân nhạc Việt Nam, "New music of Vietnam") developed from the 1940s–1980s.

== Singers, songwriters and singer-songwriters ==
The Vietnam War and the plight of Vietnamese refugees inspired a collection of musical pieces that have become "classical" anthems among Vietnamese people both in Vietnam and abroad.

There are many notable songwriters including the nicknamed three 'fathers' of popular music. They are Lam Phương (b. 1937), who is best known for his love songs and ballads, traditional Cải lương, and Vietnamese patriotic music, Phạm Duy (b. 1921), and Trịnh Công Sơn (b. 1939), known as the "Bob Dylan of Vietnam" whose songs were sung by Khánh Ly. Other notable songwriters include Văn Cao (b. 1923), a Vietnamese composer whose works include "Tiến Quân Ca", which became the national anthem of Vietnam, Dương Thụ (b. 1943), and Phú Quang (b. 1949), an influential Vietnamese composer primarily known for his love songs and songs about Hanoi.

== Modern Music ==
The songwriters of the 1970s are now "easy listening" for the middle aged, while the modern TV scene is dominated by Japanese-, Korean- and Cantopop influenced V-pop shows like Vietnam Idol.
