= Hoàng Cầm (poet) =

Vietnamese poet, playwright, and novelist

- Born: Bùi Tằng Việt; 22 February 1922; Bắc Giang, French Indochina
- Died: 6 May 2010 (aged 88); Hà Nội, Vietnam
- Occupations: Poet, novelist, playwright
- Writing career
- Language: Vietnamese

Hoàng Cầm (22 February 1922 – 6 May 2010) was pen name of Bùi Tằng Việt, a Vietnamese poet, playwright, and novelist. He is best remembered for his poems such as Bên kia sông Đuống, Lá diêu bông or the plays Kiều Loan and Hận Nam Quan. Being involved in the Nhân Văn affair, Hoàng Cầm retreated from the Vietnam Writers' Association in 1958, later in 2007 he was awarded the National Prize for Literature and Art by the Government of Vietnam.

== History ==
Bùi Tằng Việt was born in 1922 in Việt Yên, Bắc Giang to a scholar who came from Song Hồ commune, Thuận Thành, Bắc Ninh. Graduated from the Thăng Long High School in Hà Nội, Bùi Tằng Việt began his career as a writer and translator for the Tân dân xã publishing house which was owned by Vũ Đình Long, from that time he chose the pen name Hoàng Cầm which is the Vietnamese name of Scutellaria baicalensis – a fundamental herb in Traditional Chinese medicine.

In 1944, due to the tense condition of the war, Hoàng Cầm returned to his hometown Thuận Thành and participated in the Việt Minh movement. After the August Revolution, Hoàng Cầm once again went to Hà Nội and found a theatre company named Đông Phương. He began to organize cultural activities for the Vietnam People's Army from 1952 in the position of the Director of the Public Performing Company (Văn công) of the General Department of Politics. After the First Indochina War, Hoàng Cầm worked for the Vietnam Writers' Association from which he soon withdrew in 1958 because of his involvement in the Nhân Văn affair. In March 2007, Hoàng Cầm was awarded the National Prize for Literature and Art by the Government of Vietnam. He died on 6 May 2010 in Hà Nội at the age of 88.

== Works ==
=== Proses ===
- Hận ngày xanh (1940, based on Lamartine's works)
- Bông sen trắng ("The white lotus", 1940, based on Andersen's fairy tales)
- Cây đèn thần ("The wonderful lamp", 1941, based on Arabian Nights)
- Tỉnh giấc mơ vua ("Wakening from a king's dream", 1942, based on Arabian Nights)

=== Plays ===
- Hận Nam Quan ("The hatred on the South Pass", 1944)
- Kiều Loan (1946)
- Cô gái nước Tần ("The Qin girl", 1949)
- Viễn khách (1952)
- Lên đường (1952)
- Ông cụ Liên (1952)
- Lào Cai (1957)
- Trương Chi (1983)
- Tương lai (1995)

=== Poems ===
- Thoi mộng (1941)
- Những niềm tin (1965)
- Men đá vàng (truyện thơ, 1989)
- Bên kia sông Đuống (1948)
- Lá diêu bông (1959, included in both Mưa Thuận Thành, Về Kinh Bắc, and 99 tình khúc collections)

=== Poetry collections ===
- Tiếng hát quan họ ("The Quan họ melodies", 1956)
- Mưa Thuận Thành ("The Thuận Thành rain", 1991)
- Về Kinh Bắc ("Coming back to Kinh Bắc", published in 1994, includes 51 poems composed during 1959–1960)
- 99 tình khúc ("99 love poems", published in 1996, includes 98 poems composed during 1941–1995)
