= Lệ Thu =

Vietnamese singer (1943–2021)

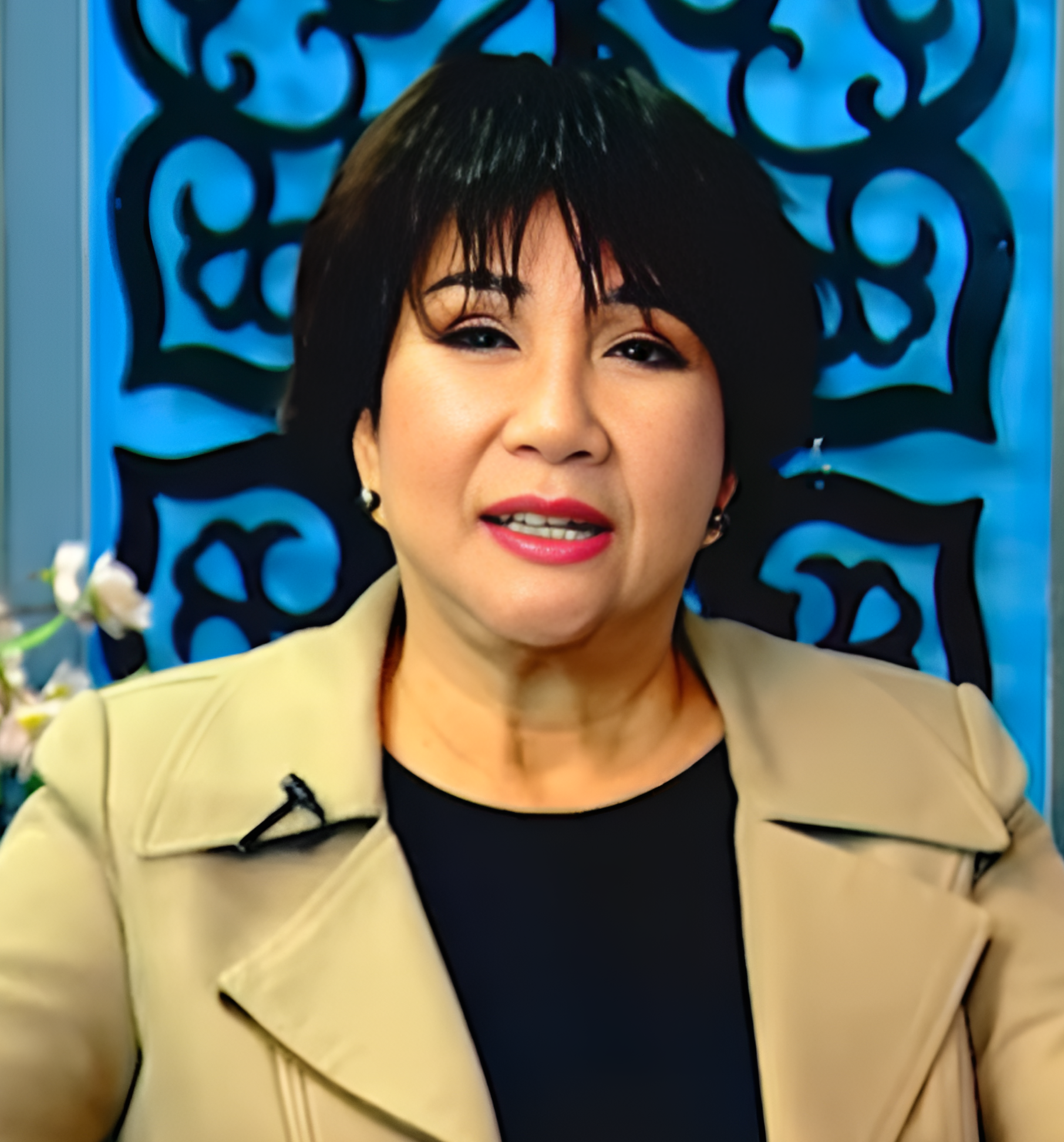
- Lệ Thu in 2017

Background information
- Also known as: Cecilia Bui-thi-Oanh
- Born: Bùi Thị Oanh; July 16, 1943; Hai Phong, French Indochina
- Origin: Saigon, Republic of Vietnam (now Vietnam)
- Died: January 15, 2021 (aged 77) Fountain Valley, California, United States
- Genres: Blues, Purple music, Vietnamese folk
- Occupation: Singer
- Instrument: Vocals
- Years active: 1962–2021

Oanh Thi "Cecilia" Bui, written in Vietnamese as "Bùi Thị Oanh" and known by the stage name Lệ Thu (July 16, 1943 – January 15, 2021), was a Vietnamese-American singer. Born in Hải Phòng, she was well known in South Vietnam in the 1960s and 1970s for singing the songs of singer-songwriters such as Trịnh Công Sơn and Phạm Duy. She released 24 singles and numerous albums with famous overseas Vietnamese singers like Khánh Ly, Hương Lan and Tuấn Ngọc.

== Biography ==
Lệ Thu was born on July 16, 1943, in Hai Phong of Tonkin with the name Bùi Thị Oanh and saint name Cecilia. She spent much of her childhood in Ha Dong. Her parents gave birth to eight children but the first seven died at the age of three, she was the only child left in the family. Her mother was the second wife. Because of the difficulties caused by the eldest wife, in 1953, she and her mother moved to Saigon.

In 1959, while studying French at Les Lauriers School in Tan Dinh, she went to Bong Lai Tea Room to listen to music. Being encouraged by friends, Lệ Thu stepped onto the stage. Immediately after that, the owner of the tea room invited her to sign a performance contract. Since then, she took the stage name Lệ Thu. In an interview, she said:

I took the name Le Thu because I hid my family. Actually that name was not in my subconscious mind but it suddenly turned out, I don't understand from where

After accepting the invitation to collaborate with Bồng Lai, she had to continue on her studies but after a while, she decided to quit school to pursue her music career. In 1962, she married a man named Son who returned from studying in France.

Lệ Thu gradually became a prominent singer in Saigon. From 1968 to 1971, her singing career was one of the factors that brought visitors to the Queen Bee, Tu Do and Ritz discos. In 1968, she joined the program Jo Marcel at Queen Bee discotheque. In addition to sing every night, she also signed a contract to record audio tapes for Jo Marcel, starting the golden age of her singing life. In 1969, Lệ Thu with the program Jo Marcel moved to Ritz on Tran Hung Dao Street. In 1970, she returned to Tu Do discotheque until it was destroyed by the Viet Cong Forces more than a year later.

During the Vietnam War, on April 28, 1975, Lệ decided to escape from her country and attempted to fly to California. Before that, her first marriage broke down. She married journalist Hong Duong, and later divorced but in November 1979, she and her youngest daughter crossed the sea to the refugee camp in Pulau Bidong, Malaysia, then flew to the United States in around the following year. Two years later, her two oldest daughters also crossed the border and reunited with her in Southern California. While she was in the United States, she continued to perform with the Vietnamese community together with the audience in a special performance held by musician Nam Loc in Beverley Hills. After that, she collaborated with discos like Tu Do, Lang Van and Maxim's. In 1981, Thu performed her first music tape overseas, titled "Sing on the road to death". Next were the tapes of Thu singing to people, including many songs that are associated with her name.

After the children grew up and got married, Lệ Thu spent most of her life alone in Fountain Valley, California. In 2007, she returned to Vietnam to perform memorialising the late composer Trịnh Công Sơn.

She died from COVID-19 at Orange Coast Memorial Hospital in Fountain Valley on January 15, 2021, during the COVID-19 pandemic in California. She was 77 years old.

== See also ==
She is to be distinguished from the female poet Lệ Thu (b. 1940).
