= Khánh Ly =

Vietnamese singer

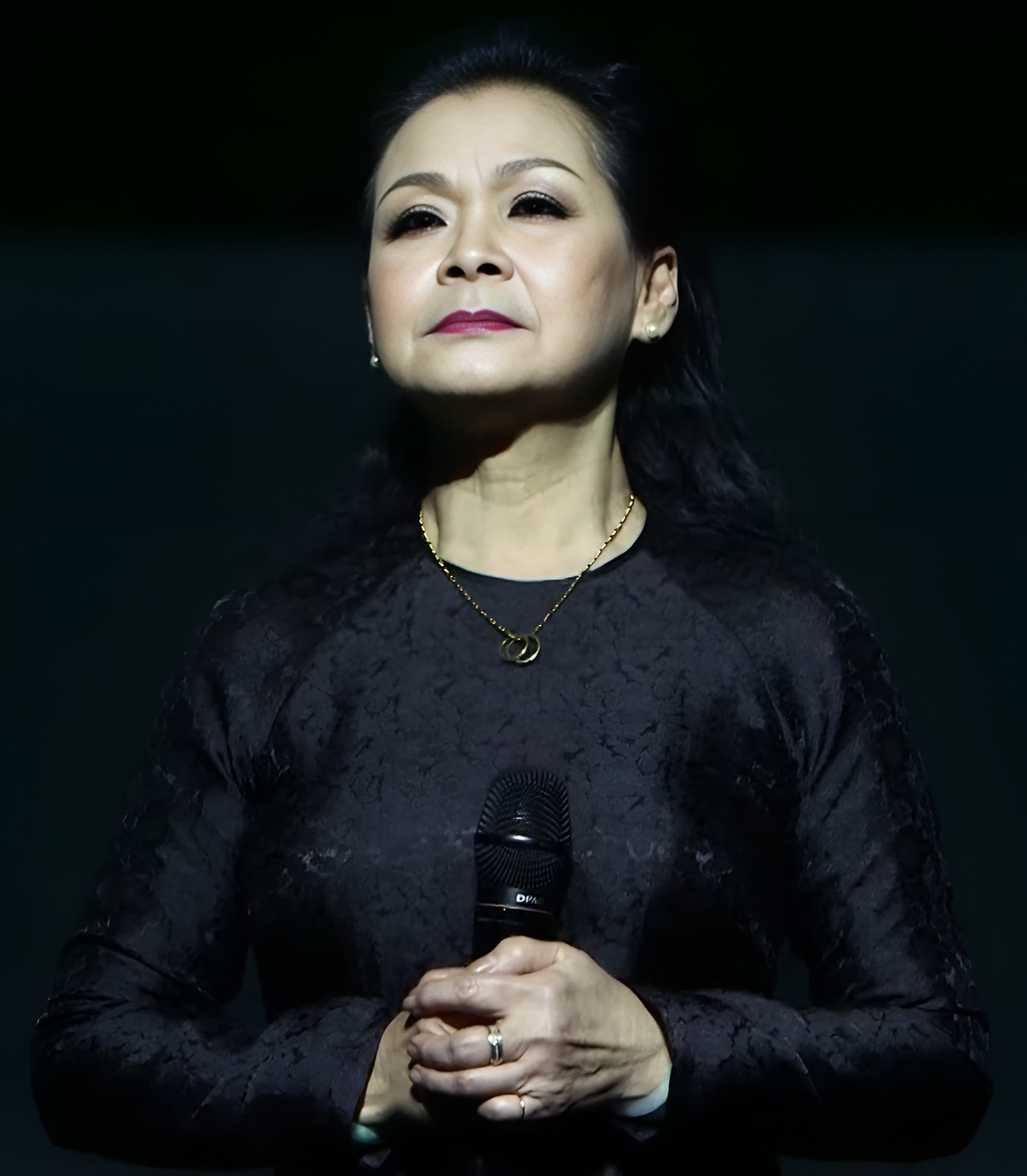
- Khánh Ly in 2016

Background information
- Born: Nguyễn Thị Lệ Mai; 6 March 1945 (age 81); Hanoi, French Indochina
- Occupation: Singer
- Instrument: Vocal
- Years active: 1962–present

Khánh Ly (born as Nguyễn Thị Lệ Mai; 6 March 1945) is a Vietnamese-American singer. She performed many songs written by Vietnamese composer Trịnh Công Sơn and rose to fame in the 1960s. She became one of the best-selling Vietnamese artists in history. She married South Vietnam journalist Nguyễn Hoàng Đoan in 1975.

== Life and career ==
=== Early life ===
Khánh Ly was born to a traditional family and grew up in Hanoi. Before moving to South Vietnam, her family lives at Hàng Bông Street. As a child, she would fall asleep to her father's soothing voice. His serenades planted a love for music inside her, which grew stronger every day against her family's wishes. In 1954, at 9, she entered a small contest in the city of Hanoi singing "Thơ Ngây"; she did not win.

By 1956, she accompanied her mother to the southern regions of Vietnam. At the end of that very same year, she secretly entered a children's talent-search contest produced by Radio France Asie (Đài Phát-thanh Pháp-Á), at Norodom Stage in Saigon. Mai traveled to the contest by sneaking into the back of transport trucks and hitching a ride from Đà Lạt City to Saigon. She won second prize singing Pham Duy's famous song, "Ngày Trở Về". Mai lost to child-star Quốc Thắng who would also later become an iconic figure in the music world. She was only 11.

=== 1962–1966: Debut ===
Mai's musical career did not officially begin until she debuted at Club Anh Vũ on 43 Bùi Viện Street in Saigon when she was only 17 (1962). At this point, she adopted the stage name Khánh Ly, a combination of Khánh Kỵ and Yêu Ly, both are characters from Chronicles of the Eastern Zhou Kingdoms, her favorite novel. By the end of 1962, she relocated to Đà Lạt and stayed there for four years performing at various clubs and resorts. Night after night, she serenaded lovers, tourists, and the youths of Vietnam. On a rainy night in 1964, she met Trịnh Công Sơn (TCS), at that time a young composer and a teacher at a school in Bảo Lộc. They became fast friends. Fascinated by her voice, Trinh had asked her on several occasions to accompany him in his performances in Saigon. Still in love with the romantic hills of Da Lat, she declined.

=== 1967–1975: Diva of Saigon ===
During a trip to Saigon in 1967, she ran into Trịnh on the streets of Lê Thánh Tôn. After several serenades and coffee at a small shop called Quán Văn, the legacy of Khánh Ly and Trịnh Công Sơn had begun. Within the next several decades, Khánh Ly and Trịnh Công Sơn sang together at small coffee shops, clubs, and even on the steps of Văn Khoa University in Saigon (a liberal arts school). During the escalation of a bloody war, his anti-war lyrics in the Yellow-Skin Songs and her voice appealed to those who grew weary of the battles and bloodshed; their plea for peace propelled them to the top. From the educating fields of large universities to farm lands, she was heard, known, and hailed as "Nữ Hoàng Chân Đất" (the barefoot diva) or "Nữ Hoàng Sân Cỏ." (the grassy fields diva) Together, Khánh Ly and Trịnh Công Sơn took the Vietnamese music world by storm. Their phenomenal fame gave her the chance to be the first Vietnamese woman to headline her own show. During the late 1960s to early 1970s, she also collaborated with multiple production companies and played a large part on the recorded tracks from famous videos such as the Phạm Mạnh Cương Program, Trường Sơn Centre, Sơn Ca Productions, Hoạ Mi, Jo Marcel Productions, etc.

Up until her emigration in 1975, Khánh Ly achieved disproportionate fame around the world. She opened Club Khánh Ly on Tự Do Street in Saigon along with a small shop named Hội Quán Cây Tre, a gathering place for musicians and students alike. In addition, she was sponsored by the Vietnamese government to hold performances in Europe to promote the worldwide collaboration of the rising generation of Vietnamese students ("Nối Vòng Tay Lớn") ("United Circle of Hands"). She also performed in the United States, Canada, and Japan at the Osaka Fair in response to an invitation from Nippon Columbia Label (a large production company). Here, she recorded an album featuring Trịnh Công Sơn's songs Diễm Xưa and Ca Dao Mẹ (sang in both languages), which went gold shortly after its debut. These songs became top hits in Japan and remained so for several decades. Khánh Ly was the first Vietnamese singer to achieve international fame.

=== 1975–present: Continue career after The Fall of Saigon ===
In 1975, Khánh Ly, along with thousands of Vietnamese refugees, crossed the Pacific Ocean and settled in America. Like many, she struggled to find jobs on American soil to provide for her four children. Even though the first few years were difficult, Khánh Ly's renowned status did not fade from the music world. In the late 1970s and throughout the 1980s, Khanh Ly was invited back to Japan on numerous occasions by Nippon Columbia Label, Toci Film, and Japan's largest television station to record and perform. Her second record with Nippon Columbia (1979) went gold short after its release; there were 2 million copies sold in Japan alone. Her third and final album with Nippon also featured classic hits such as Wandering Man. In addition, both Toci Film and Japan's largest television station featured her voice in the theme song to several movies and television series regarding Vietnam's culture as well as the "Boat People" phenomenon; her most notable recording was "Lời Ru Cho Đà Nẵng" in 1987, music by Japanese artist Hako Yamasaki and words by former newspaper editor and Khánh Ly's husband, Nguyễn Hoàng Đoan. She was also featured in the Asian Music Festival held in Japan, along with famous singers from Korea, Hong Kong, Thailand, and the South Pacific. Her fame in Japan continued to escalate when she was named one of the top 10 most famous people, alongside Gandhi, Gucci, and Martin Luther King Jr.'s wife, among others. In 1996, Japan's television station NHK and famous producer Hideo Kado produced a 50-minute documentary about the life of Khánh Ly, which aired on 29 April 1997, 22 years after the day she left Saigon. In September of that year, NHK also published a 270-page biography about Khánh Ly.

In the later part of the 1980s and early 1990s, Khánh Ly travelled vigorously and performed in Russia, the Czech Republic, Poland, and in a concert in East Germany after the Berlin Wall was taken down in 1989. Being a devout Catholic, she also sang at many church-sponsored events in which her most memorable performance was at the Canonization of 117 Vietnamese Priests in Vatican City (1988) where she met Pope John Paul II. In 1992, during the World Youth Festival in Denver, Colorado, Khánh Ly had the honour of meeting the Pope for a second time. In 1996, she, several other renowned singers, and songwriter Trầm Tử Thiêng hosted a Charity Concert to raise money to build houses/shelters for 2000 Vietnamese refugees in the Philippines.

She lives with her husband, former newspaper editor/writer Nguyễn Hoàng Đoan in Cerritos, California. She records for Thúy Nga-Paris by Night, Asia and May Productions. She co-owns a production company, Khánh Ly Productions, which has produced more than 30 CDs, 4 videos, and several DVDs. She also writes weekly columns for various Vietnamese newspaper and magazines (Hồn Việt, Văn Nghệ Tự Do, Văn Nghệ Magazine, Thời Báo, Báo Mai, etc.). Khánh Ly is devoted to humanitarian acts and charitable organisations for Vietnamese orphans and refugees worldwide. She has wished: "To breathe my last breath on the stage which gave me life...."

On 9 May 2014, she had her first concert in Vietnam National Convention Center, Hanoi, Vietnam, at which she performed to thousands of fans.

== Personal life ==
She was married the first time to Minh Di and had two children with him. Her second marriage was to Mai Bá Trác, a soldier of South Vietnam and they had a daughter. Khánh Ly later married Nguyễn Hoàng Đoan, a Vietnamese journalist.

There were rumors about her love for musician Trịnh Công Sơn, but Trịnh Công Sơn denied it and said that they were just good friends.

In an interview reported by BBC, Khánh Ly said that she was not bothered by the Vietnamese Government's censorship of overseas songs because "singing songs that people don't allow will cause troubles", and "sometimes, what we like is not necessarily what others like".

== Discography ==
=== Cassettes and CDs ===
- 1967 – Ghi âm trực tiếp tại Quán Văn (with Trịnh Công Sơn)
- 1969 – Hát cho quê hương Việt Nam 1 (performed Trịnh Công Sơn songs)
- 1970?- Nhạc Tuyển 1 (with Trịnh Công Sơn)
- 1970 – Hát cho quê hương Việt Nam 2 (performed Trịnh Công Sơn songs)
- 1971 – Băng nhạc Tình ca 1 (with Sĩ Phú, Duy Trác and Thanh Lan)
- 1971 – Hát cho quê hương Việt Nam 3 (performed Trịnh Công Sơn songs)
- 1971 – Tứ quý (with Lệ Thu, Duy Trác, and Tuấn Ngọc)
- 1973 – Hát cho quê hương Việt Nam 4 (performed Trịnh Công Sơn songs)
- 1973 – Như cánh vạc bay (performed Trịnh Công Sơn songs)
- 1974 – Hát cho quê hương Việt Nam 5 (performed Trịnh Công Sơn songs)
- 1974 – Sơn Ca 7 (performed Trịnh Công Sơn songs)
- 1976 – Khi tôi về
- 1976 – Như cánh vạc bay (performed Trịnh Công Sơn songs)
- 1976 – Giáng Sinh-Quê hương còn đó nỗi buồn. Khánh Ly, Sĩ Phú, Mai Hương
- 1976 – Hát cho quê hương Việt Nam 6 (Nhạc Tuyển 1 rerelease) (with Trịnh Công Sơn)
- 1977 – Hát cho những người ở lại
- 1977 – Tình ca mùa hạ
- 1979 – Người di tản buồn
- 1980 – Lời buồn thánh (performed Trịnh Công Sơn songs)
- 1981 – Đừng yêu tôi (performed Vũ Thành An songs)
- 1981 – Giọt lệ cho ngàn sau (performed Từ Công Phụng songs)
- 1981 – Bông hồng cho người ngã ngựa
- 1981 – Tủi nhục ca. Khánh Ly (performed Hà Thúc Sinh songs)
- 1982 – Tắm mát ngọn sông đào
- 1983 – Ướt mi (performed Trịnh Công Sơn songs)
- 1983 – Bản tango cuối cùng
- 1984 – Trong tay anh đêm nay, Dạ vũ Valse
- 1984 – Lá đổ muôn chiều (Tà áo xanh) (performed Đoàn Chuẩn songs)
- 1984 – Bài tango cho em
- 1985 – Khối tình Trương Chi (with Sĩ Phú)
- 1985 – Biển nhớ (performed Trịnh Công Sơn songs)
- 1985 – Bông bưởi chiều xưa (performed Châu Đình An songs)
- 1986 – Hạ trắng (performed Trịnh Công Sơn songs)
- 1986 – Niệm khúc cuối (with Elvis Phương)
- 1986 – Thương một người
- 1986 – Tango tango
- 1987 – Tình không biên giới
- 1987 – Ai trở về xứ Việt
- 1987 – Bên ni bên nớ (performed Phạm Duy songs)
- 1987 – Như cánh vạc bay (with Lệ Thu)
- 1987 – Đêm hạ hồng (with Lệ Thu and Thanh Phong)
- 1988 – Boston buồn
- 1988 – Tango điên (Vũ nữ thân gầy)
- 1989 – Kinh khổ (performed Trầm Tử Thiêng songs)
- 1989 – Mưa hồng
- 1989 – Đêm hạnh ngộ
- 1989 – Niệm khúc hoa vàng
- 1989 – Xóa tên người tình (with Elvis Phương)
- 1990 – Tình nhớ (performed Trịnh Công Sơn songs)
- 1990 – Tình hờ (with Elvis Phương)
- 1991 – Vũng lầy của chúng ta (performed Lê Uyên Phương songs)
- 1991 – Tưởng rằng đã quên
- 1991 – Lệ đá (with Lệ Thu and Kim Anh)
- 1991 – Best of Khánh Ly
- 1992 – Ca dao mẹ
- 1992 – Bên đời hiu quạnh (performed Trịnh Công Sơn songs)
- 1992 – Một cõi đi về (Im lặng thở dài) (performed Trịnh Công Sơn songs)
- 1993 – Dốc mơ
- 1993 – Tôi ơi đừng tuyệt vọng. Tiếng hát Khánh Ly, Trịnh Công Sơn và Trịnh Vĩnh Trinh
- 1994 – Để lại cho em (performed Phạm Duy songs)
- 1994 – Em còn nhớ hay em đã quên (tái bản từ Bông hồng cho người ngã ngựa)
- 1994 – Ừ thôi em về (Shotguns record collection từ '70 rerelease)
- 1995 – Đời vẫn hát
- 1996 – Ca khúc da vàng, Volume 1 (performed Trịnh Công Sơn songs)
- 1997 – Mùa thu xa em: Khánh Ly đặc biệt
- 1998 – Ca khúc da vàng, Volume 2 (performed Trịnh Công Sơn songs)
- 1999 – Ca khúc da vàng, Volume 3 (performed Trịnh Công Sơn songs)
- 1999 – Hiên cúc vàng (performed Nguyễn Đình Toàn songs)
- 1999 – Nguyệt ca (performed Trịnh Công Sơn songs)
- 2000 – Đời cho ta thế (performed Trịnh Công Sơn songs)
- 2000 – Tình thu trên cao (performed Nguyễn Xuân Điềm songs)
- 2001 – Một sớm mai về (performed Trầm Tử Thiêng songs)
- 2002 – Nếu có yêu tôi
- 2002 – Mưa trên cây hoàng lan (performed Nguyễn Đình Toàn songs)
- 2003 – Còn tuổi nào cho em (performed Trịnh Công Sơn songs)
- 2005 – Ca khúc da vàng, Volume 4 (performed Trịnh Công Sơn songs)
- 2008 – TangoGoTango
- 2009 – Như một vết thương (performed Trịnh Công Sơn songs)
- 2011 – Nụ cười trăm năm (performed Trần Dạ Từ songs)
- 2011 – Chưa phai (thơ Cẩm Vân phổ nhạc)

=== DVDs ===
- 1982 – Khánh Ly in Japan
- 1988 – Ai Trở Về Xứ Việt
- 1991 – Một Đời Việt Nam
- 2005 – Thuở Ấy Mưa Hồng
- 2012 – Thánh ca dâng Mẹ
