= Hàng Bông Street =

Street in Hanoi, Vietnam

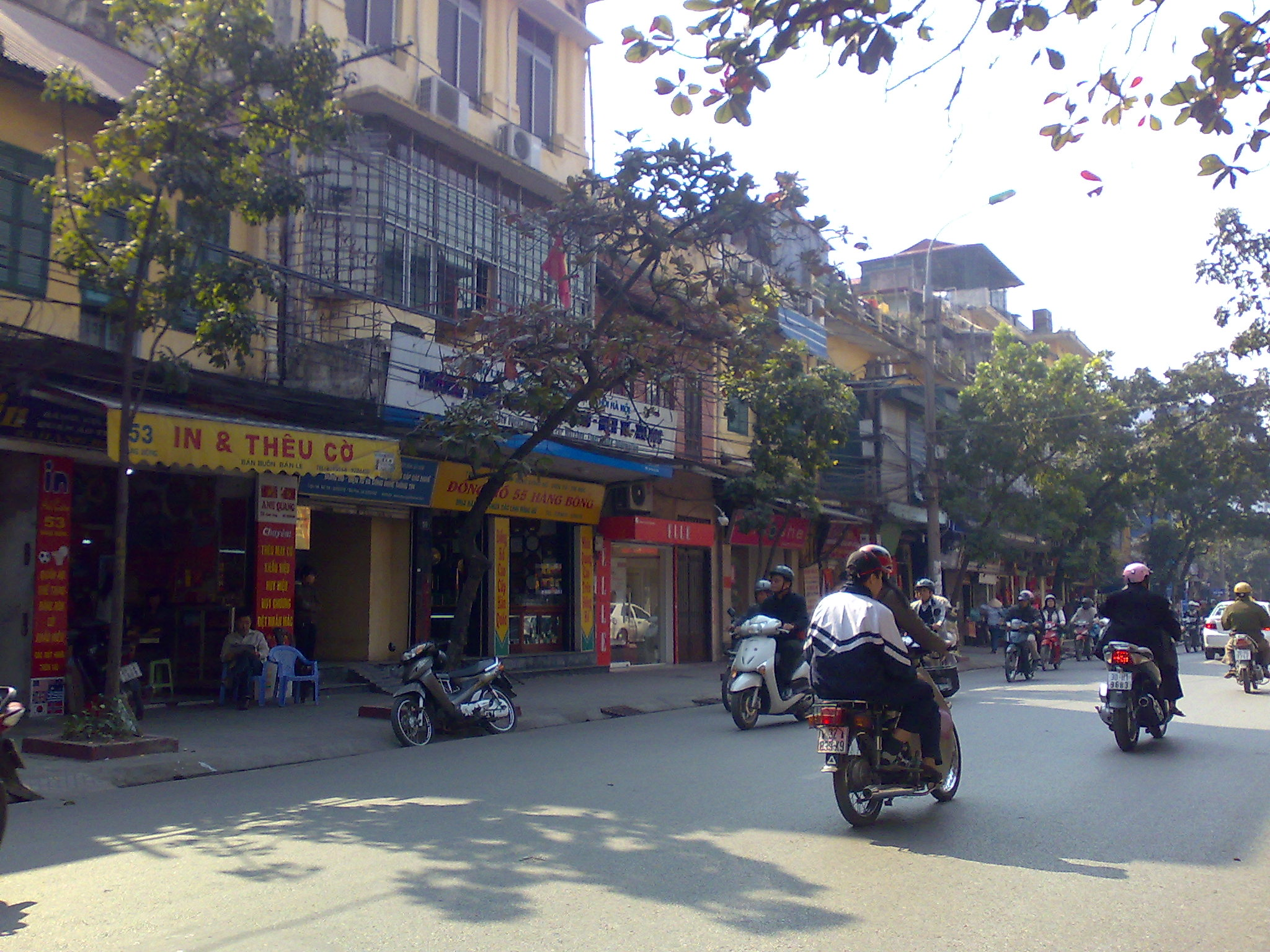
- Ancient print and book shops, remain on Hang Bong
- Former name(s): Hàng Bông Hài; Hàng Bông Đệm; Hàng Bông Cây Đa Cửa Quyền; Hàng Bông Lờ; Hàng Bông Nhuộm
- Owner: Hanoian people
- Length: 932 m (3,058 ft)
- Width: 14 m
- Addresses: Hoan Kiem, Hanoi
- Location: Hang Gai and Hang Bong wards, Hoan Kiem, Hanoi
- Postal code: 10
- Coordinates: 21°1′50.35″N 105°50′52.83″E

Hàng Bông Street (Vietnamese: Phố Hàng Bông), formerly Rue du Coton during the French colonial period, is a street in ancient quarter of Hanoi. It continues from the crossroad Hàng Bông - Hàng Gai - Hàng Trong - Hàng Hom to the former city gate Cửa Nam (South Gate) with length about 932 m. Hàng Bông was once a street which produced cotton to make clothes or winter blankets. Today Hàng Bông is one of the busiest streets of Hanoi for shopping with art galleries, silk shops, and clothes shops.
