= Lam Phương =

Vietnamese songwriter (1937–2020)

- Born: Lâm Đình Phùng; March 20, 1937; Rạch Giá, Kiên Giang, French Cochinchina (modern Vietnam)
- Died: December 22, 2020 (aged 83) Fountain Valley, California, United States
- Genres: Vietnamese New Music (Tân nhạc Việt Nam)

Lam Phương, real name Lâm Đình Phùng (March 20, 1937 – December 22, 2020), was a Vietnamese popular music songwriter.

== Biography ==
=== Background, military career and struggles ===
Lam Phương was born in Vĩnh Thanh Vân village, now a part of Rạch Giá, Kiên Giang Province. In the front of his house was a river, and across the river was Thập Phương Temple. As a result, his childhood memories and imagery prominently featured small rowing boats (con đò) ferrying people across the river, the sound of ringing temple bells, and vast rice paddies, which were etched in his mind throughout his life from childhood and later influenced his musical works. As a very young child, he was fascinated by the sound of ringing temple bells.

When he was 10 years old, his mother sent him to Saigon to study, living at his uncle's house. He began to study music on his own, and was fortunate to be instructed by musician Hoang Lang and musician Le Thuong. His first song was composed in an afternoon, written at 15 years old. He borrowed money from friends to hire a printing house to rent music, then rented a music truck to perform throughout Saigon. In the beginning, he encountered many financial difficulties when he often had to borrow money from his friends to release music works by himself. Succeeding with his first work, Lam Phuong was more and more diligent in writing. Three years later, Lam Phuong released a series of songs about his homeland, the most famous of which is "Khúc ca ngày mùa" (Seasonal Song), which was chosen by most schools in the Mekong Delta region to teach dance students.

Lam Phuong's pseudonym was set by himself, from two words in his real name Lam and Phung with the meaning "toward the blue sky of hope".

=== Military career ===
In 1958, Lam Phuong joined the Army of the Republic of Vietnam. Returning to the civil society for a while, the order was re-enlisted, joining the Bao An entertainment group. After the delegation disbanded, he joined the Hoa Tinh Thuong performance and eventually the Central Arts and Culture Group until Saigon collapsed.

On the morning of April 30, 1975, he and his family boarded the Truong Xuan ship for refuge and could not bring any assets with them. Later, he was transferred to Virginia, US, then he moved back to Texas, and then California. In order to have money to support his wife and children, Lam Phuong had to do all kinds of jobs, from cleaning the floor, cleaning up Sears, to hard work like sharpening, but reserving his lifestyle; it all came downhill in his later years as he faced many struggles.

=== Struggles ===
After the life where the land gradually stabilized every weekend, he tried to hire a restaurant to make a musical theater for literary friends to meet, to Tuy Hong and he had the opportunity to relive with musicals. After divorcing Tuy Hong, he left for Paris. Here, he worked for a grocery store, cleaning, packing, porting ... Until one day, he met a new love and he married the woman named Huong, but this woman also left him and followed others.

In 1995, Lam Phuong returned to the US and married another woman. In early 1999, he suffered a stroke and hemiplegia. In this time, he met many difficulties but also received countless emotions. From the fact that the younger sister left the French food store to fly to the US to take care of him, it was about a music lover from Australia buying him a house and calling him every day to talk. She even went to the place, threw the wheelchair away to make him go on his own. Those feelings helped Lam Phuong musician gradually recover, however, it could not be the same.

=== Life and work as song composer ===
He is considered one of the main pioneers of Southern Vietnamese Music.

At the age of 15, he began to compose "Chiều thu ấy" (That Autumn Afternoon), but it was not until 1954 that he became famous with two articles of "Kiếp nghèo" (Poor Fate) and "Chuyến đò vỹ tuyến" (The Parallel Line Ferry). Lam Phuong's music in the 1950s was primarily a feeling of emigration in 1954, including songs such as "Nhạc rừng khuya" (Late Night Forest Music) and "Đoàn người lữ thứ" (Procession of Wanderers); talk about the army of the Republic of Vietnam such as "Tình anh lính chiến" (Love of a Soldier) and "Chiều hành quân" (Marching Afternoon).

By the 1960s, Lam Phuong wrote many famous songs and gave him huge financial benefits. At that time, the salary of an army colonel who both paid about 50,000 ARVN coins, and a director's salary was in a similar range. while musician Lam Phuong once went to Dalat to perform arts, sat on the boarding house looked down into the valley and he wrote the article Sad City and sold it for 12 million VND. In addition, there are many other songs, such as "Tình bơ vơ" (Lonely Love) and "Duyên kiếp" (Fated Love)... that makes him a great asset.

In parallel with composing and performing with military bands, Lam Phuong also collaborated with the national cinema center, appearing in several films bearing the theme of social improvement such as New Horizon, New Belief.

After a time of suffering with his love affairs, Lam Phuong musician is married. At that time, he wrote many of the most cheerful works, especially the Happiness Day. The song was chosen as the soundtrack to the Gia Binh Radio Program and used by many people in weddings.

While in Vietnam, musician Lam Phuong has a huge asset in the bank. However, on the morning of April 30, 1975, he and his family boarded the Truong Xuan ship for refugees but could not carry any assets as well as many others, leaving with empty hands. When on the deck he wrote the article Destiny ship with the song "When you see the road is far away, now the way back to the country is a thousand times farther away". When he came to the United States, he wrote the Lost version with the song "Da dark" after leaving the hometown to be darker, leaving his homeland when he changed his life ".

Lam Phuong musician after coming to the US, in difficult circumstances when having to make money with heavy manual work, unfortunately the broken family happiness. He was extremely distressed and wrote a series of songs that the title only had 1 word like "Điên" (Crazy),"Lầm" (Mistake) and "Say" (Drunk).

Once again, he left his hand to Paris, but as he said that people went to political asylum and I refuge in love. Here he met a woman named Huong and wrote a series of extremely cheerful songs like "Bé yêu" (My Little Darling) and "Bài tango cho em" (Tango for You). A prime example is "Mùa thu yêu đương" (Autumn Love) with the lyric "The road to Paris has a lot of pink buds", pink here comes from the woman named Huong. However, this situation did not go anywhere, so he eventually wrote "Tình vẫn chưa yên" (Love Is Still Uneasy). At the same time, he began to collaborate and help the center of Thuy Nga until now.

Lam Phuong died on December 22, 2020, following a battle of heart failure and a stroke in Fountain Valley, California.

== Songwriting ==
In recognition of the continuing popularity of his songs, the gala series Paris By Night has four times devoted tributes to his songs:

- Paris By Night 22: "40 Năm âm nhạc Lam Phương"
- Paris By Night 28: "Lam Phương 2 - Dòng nhạc tiếp nối - Sacrée Soirée 3"
- Paris By Night 88: "Lam Phương - Đường về quê hương"
- Paris By Night 102: "Nhạc Yêu Cầu Lam Phương"
