= Nguyễn Đình Thi =

Writer (1924–2003)

- Nguyễn Đình Thi, in the 1970s
- Born: 20 December 1924; Luang Prabang, Laos
- Died: 18 April 2003 (aged 78); Hanoi, Vietnam
- Occupations: Writer; Poet; Composer; Culture manager
- Awards: Ho Chi Minh Prize

Nguyễn Đình Thi (20 December 1924 – 18 April 2003) was a famous Vietnamese writer, poet and composer, most notable for writing Diệt phát xít, the song that became the official daily theme tune of the Voice of Vietnam.

== Biography ==
He was born on 20 December 1924, in Luang Prabang, Laos. His home, Vũ Thạch Village, is now known as Bà Triệu street, Tràng Tiền ward, Hoàn Kiếm District, Hanoi, Vietnam. His father was an official in the Indochina Post Office, who moved to Laos to work.

He came back to Vietnam in 1931, to study in Haiphong City and joined the Youth Rescue nation in 1941. He belonged to the generation of artists who were involved in the French defeat in the 1950s. He wrote essays on philosophy, poetry, music and drama.

After the August Revolution (1945), Nguyễn Đình Thi became the general secretary of the national culture association. From 1958 to 1989 he was secretary of the Vietnamese Writers association. From 1995, he was chairman of the Vietnam Union of Literature and Art Association. In 1996, he received the Ho Chi Minh Prize for literature. He died on 18 April 2003, in Hanoi.

In 1951 he met the French poet Madeleine Riffaud in Berlin at an international meeting of youth for peace. She fell in love with him and moved in with him when he was minister of culture in Vietnam, but then had to leave the country. Their subsequent long-distance relationship lasted for 50 years.

== Works ==
=== Philosophy ===
- Triết học nhập môn ("Introduction to philosophy") 1942
- Triết học Căng ("Kant's philosophy") 1942
- Triết học Nitsơ ("Nietzsche's philosophy") 1942
- Triết học Anhxtanh ("Einstein's philosophy") 1942

=== Musical compositions ===
- Diệt phát xít ("Annihilate Fascist"), was composed in 1945, first performed in the Grand Opera House's Square meeting – the starting event of August Revolution in Hanoi – other two songs performed in the meeting were Tiến quân ca of Văn Cao and Du kích ca of Đỗ Nhuận. Diệt phát xít was chosen as the official daily theme tune of the Voice of Vietnam.
- Người Hà Nội ("People of Hanoi"), was composed and first performed in 1947, completed in 1948, a typical song of Nhạc đỏ, associated with singer Lê Dung's career. Người Hà Nội is the official daily theme tune of the Hanoi Radio Television since its first formed day.

=== Novels ===
- Xung kích ("Vanguard") 1951
- Bên bờ sông Lô ("On the Lô river bank") 1957
- Vào lửa ("Come in fire") 1966
- Mặt trận trên cao ("Aerial battle") 1967
- Vỡ bờ ("Broken Edge") section 1 – 1962, section 2 – 1970

=== Essays ===
- Mấy vấn đề văn học ("Some matters of literature") 1956
- Công việc của người viết tiểu thuyết ("Work of novel writer") 1964

=== Poems ===
- Đất nước ("Country") 1948–1955
- Người chiến sĩ ("The soldier", poetry collection) 1956
- Bài thơ Hắc Hải ("Black Sea Poem") 1958
- Dòng sông trong xanh ("Pure Blue River") 1974
- Tia nắng ("Sunbeam") 1983

=== Plays ===
- Con nai đen ("Black Deer") 1961
- Hoa và Ngần ("Hoa and Ngần") 1975
- Nguyễn Trãi ở Đông Quan ("Nguyễn Trãi in Eastern Gate") 1979
- Rừng trúc ("Bamboo Forest") 1979
- Người đàn bà hóa đá ("Petrified woman") 1980
- Giấc mơ ("Dream") 1983
- Tiếng sóng ("The sound of waves") 1985

== Memory ==
A street along the southern bank of the West Lake (Hanoi) was named after Nguyễn Đình Thi since 2015.

In 2020, writer Nguyễn Đình Chính – a son of writer Nguyễn Đình Thi – established the Nguyễn Đình Thi Prize for Art and Literature, covering many fields that Nguyễn Đình Thi has devoted himself to, including literature, music, theater, fine arts, and art criticism, mainly for authors who have made many contributions to the country and rising young talents.
