= Tiến quân ca =

National anthem of Vietnam

English: The Song of the Marching Troops
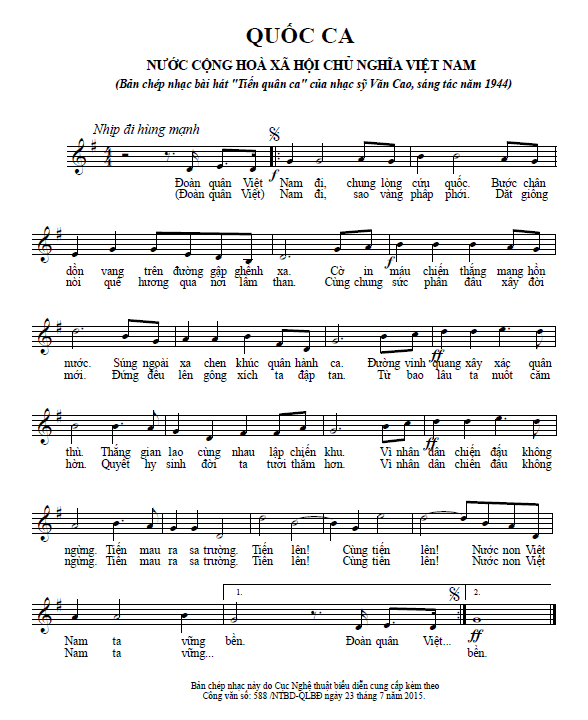
- Official sheet music published by the Government of Vietnam
- National anthem of Vietnam
- Lyrics: Văn Cao, 1944
- Music: Văn Cao, 1944
- Adopted: 1946 (Democratic Republic of Vietnam); 1976 (Socialist Republic of Vietnam)
- Relinquished: 1976 (Democratic Republic of Vietnam)
- Preceded by: Giải phóng miền Nam (as the anthem of Republic of South Vietnam)

Audio sample
- Official instrumental version (2015): file; help

"Tiến quân ca" (Vietnamese pronunciation: [tiən˧˦ kwən˧ kaː˧], lit. 'The Song of the Marching Troops') is the national anthem of Vietnam. The march was written and composed by Văn Cao in 1944, and was adopted as the national anthem of the Democratic Republic of Vietnam in 1946 (as per the 1946 constitution) and subsequently the Socialist Republic of Vietnam in 1976 following the reunification of Vietnam. Though it has two verses, only the first one is usually sung.

== History ==
Its lyrics and title were based on Văn Cao's previous works, "Thăng Long" (lit. "Rising Dragon", a former name of Hanoi). Part of the lyrics were also different during its early stages, as it went through numerous changes starting in the early 1940s.

=== Lyric changes and completion ===
"Tiến quân ca" went through many changes shortly after it was composed. For instance, the first sentence "Đoàn quân Việt Nam đi" ("The Vietnamese army marches") was originally "Đoàn quân Việt Minh đi" ("The Viet Minh army marches""). The sixth part of the lyrics was also originally "Thề phanh thây uống máu quân thù" ("We swear to tear apart the enemy and drink their blood"), expressing his anger at the colonialists for letting two million Vietnamese people perish in the 1945 famine. After many suggestions, Văn Cao changed it to "Vì nhân dân chiến đấu không ngừng" ("For the people let's struggle until the end"). The last sentence "Tiến lên! Cùng thét lên! Chí trai là nơi đây ước nguyền!" ("Together we shout onwards, our spirit is here") was changed to "Núi sông Việt Nam ta vững bền" ("Vietnam's mountains and rivers shall withstand forever"), but when it was published it was changed to "Nước non Việt Nam ta vững bền!", which had the same meaning but a slightly different tone, which Văn Cao commented,

"With a song that requires solemnity, 'nước non' seemed too weak while being sung with 'núi sông' would be more reasonable."

After completing the work, Văn Cao met and let Vũ Quý try out the song. Vũ Quý was very happy at his work, and "Tiến quân ca" was published in the papers in November 1944 with lithographs by Văn Cao.

On 17 August, 1945, the song was sung for the first time at a rally of civil servants in Hanoi by a Ph.D under the flag of the Việt Minh, and "robbed the loudspeakers". Văn Cao quoted, "That quiet man was an attraction to thousands of people listening that day".

The poet and musician Nguyễn Đình Thi was touched after hearing Văn Cao sing the song and asked each person to write another song for "The Viet Minh Frontline". He posted his own "Diệt Phát Xít", meaning "Kill the Fascists", which later became the official start up song and hymn of Voice of Vietnam. Văn Cao wrote "Chiến Sĩ Việt Nam", meaning "Vietnam Warriors". Both songs are still popular and sung to the public today.

=== As a National Anthem ===
On 17 August, 1945, Hồ Chí Minh approved "Tiến quân ca" to be officially recognized as the anthem of the newly established Democratic Republic of Vietnam.

On 2 September, 1945, a parade was performed on the day of the Declaration of independence of the Democratic Republic of Vietnam at Ba Đình Square by the Liberation Army band commanded by Đinh Ngọc Liên. A day before, musicians Đinh Ngọc Liên, Nguyễn Hữu Hiếu, and Văn Cao discussed changing the two words in "Tiến quân ca" in order to shorten the song by shortening the length of the first E pitches in the word "đoàn" and the F in the middle of the word "xác" to make the song more "snappy".

In 1946, the first National Assembly officially recognized "Tiến quân ca" as the national anthem. In Article 3 of the first Constitution of the Democratic Republic of Vietnam, it stated directly about the national anthem. In 1955, the 5th session of the first National Assembly decided to invite authors to participate in another editing of the song. Văn Cao had regrets after this because the "heroic spirit" of the song had been lost after being edited.

After the fall of the government of South Vietnam, and on 2 July, 1976, the Provisional Revolutionary Government of the Republic of South Vietnam and the Democratic Republic of Vietnam agreed to be reunified into the new Socialist Republic of Vietnam. "Tiến quân ca" was chosen as the official National Anthem. In 1981, a contest was opened for a new national anthem but after more a year, it was and has never been mentioned again nor are there any official statement about the results. Thus, "Tiến quân ca" remains today as the national anthem of Vietnam.

== Official lyrics ==
Vietnamese original

I
Đoàn quân Việt Nam đi, chung lòng cứu quốc!
Bước chân dồn vang trên đường gập ghềnh xa.
Cờ in máu chiến thắng mang hồn nước,
Súng ngoài xa chen khúc quân hành ca.
Đường vinh quang xây xác quân thù,
Thắng gian lao cùng nhau lập chiến khu.

Điệp khúc:
Vì nhân dân chiến đấu không ngừng,
Tiến mau ra sa trường!
Tiến lên, cùng tiến lên!
Nước non Việt Nam ta vững bền!

II
Đoàn quân Việt Nam đi, sao vàng phấp phới!
Dắt giống nòi quê hương qua nơi lầm than.
Cùng chung sức phấn đấu xây đời mới,
Đứng đều lên gông xích ta đập tan.
Từ bao lâu ta nuốt căm hờn,
Quyết hy sinh đời ta tươi thắm hơn.

Điệp khúc

IPA transcription (Northern)

I
[ʔɗwaːn˨˩ kwən˧ viət̚˧˨ʔ naːm˧ ʔɗi˧ t͡ɕʊwŋ͡m˧ lawŋ͡m˨˩ kɨw˧˦ kuək̚˧˦]
[ʔɓɯək̚˧˦ t͡ɕən˧ zon˨˩ vaːŋ˧ t͡ɕen˧ ʔɗɯəŋ˨˩ ɣəp̚˧˨ʔ ɣəjŋ̟˨˩ saː˧]
[kəː˨˩ ʔin˧ maw˧˦ t͡ɕiən˧˦ tʰaŋ˧˦ maːŋ˧ hon˨˩ nɯək̚˧˦]
[sʊwŋ͡m˧˦ ŋwaːj˨˩ saː˧ t͡ɕɛn˧ xʊwk͡p̚˧˦ kwən˧ hajŋ̟˨˩ kaː˧]
[ʔɗɯəŋ˨˩ vɨŋ̟˧ kwaːŋ˧ səj˧ saːk̚˧˦ kwən˧ tʰu˨˩]
[tʰaŋ˧˦ zaːn˧ laːw˧ kʊwŋ͡m˨˩ ɲaw˧ ləp̚˧˨ʔ t͡ɕiən˧˦ xu˧]

Chorus:
[vi˨˩ ɲən˧ zən˧ t͡ɕiən˧˦ ʔɗəw˧˦ xəwŋ͡m˧ ŋɯŋ˨˩]
[tiən˧˦ maw˧ zaː˧ saː˧ t͡ɕɯəŋ˨˩]
[tiən˧˦ len˧ kʊwŋ͡m˨˩ tiən˧˦ len˧]
[nɯək̚˧˦ nɔn˧ viət̚˧˨ʔ naːm˧ taː˧ vɯŋ˦ˀ˥ ʔɓen˨˩]

II
[ʔɗwaːn˨˩ kwən˧ viət̚˧˨ʔ naːm˧ ʔɗi˧ saːw˧ vaːŋ˨˩ faːp̚˧˦ fəːj˧˦]
[zat̚˧˦ zəwŋ͡m˧˦ nɔj˨˩ kwe˧ hɯəŋ˧ kwaː˧ nəːj˧ ləm˨˩ tʰaːn˧]
[kʊwŋ͡m˨˩ t͡ɕʊwŋ͡m˧ sɯk̚˧˦ fən˧˦ ʔɗəw˧˦ səj˧ ʔɗəːj˨˩ məːj˧˦]
[ʔɗɯŋ˧˦ ʔɗew˨˩ len˧ ɣəwŋ͡m˧ sɨk̟̚˧˦ taː˧ ʔɗəp̚˧˨ʔ taːn˧]
[tɯ˨˩ ʔɓaːw˧ ləw˧ taː˧ nuət̚˧˦ kam˧ həːn˨˩]
[kwiət̚˧˦ hi˧ sɨŋ̟˧ ʔɗəːj˨˩ taː˧ tɯəj˧ tʰam˧˦ həːn˧]

Chorus

English translation

I
Soldiers of Vietnam, we go forward, with the heart to save the nation.
Our hurried steps sound on the long and arduous road.
Our flag, red with the blood of victory, bears the spirit of our country.
The distant rumbling of gunfire mingles with our marching song.
The path to glory is built upon the bodies of our foes.
Overcoming all hardships, together we build our resistance bases.

Chorus:
Ceaselessly for the people's cause we struggle.
Hasten to the battlefield!
Advance! All advance!
Our Vietnam is eternally strong!

II
Soldiers of Vietnam, we go forward, the gold star of our flag fluttering in the wind.
Leading our people, our native land, out of misery and suffering.
Let us join our efforts in the fight for the building of a new life.
Let us stand up and break our chains.
For too long have we swallowed our hatred.
Let us keep ready for all sacrifices and our life will be radiant.

Chorus

== Copyright ==
=== Copyright of the lyrics and the music sheet ===
In 2010, Nghiêm Thúy Băng, the wife of late musician Văn Cao, addressed a letter to the Minister of Culture, Sports and Tourism of Vietnam proposing to donate the work "Tiến quân ca" into public domain. This was also the wish of Văn Cao.

However, in 2015, the family of Văn Cao, registered the song with the Vietnam Center for Protection of Music Copyright, demanding royalties for all public performances except in certain situations like schools and "important state ceremonies". Văn Cao's eldest son Văn Thao said that his family "never reached consensus on 'gifting' the song, so they authorized the center to collect royalties on his father's songs".

The copyright announcement has angered many veteran musicians. Nguyễn Quang Long says the "anthem must belong to the public, and people should be allowed to sing it without worrying about royalties". Singer Ánh Tuyết, who is best known for her performance of Cao's songs, agrees that the anthem "long ago became a song of the people, so it should be gifted to the people".

On 25 August 2015, the Ministry of Culture, Sports and Tourism sent an official letter to the music copyright agency to stop collecting royalties on "Tiến quân ca".

On 8 July 2016, Văn Thao confirmed that he and his family were going to donate the song to the nation as his father's last wish. A letter, signed by all the legal inheritors in the family, stated that the family would donate the song for free use.

On 15 July 2016, The National Assembly Office held a ceremony in Hanoi to receive the national anthem, donated by family members of Văn Cao, and to bestow the composer with the Ho Chi Minh Order. Also at the ceremony, Deputy Prime Minister Vũ Đức Đam presented a certificate of merit from the Prime Minister to Nghiêm Thúy Băng, the composer's widow, in recognition of her efforts in preserving the composer's works.

=== Copyright of different recording versions of the anthem ===
There are still disputes over the copyrights of each recording versions of the anthem, for example during the broadcasting the football match between Laos and Vietnam on 6 December 2021, the sound of anthem music was muted using the reason of copyrights. The copyright claims met with huge backlash from the author's family, the government, and other opinions who considered national anthem should be free for all. Opposite opinions claimed that although the lyric and music sheet of the anthem is free, it is legal to claim the copyright of specific recording versions of the anthem.

The Government then announced a "free" recording version of the national anthem which had been already published on the government website and emphasized that "Vietnamese laws strictly forbid the obstruction of popularizing the national anthem, directly or indirectly, under the regulation of rules and laws." The Department of Sports also issued an instruction called for the use of the "free" version published by the government. The "free" version was then used in subsequent sport events.

On 16 June 2022, the National Assembly of Vietnam passed the bill of "Amendments to some Articles of the Law on Intellectual property" related to "Tiến quân ca", in which Clause 2, Article 7 of the law was added to be:

"The exercise of intellectual property rights must not infringe the interests of the State, the public interest or the legitimate rights and interests of other organizations and individuals, and must not breach other relevant provisions of law. Organizations and individuals exercising intellectual property rights related to the National Flag, National Emblem, National Anthem of the Socialist Republic of Vietnam must not obstruct their use and dissemination." The amendments were set to become effective on 1 January 2023.

== See also ==
- Flag of Vietnam
- Giải phóng miền Nam or Liberate the South, the national anthem of the Provisional Revolutionary Government of the Republic of South Vietnam
