= Alliance of Arts and Literature Associations of Vietnam =

Vietnamese organization

The Alliance of Arts and Literature Associations of Vietnam (Liên hiệp các Hội Văn học nghệ thuật Việt Nam) is the senior official body representing all the culture associations in Vietnam.

== History ==
It was founded 1957–1958 as the bodies beneath it were also founded. The organization has is also known in English as the Vietnam Union of Literature and Arts Associations (VULAA). It has undergone several name changes throughout its existence: Vietnam Literature and Arts Association (1948 – 1957), Vietnam Union of Literature and Arts Associations (1957 - 1995), Union of Vietnamese Literature and Arts Associations (from 1995).

VULA is a member of the Vietnamese Fatherland Front.

== Notable members ==
=== Presidents ===
- 1957-1984: Đặng Thai Mai
- 1984-1995: Huy Cận
- 1995-2003: Nguyễn Đình Thi
- March 2003 - November 2003: Trần Hoàn
- 2004-2010: Vũ Giáng Hương
- 2010-2021: Hữu Thỉnh
- 2021-present: Đỗ Hồng Quân

== Constituent bodies ==
- Vietnam Writers' Association (Hội Nhà văn Việt Nam) - The association awards its own book prize each year. This is one of the official culture associations in Vietnam. It was founded 1957 under the Alliance of Arts and Literature Associations in Vietnam. The association awards its own book prize each year: the Vietnamese Writers Association Prize.
- Vietnam Fine Arts Association (Hội Mỹ thuật Việt Nam)
- Vietnam Musicians Association
- Vietnam Association of Theatre Artists
- Vietnam Cinema Association and Vietnamese Film Board
- Vietnam Association of Architects
- Vietnam Association of Dance Artists
- Folk Arts Association of Vietnam
- Literature and Art Association of Vietnamese Ethnic Minorities
- Vietnam Publishers Association
- Vietnam Association of Photographic Artists

The body does not include the Vietnam Journalists' Association.

== See also ==
- Literature in Vietnam
