= Văn Cao =

Vietnamese composer from Haiphong

- Born: Nguyễn Văn Cao; 15 November 1923; Hai Phong, Tonkin, French Indochina
- Died: 10 July 1995 (aged 71); Hanoi, Vietnam
- Education: Indochina College of Fine Arts (now Vietnam University of Fine Arts)
- Occupations: Composer, poet, painter
- Known for: Composing music
- Notable work: Tiến Quân Ca; Buồn tàn thu; Trường ca Sông Lô; Làng tôi (Văn Cao); Tiến về Hà Nội
- Spouse: Nghiêm Thúy Băng
- Children: Five children (3 boys, 2 girls, the eldest is Văn Thao)
- Awards: Order of Ho Chi Minh; First class Order of Resistance; First class Order of Independence; Third class Order of Independence

Văn Cao (born Nguyễn Văn Cao, Vietnamese pronunciation: [ŋʷjə̌ˀn van kaːw]; 15 November 1923 – 10 July 1995) was a Vietnamese composer whose works include Tiến Quân Ca, which became the national anthem of Vietnam. He, along with Phạm Duy and Trịnh Công Sơn, is widely considered one of the three most salient figures of 20th-century (non-classical) Vietnamese music.

Văn Cao was also a notable poet and a painter. In 1996, he was posthumously awarded the Hồ Chí Minh Prize for Music.

== Career ==
After the Nhân Văn–Giai Phẩm affair, a movement for political and cultural freedom in 1956, he had to stop composing. Most of his songs, except Tiến Quân Ca, Làng Tôi, Tiến Về Hà Nội, and Trường Ca Sông Lô were prohibited in North Vietnam.

All of his songs were once again authorized in Vietnam until after the Đổi Mới, 1987.

In 1992, the American composer Robert Ashley composed the solo piano piece Văn Cao's Meditation, which is based on a National Geographic magazine's image of Văn Cao playing his piano.

== Works ==
=== Songs ===
==== Love songs ====
- Buồn tàn thu (1939) ("Sadness at the end of autumn", the first song of Văn Cao)
- Suối mơ ("Dreamy stream")
- Thiên Thai (1941) ("Eden")
- Bến xuân (1942) ("Spring river dock", music by Văn Cao, lyric written together with Phạm Duy)
- Cung đàn xưa ("The old tune")
- Thu cô liêu ("The lonely autumn")
- Trương Chi (1943)
- Đàn chim Việt (1944) ("Vietnamese flock of birds" - rewritten lyric from Bến xuân)

==== Patriotic songs ====
- Bắc Sơn (1945) (song about Bắc Sơn Uprising, was originally written for the same name Bắc Sơn play of Nguyễn Huy Tưởng)
- Chiến sĩ Việt Nam (1945) ("Vietnamese soldiers")
- Trường ca Sông Lô (1948) ("Lô river epic", an epic to commemorate the success of Việt Minh in repelling the French in Operation Léa at Lô river)

==== March songs ====
- Tiến Quân Ca (1944) ("Army marching song", national anthem of Democratic Republic of Vietnam since 1946, then Socialist Republic of Vietnam since 1976)
- Bài ca Chiến sĩ Hải quân (1945) ("Song for marines")
- Hải quân Việt Nam hành khúc (1945) ("Vietnamese navy march")
- Không quân Việt Nam hành khúc (1945) ("Vietnamese air force march")
- Tiến về Hà Nội (March on Hanoi)
- Thăng Long hành khúc ca (Thang Long marching song)

==== Choir songs ====
- Hải Phòng mở ra biển lớn (197_)

==== Others ====
- Đêm sơn cước ("A night in the mountain")
- Gò Đống Đa (1942) ("Đống Đa Mound")
- Hò kéo gỗ Bạch Đằng Giang (1941)
- Làng tôi (1947) ("My Village")
- Mùa xuân đầu tiên (1976) ("The first spring" - after Reunification Day, his second song after 20 years nearly keeping silent)
- Ngày mai ("Tomorrow")
- Ngày mùa (1948) ("Harvest")
- Tình ca Trung du (1984) ("Trung du's love song", his last song)

=== Poems ===
- Anh có nghe thấy không (Feb 1956) ("Do you hear?". Published in Giai phẩm Spring)
- Lá (Văn Cao) (1988) ("Leaves", a collection of 28 poems composed during 1941–1987)
- Những người trên cửa biển (Spring 1956) ("People at the sea gate", an epic about people of Hải Phòng, printed together with Hoàng Cầm – Trần Dần – Lê Đạt in Cửa Biển poetry collection)

=== Paintings ===
- Cô gái dậy thì (Puberty girl)
- Thái Hà ấp đêm mưa (Rainy night in Thái Hà hamlet)
- Cuộc khiêu vũ của những người tự tử' (1944) ("Dance of the suicides")
