= Elvis Phương =

Vietnamese singer

- Born: Phạm Ngọc Phương; 1 February 1945 (age 81); Thủ Dầu Một, Bình Dương, French Indochina
- Genres: pop, rock

Elvis Phương (born Phạm Ngọc Phương; Thủ Dầu Một; 1 February 1945) is a Vietnamese singer.

== Life ==
Phương spent his youth in Saigon and became a popular performer in South Vietnam before having to leave following the fall of Saigon in 1975. In the 1990s, he started to take trips back to Vietnam on a regular basis, and again became a popular singer there. However, some Vietnamese refugee communities overseas were angered by his decision to perform in Vietnam and initially responded by boycotting and cancelling his performances.
