= Trịnh Công Sơn =

Background information
- Also known as: Trịnh
- Born: Trịnh Công Sơn; February 28, 1939
- Origin: Buôn Ma Thuột, Đắk Lắk Province, French Indochina
- Died: April 1, 2001 (aged 62) Ho Chi Minh City, Vietnam
- Instrument: Guitar
- Years active: 1958–2001

Trịnh Công Sơn (February 28, 1939 – April 1, 2001) was a Vietnamese musician, songwriter, painter and poet. He is widely considered to be Vietnam's greatest songwriter and one of the best-selling Vietnamese music artists of all time. His music explores themes of love, loss, and anti-war sentiments during the Vietnam War, for which he was censored by both the southern Republic of Vietnam and the Socialist Republic of Vietnam. Many performing artists, most notably Khánh Ly, Hồng Nhung, Trinh Vinh Trinh (his younger sister), and some overseas singers such as Tuan Ngoc, Le Quyen, Le Thu, and Ngoc Lan, have gained popularity in their own right from covering Sơn's songs.

== Biography ==
Trịnh Công Sơn was born in Buôn Ma Thuột, Đắk Lắk Province, French Indochina, but as a child he lived in the village of Minh Huong in Hương Trà in Thừa Thiên–Huế Province. He grew up in Huế, where he attended the Lycée Français and the Providence school. When he was ten he lived with his father in Huế's Thừa Phủ Prison for a year in 1949. Later he went to Saigon and studied western philosophy at the Lycée Jean-Jacques Rousseau, from which he graduated with the baccalaureate degree. In 1961, he studied psychology and pedagogy in a school for teachers in Qui Nhơn in an attempt to avoid being drafted into the Republic of Vietnam Military Forces. After graduation, he taught at an elementary school in Bao Loc, Lâm Đồng.

Trịnh Công Sơn wrote over 500 songs during the 1960s and 1970s. Sơn was influenced by the shrill demands of American anti-war protesters, which had been brought to Vietnam by none other than young American soldiers." He became one of South Vietnam's notable singer-songwriters, after his first hit, Ướt mi (Tearing Lashes) in 1958. He was frequently under pressure from the government, which was displeased with the pacifist's lyrics of such songs as Ngủ đi con (Lullaby, about a mother grieving for her soldier son).

Before April 30, 1975, Trịnh Công Sơn went on the radio in Saigon to sing the song "Joining Hands/Circle of Unity" ("Nối vòng tay lớn") about the dream of national reconciliation between the North and the South, which he had written in 1968. On the afternoon of April 30, following Dương Văn Minh's proclamation of surrender, Trinh went on the radio to say that the national dream had been realized and that liberation had been achieved.

After the reunification in 1975, the government sent Sơn to "retraining" in a labour camp after his family had fled to Canada. However, government and many officials sent their respects with floral tributes. His often melancholic songs about love and postwar reconciliation earned new acceptance and popularity in later years. Many of his songs have been re-licensed to Vietnamese music companies such as Thúy Nga and Lang Van and sung by other artists.

Two singers who are often associated with Trịnh Công Sơn are Khánh Ly and Hồng Nhung. Khánh Ly helped popularize Trịnh Công Sơn's music in the early years, and they often performed together at South Vietnam University campuses. Later in Sơn's life, singer Hồng Nhung (born 1970) re-popularized his music.

Sơn died on 1 April 2001, 62 years old. Hundreds of thousands of people gathered at his funeral in Ho Chi Minh City, for an ad hoc funeral concert, making it the largest spectacle in Vietnamese history, after the funeral procession of Ho Chi Minh.

On 28 February 2019, Google celebrated what would have been Trịnh Công Sơn's 80th birthday with a Google doodle.

== Songs ==
Till now (2025) according to Nguyễn Đăng Chương, director of the Performing Art department of the ministry of Culture, Sport and Tourism, 70 songs of Trịnh Công Sơn are allowed to be performed in public. The latest song, is Nối vòng tay lớn, on April 12, 2017.

=== List of songs ===
- Bài ca dành cho những xác người (Ballad to the people's corpses), written in the aftermath of the Huế Massacre
- Bên đời hiu quạnh (Alone by life's side)
- Biển nghìn thu ở lại
- Biển nhớ (The sea remembers)
- Biển sáng (Bright sea) (co-writing with Phạm Trọng Cầu)
- Biết đâu nguồn cội (Unbeknownst to me, the root)
- Bống bồng ơi
- Bống không là Bống
- Bốn mùa thay lá (Four seasons of change)
- Ca dao mẹ (A folk song for mothers)
- Cánh đồng hoà bình (The Field of peace)
- Cát bụi (Sand and dust)
- Chiếc lá thu phai (The withering fall leaf)
- Chiều một mình qua phố (An afternoon promenade of solitude)
- Chiều trên quê hương tôi (An afternoon in my homeland)
- Chỉ có ta trong cuộc đời (Only me in life)
- Chìm dưới cơn mưa (Sunk under the rain)
- Chính Chúng Ta Phải Nói (We ourselves have to say)
- Cho đời chút ơn (Grace onto life)
- Cho một người nằm xuống (Song for the fallen)
- Chờ nhìn quê hương sáng chói (Wait to see homeland brighten up)
- Chưa mất niềm tin (Still believing)
- Chưa mòn giấc mơ (A dream that hasn't been eroded)
- Con mắt còn lại (The remaining eye)
- Có một dòng sông đã qua đời (A river that has passed away)
- Có nghe đời nghiêng (Tilting life)
- Còn ai với ai / Còn tôi với ai
- Còn mãi tìm nhau (Forever seeking each other)
- Còn có bao ngày (Not many days are left)
- Còn thấy mặt người (Still seeing your face)
- Còn tuổi nào cho em (what time and age for you ?)
- Cỏ xót xa đưa (Sway sorrow weeds)
- Cúi xuống thật gần (Stoop down really close)
- Cũng sẽ chìm trôi (Eventual withering)
- Cuối cùng cho một tình yêu (The end of a romance)
- Dân ta phải sống (Our people must live)
- Dấu chân địa đàng / Tiếng hát dạ lan (Footprints in Eden / The singing of the Hyacinth)
- Diễm xưa (Diễm of the Past)
- Du mục (Nomad)
- Dựng lại người, dựng lại nhà (Rebuild people, rebuild homes)
- Đại bác ru đêm (A Lullaby of Cannons)
- Để gió cuốn đi (Let go with the wind)
- Đêm / Đêm Hồng (Night / Pink Night)
- Đêm bây giờ, đêm mai (This night, tomorrow night)
- Đêm thấy ta là thác đổ (One night I saw me as a waterfall)
- Đi mãi trên đường (Never-ending walk on the road)
- Đóa hoa vô thường (Evanescent bloom)
- Đoản khúc thu Hà Nội (Ditty for Hanoi's autumn)
- Đời cho ta thế (That's what life gives me)
- Đợi có một ngày (Waiting for a day)
- Đôi mắt nào mở ra (which eyes will open)
- Đồng dao hoà bình (The rhythm of Peace)
- Đừng mong ai, đừng nghi ngại (Don't expect or suspect anyone)
- Em còn nhớ hay em đã quên (Do you still remember or have you forgotten?)
- Em đã cho tôi bầu trời (The heaven you have brought to me)
- Em đến từ nghìn xưa (You've come from thousand years ago)
- Em đi bỏ lại con đường (You've gone, leaving the street behind)
- Em đi trong chiều (In the evening you walk)
- Em hãy ngủ đi (Sleep, My Dear)
- Em là hoa hồng nhỏ (You are a little rose)
- Gần như niềm tuyệt vọng (A resemblance of despair)
- Gia tài của mẹ (A mother's legacy)
- Giọt lệ thiên thu (A tear of eternity)
- Giọt nước mắt cho quê hương (A tear for my homeland)
- Gọi tên bốn mùa (Conjure up the four seasons)
- Góp lá mùa xuân (Contributing leaves to Spring)
- Hạ trắng (White summer).
- Hai mươi mùa nắng lạ (Twenty seasons of strange sunlight)
- Hành ca (Marching song)
- Hành hương trên đồi cao / Người đi hành hương trên đỉnh cao (Pilgrimage)
- Hát trên những xác người (Singing over the corpses), not to be confused with "Bài ca dành cho những xác người"
- Hãy cố chờ (Let's try to wait)
- Hãy cứ vui như mọi ngày (Just be happy like any other day)
- Hãy đi cùng nhau (Let's go together)
- Hãy khóc đi em (Just cry, my dear)
- Hãy nhìn lại (Just look back and see)
- Hãy sống giùm tôi (Just live my life for me)
- Hãy yêu nhau đi (Let's love)
- Hoà bình là cơm áo (Peace is life)
- Hoa vàng mấy độ (The flowers that were once golden bright)
- Hoa xuân ca (Spring flowers song)
- Hôm nay tôi nghe (Today I hear)
- Huế - Sài Gòn - Hà Nội (Hue - Saigon - Hanoi)
- Huyền thoại mẹ (The Legend of a mother)
- Khói trời mênh mông
- Lại gần với nhau (Come closer together)
- Lặng lẽ nơi này (So silent here)
- Lời buồn thánh (A holy, sad lyrics)
- Lời mẹ ru (A mother's lullaby)
- Lời ở phố về
- Lời ru đêm (Night's lullaby)
- Lời thiên thu gọi (Eternity's calling)
- Mẹ bỏ con đi / Đường xa vạn dặm
- Môi hồng đào (Rosy Lips)
- Mỗi ngày tôi chọn một niềm vui (Each day I choose one joyful thing)
- Một buổi sáng mùa xuân (A spring morning)
- Một cõi đi về (A place for leaving and returning)
- Một lần thoáng có
- Một ngày như mọi ngày (A day just like any other day)
- Một ngày vinh quang (A day of glory)
- Mùa áo quan (The season of coffins)
- Mùa hè đến (The summer's arrived)
- Mưa hồng (Pink rain)
- Mùa phục hồi / Xin chờ những sớm mai (The season of recuperation / Waiting for tomorrow mornings)
- Nắng thuỷ tinh (Crystal sunlight)
- Này em cớ nhớ (Do you remember?)
- Ngẫu nhiên (Perchance)
- Ngày dài trên quê hương (A long day in the Motherland)
- Ngày mai đây bình yên (Peaceful future)
- Ngày về (Returning home)
- Ngày xưa khi còn bé (Childhood days)
- Nghe những tàn phai (The sound of evanescing)
- Nghe tiếng muôn trùng (Hearing the sound of eternity)
- Ngủ đi con (Sleep, my child)
- Ngụ ngôn mùa đông (A winter fable)
- Người con gái Việt Nam da vàng (A yellow-skinned Vietnamese girl)
- Người già em bé (An old person, a baby)
- Người về bỗng nhớ
- Nguyệt ca (The lunar song)
- Nhìn những mùa thu đi (Watch the autumns passing by)
- Nhớ mùa thu Hà Nội (Missing Hanoi's autumn)
- Như cánh vạc bay (As a flying crane)
- Như chim ưu phiền (As an anguishing bird)
- Như một lời chia tay (As a good-bye)
- Như một vết thương (As a wound)
- Như tiếng thở dài (As a deep sigh)
- Những con mắt trần gian (The earthly eyes)
- Những giọt máu trổ bông (The blooming of the blood drops)
- Níu tay nghìn trùng (Grabbing hands over a thousand miles)
- Nối vòng tay lớn (Grand circle of unity)
- Ở trọ / Cõi tạm (Temporary stay)
- Phôi pha (Withering)
- Phúc âm buồn (Dolorous Gospel)
- Quê hương đau nặng (Motherland in severe illness)
- Quỳnh hương (Scent of the ephemeral bloom)
- Ra đồng giữa ngọ
- Rồi như đá ngây ngô (Not gone at all)
- Rơi lệ ru người
- Ru đời đã mất (Lullaby for a lost life)
- Ru đời đi nhé (Lullaby to life)
- Ru em (Lullaby for you)
- Ru em từng ngón xuân nồng
- Ru ta ngậm ngùi (Lullaby for a sorrowful me)
- Ru tình (Lullaby for love)
- Rừng xưa đã khép (Your old woods are closed)
- Sao mắt mẹ chưa vui?
- Sẽ còn ai (Who will remain?)
- Sóng về đâu (To where the waves depart)
- Ta đi dựng cờ
- Tạ ơn (Thanks)
- Ta phải thấy mặt trời (We must see the Sun)
- Ta quyết phải sống (We must live)
- Ta đã thấy gì trong đêm nay (What have we seen tonight?)
- Thành phố mùa xuân (City in Spring)
- Thuở Bống là người (When Bong was a human)
- Thiên sứ bâng khuâng (thơ Trịnh Cung)
- Thương một người (Loving someone)
- Tiến thoái lưỡng nan (The dilemma)
- Tình ca của người mất trí ("Ballad of an insane person" or "Love song of a deranged woman")
- Tiếng ve gọi hè
- Tình khúc Ơ-bai
- Tình nhớ (Missing love)
- Tình sầu (Sorrowful love)
- Tình xa (Distant love)
- Tình xót xa vừa
- Tình yêu tìm thấy
- Tôi đã mất (I have lost)
- Tôi đang lắng nghe / Im lặng thở dài (I am listening / Quiet sigh)
- Tôi ơi đừng tuyệt vọng (Despair not, dear me)
- Tôi ru em ngủ (I sing you to sleep)
- Tôi sẽ đi thăm (I shall visit)
- Tôi sẽ nhớ (I shall remember)
- Tôi tìm tôi / Tôi là ai? (I search for myself / Who am I?)
- Trong nỗi đau tình cờ
- Tự tình khúc
- Từng ngày qua (Everyday through)
- Tuổi đá buồn (Stone's age of despair)
- Tuổi đời mênh mông
- Tuổi trẻ Việt Nam (Vietnamese Youths)
- Tưởng rằng đã quên (Thought that I have forgotten)
- Ướt mi ("Misty eyes" or "Tearing lashes")
- Vẫn có em bên đời (I still have you in my life)
- Vẫn nhớ cuộc đời
- Vàng phai trước ngõ
- Về trong suối nguồn (Back to the fountainhead)
- Về thăm mái trường xưa (Revisiting the old school)
- Vết lăn trầm
- Vì tôi cần thấy em yêu đời
- Vườn xưa (Garden of the past)
- Xa dấu mặt trời (Far from the sun)
- Xanh lòng phai tàn
- Xin cho tôi (Please give me)
- Xin hãy dừng tay (Please stop)
- Xin mặt trời ngủ yên (Please let the sun sleep)
- Xin trả nợ người
- Yêu dấu tan theo (Fading love)

=== Songs about the Vietnam War ===
In the song "Mother's Legacy" (Gia tài của mẹ), Sơn sings about the Vietnamese experience of the Vietnam War: He laments that the 1,000 years of Vietnam's subjugation to Chinese imperial rule, the 100 years of subjugation to French colonial rule, and the ongoing civil war, together have left a sad legacy of graveyards, parched fields and burning houses. He urges the children of Vietnam to remain true to their Vietnamese identity and overcome the dividing hatred, put an end to internecine fighting and the destruction of the country.

In the song "Song about the Corpses of People" ("Hát trên những xác người"), written in the aftermath of the Huế Massacre, Sơn sings about the corpses strewn around the city, in the river, on the roads, on the rooftops, even on the porches of the pagodas. The corpses, each one of which he regards as the body of a sibling, will nourish the farmland.

A rock music concert event titled Nối Vòng Tay Lớn ("The Great Circle of Vietnam"); the name of a popular patriotic anti-war song by Trịnh Công Sơn, was officially promoted and held in Hồ Chí Minh City ostensibly as a memorial to Sơn, and featuring various Vietnamese rock bands and artists, had officially taken place for the first time on 22 April 2022.

=== Love songs ===
Love is the single biggest recurring theme in Sơn's work. His love songs constitute the majority of the songs. Most of them are sad, conveying a sense of despondence and solitude as in "Sương đêm", "Ướt mi". Songs are either about loss as in "Diểm xưa", "Biển nhớ", or nostalgia: "Tình xa", "Tình sầu", "Tình nhớ", "Em còn nhớ hay em đã quên", "Hoa vàng mấy độ". Other songs, additionally carry philosophical messages from a man to his lover: "Cỏ xót xa đưa", "Gọi tên bốn mùa", "Mưa hồng". The style is sly, simple, suitable to be rendered in Slow, Blues or Boston. The lyrics are overwhelmingly poetic, candid and yet deeply poignant, oftentimes hinting elements of symbolism and surrealism.
