= The Voice of Vietnam season 5 =

The Voice of Vietnam
- Season 5
- Hosted by: Phí Linh; Ali Hoàng Dương (backstage, Blind audition)
- Judges: Thu Phương; Lam Trường; Tóc Tiên; Noo Phước Thịnh
- Winner: Trần Ngọc Ánh
- Winning coach: Noo Phước Thịnh
- Runner-up: Đặng Thị Thái Bình

Release
- Original network: VTV3
- Original release: May 20 – September 2, 2018

Season chronology
- ← Previous; Season 4 Next → Season 6

The fifth season of The Voice of Vietnam began on May 20, 2018. The coaching panel this season consists of returning coaches Thu Phương, Tóc Tiên, Noo Phước Thịnh; and former The Voice Kids coach Lam Trường.

This season was won by Trần Ngọc Ánh from team Noo Phước Thịnh. With her victory, Trần Ngọc Ánh became the first wildcard act to win the competition in the history of The Voice of Vietnam, and overall, the second wildcard act to win among all The Voice versions worldwide (the first was Anja Nissen of The Voice Australia). Also for the first time, the final 4 were all female.

== Coaches and hosts ==
The Voice of Vietnam season 5 coaches

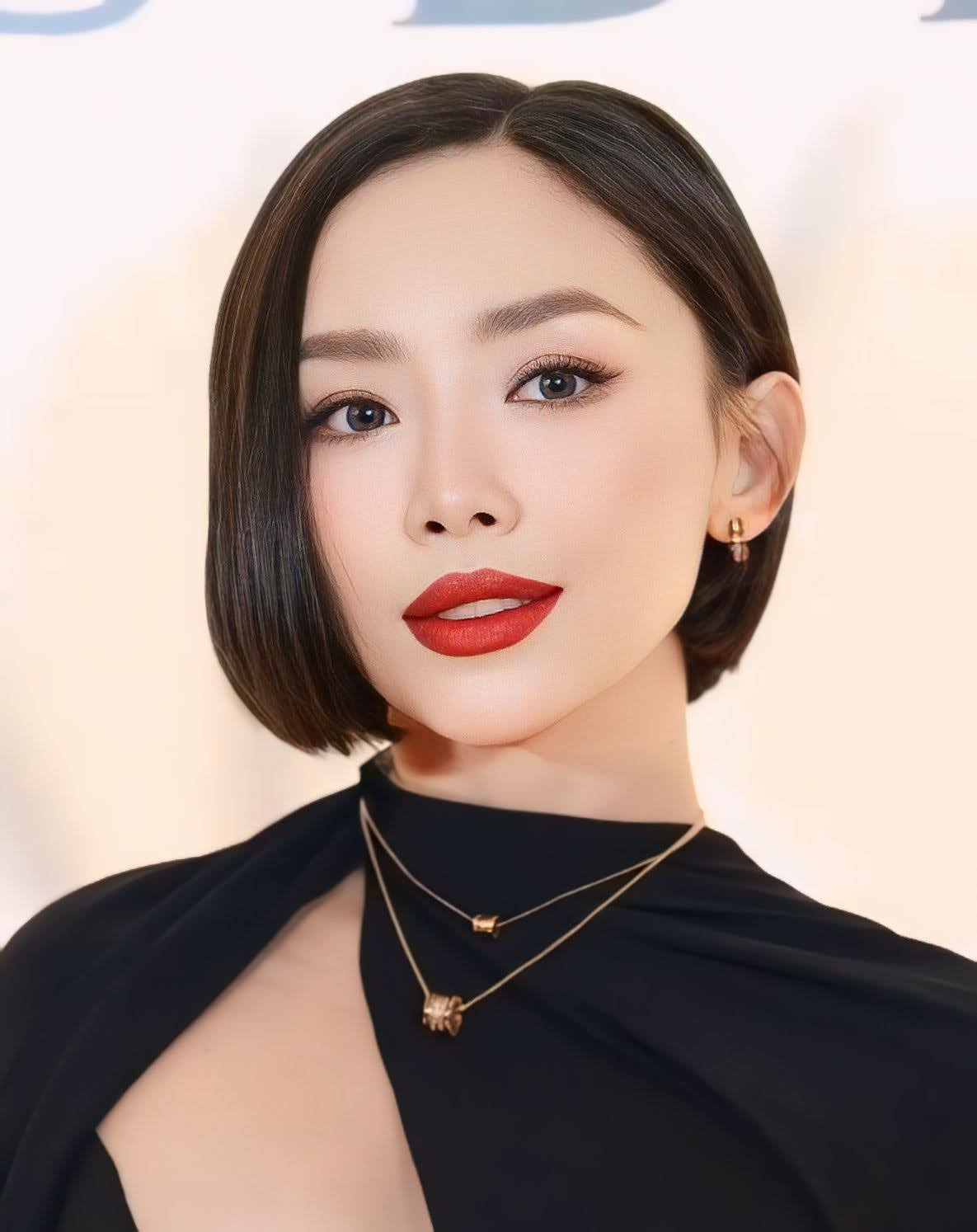
Tóc Tiên

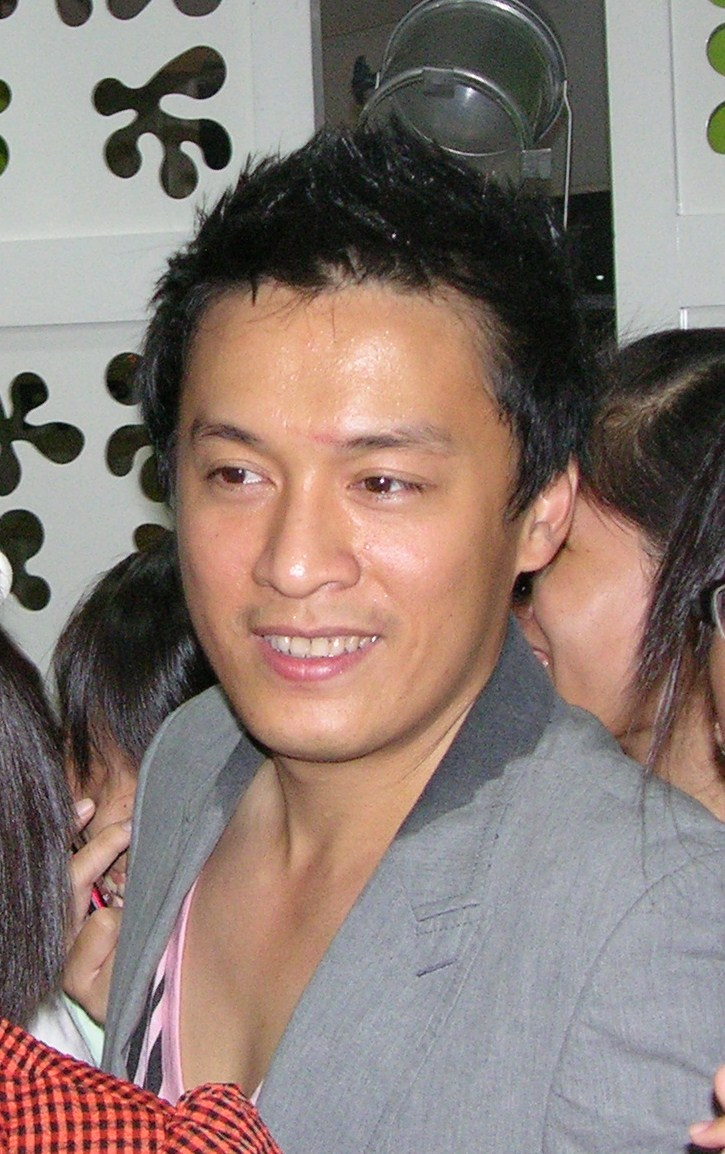
Lam Trường

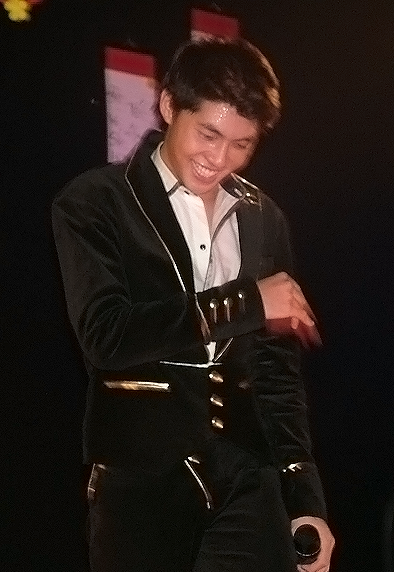
Noo Phước Thịnh

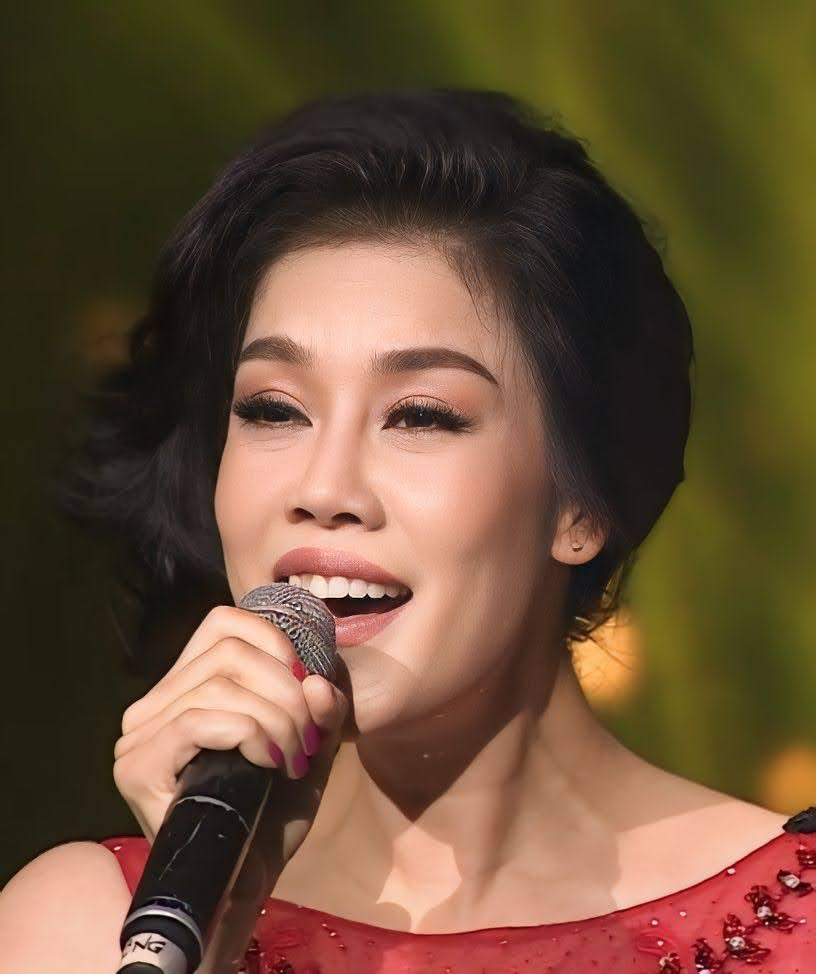
Thu Phương

The coaching panel saw two changes from the previous season as it was revealed on April 6, 2018. Noo Phước Thịnh and Tóc Tiên returned for their second season as coaches. Thu Phương returned to the panel after one season hiatus, replacing Thu Minh; while former The Voice Kids coach Lam Trường joined the show as a new coach, replacing Đông Nhi. Meanwhile, former Sing My Song presenter Phí Linh replaced Nguyên Khang as the show's new host. Last season's winner, Ali Hoàng Dương, served as the backstage presenter during the Blind auditions.

The blind audition this season adopted the "Block" twist from the fourteenth season of the U.S version, which prevents a coach from getting an artist if they turn their chairs. The team sizes were reduced to 10 per team.

== Teams ==
Color key

- Winner
- Runner-up
- Third place
- Fourth place
- Fifth place
- Eliminated in the Live shows
- Eliminated in the Knockout rounds
- Eliminated in the Battle rounds
- Stolen in the Battle rounds
- Disqualified from the competition
- Withdrew

Coach	Top 40 Artists					
Thu Phương						
Thu Phương	Nguyễn Thị Thu Ngân	Huỳnh Thanh Thảo	Đỗ Thành Nghiệp	Đặng Thị Mỹ Hằng	Đỗ Phương Thảo	Phan Hằng My
Thu Phương	Việt Puzo	Đào Bình Nhi	Nguyễn Thị Hà Thương	Bùi Đình Hoài Sa	An Duy	~~Sim Chanponloue~~
Lam Trường						
Lam Trường	Dương Quốc Anh	Huỳnh Phương Duy	Nguyễn Vũ Đoan Trang	Vũ Đức Mạnh	An Nhiên & Kiều Trang	Nguyễn Hương Giang
Lam Trường	Hoàng Xuân Quỳnh	Triệu Thiên Bình	Nguyễn Minh Tân	~~Đỗ Thành Nghiệp~~	~~Nguyễn Kiều Oanh~~	
Tóc Tiên						
Tóc Tiên	Đặng Thị Thái Bình	Lưu Hiền Trinh	Lê Chánh Tín	Avin Lu & Y Lux	Dư Khôi Nguyên	Nguyễn Hoàng Hải Vy
Tóc Tiên	Sim Chanponloue	Hoàng Tùng Anh	Trần Duy Anh	~~Nguyễn Vũ Đoan Trang~~	~~Vũ Phụng Tiên~~	
Noo Phước Thịnh						
Noo Phước Thịnh	Trần Ngọc Ánh	Trần Gia Nghi	Nguyễn Minh Ngọc	Đức Tâm & Hoàng Dương	Nguyễn Kiều Oanh	Huỳnh Samuel An
Noo Phước Thịnh	Vũ Phụng Tiên	~~Dư Khôi Nguyên~~	~~Hoàng Xuân Quỳnh~~	~~Đỗ Phương Thảo~~	Hoàng Mạnh	
Note: Italicised names are stolen artists (names struck through within former teams). Underlined names are a duo after Battle round.

== Blind auditions ==
The Blind auditions were taped on April 18 and 19, 2018, and were broadcast from May 20 to June 17.

Color key

Coach hit his or her "TÔI CHỌN BẠN" (I WANT YOU) button
Artist defaulted to a coach's team
Artist elected a coach's team
Artist was eliminated with no coach pressing their button
Coach pressed the "I WANT YOU" button, but was blocked by Thu Phương from getting the artist
Coach pressed the "I WANT YOU" button, but was blocked by Lam Trường from getting the artist
Coach pressed the "I WANT YOU" button, but was blocked by Tóc Tiên from getting the artist
Coach pressed the "I WANT YOU" button, but was blocked by Noo Phước Thịnh from getting the artist (Note: Noo Phước Thịnh did not block any other coaches.)

=== Episode 1 (May 20) ===
Order	Artist	Age	Hometown	Song	Coaches and artists choices			
Order	Artist	Age	Hometown	Song	Thu Phương	Lam Trường	Tóc Tiên	Noo
1	Trần Duy Khang	21	Hà Nam	"Can't Feel My Face" - The Weeknd	—	—	—	—
2	Đỗ Thành Nghiệp	21	Kiên Giang	"Ta còn yêu nhau" - Đức Phúc			—	—
3	Nguyễn Hoàng Hải Vy	21	Ho Chi Minh City	"Havana" - Camila Cabello	—			
4	Hà Đức Tâm	20	Nghệ An	"Walk away" - Vũ Thảo My	—	—	—	
5	Lý Kim Dung	N/A	N/A	"Mặt trời của em" - Phương Ly ft. Justa Tee	—	—	—	—
6	Nguyễn Việt Trinh	N/A	N/A	"Let me feel your love tonight" - Rhymastic	—	—	—	—
7	Bùi Đình Hoài Sa	—N/a	An Giang	"Summertime Sadness" - Lana Del Rey		—	—	—
8	An Nhiên	—N/a	Hà Tĩnh	"Ánh nắng của anh" - Đức Phúc	—		—	—
9	Trần Duy Anh	22	Hanoi	"Xin đừng lặng im" - Soobin Hoàng Sơn	—	—		—
10	Phạm Thị Ánh Tuyết	N/A	N/A	"All Falls Down" - Alan Walker ft. Noah Cyrus	—	—	—	—
11	Nguyễn Thị Hà Thương	—N/a	Nghệ An	"Ta chẳng còn ai" - Phương Thanh				
12	Trần Ngọc Ánh	23	Vĩnh Phúc	"Nâng được thì buông được" - Lưu Thiên Hương				

=== Episode 2 (May 27) ===
Order	Artist	Age	Hometown	Song	Coaches and artists choices			
Order	Artist	Age	Hometown	Song	Thu Phương	Lam Trường	Tóc Tiên	Noo
1	Đỗ Hoàng Dương	18	Hanoi	"Ghen" - Erik, Min, Khắc Hưng	—	—	—	
2	Đặng Thị Mỹ Hằng	24	Đồng Tháp	"Cánh hoa tàn" - Hương Tràm				
3	Đào Bình Nhi	24	Hai Phong	"Skyscraper" - Demi Lovato		—		—
4	Seo JongSeong	N/A	South Korea	"Em gái mưa" - Hương Tràm with Korean lyrics	—	—	—	—
5	Hoàng Xuân Quỳnh	—N/a	Phú Thọ	"Chạm khẽ tim anh một chút thôi" - Noo Phước Thịnh	—	—	—	
6	Dương Quốc Anh	—N/a	Ho Chi Minh City	"Đừng xin lỗi nữa" - Min & Erik				—
7	Lưu Hiền Trinh	—N/a	Hai Phong	"Walk Away" - Tóc Tiên				
8	Avin Lu (Lương Anh Vũ)	22	Lạng Sơn	"Đường một chiều" - Huỳnh Tú ft. Magazine	—	—		
9	Vũ Quang Thiện	N/A	N/A	"Phút cuối" - Lam Phương	—	—	—	—
10	Phạm Hương Giang	N/A	N/A	"Xin anh đừng" - Đông Nhi	—	—	—	—
11	Đỗ Mỹ Linh	N/A	N/A	"Sáng tối" - Phạm Toàn Thắng	—	—	—	—
12	Nguyễn Thị Thu Ngân	20	Nghệ An	"Come Back Home" - Vũ Cát Tường				

=== Episode 3 (June 3) ===
Order	Artist	Age	Hometown	Song	Coaches and artists choices			
Order	Artist	Age	Hometown	Song	Thu Phương	Lam Trường	Tóc Tiên	Noo
1	Sim Chanponloue	—N/a	Cambodia	"Hương à!" - Đình Khương (Sing My Song)		—		—
2	Nguyễn Vũ Đoan Trang	23	Thái Bình	"Black Widow" - Iggy Azalea & Rita Ora	—			—
3	Y Lux	23	Kon Tum	"Buông" - Bùi Anh Tuấn		—		—
4	Trần Thị Mỹ Lệ	23	N/A	"Đâu chỉ riêng em" - Mỹ Tâm	—	—	—	—
5	Vũ Đức Mạnh	24	Quảng Ninh	"Chờ cơn mưa" - Rocker Nguyễn	—		—	—
6	Lê Chánh Tín	—N/a	Vĩnh Long	"Chuyện của mùa đông" - Hà Anh Tuấn				
7	Nguyễn Hương Giang	27	Hanoi	"Người lạ ơi" - Karik & Orange	—			_{1}
8	Đặng Thị Thái Bình	18	Da Nang	"Chắc anh đang" - Tiên Tiên				
9	Đinh Như Quỳnh	N/A	N/A	"Million Reasons" - Lady Gaga	—	—	—	—
10	Trần Thanh Tùng	N/A	N/A	"Đi rồi sẽ đến" - Erik	—	—	—	—
11	Hồ Bảo Thái	N/A	N/A	"Thấy là yêu thương" - OnlyC	—	—	—	—
12	Huỳnh Samuel An	24	Switzerland	"La Vie en rose" - Edith Piaf				

_{1} Tóc Tiên pressed Noo's button.

=== Episode 4 (June 10) ===
Order	Artist	Age	Hometown	Song	Coaches and artists choices			
Order	Artist	Age	Hometown	Song	Thu Phương	Lam Trường	Tóc Tiên	Noo
1	Phan Hằng My	25	Quảng Trị	"Tan bao giấc mơ" - Mỹ Lệ		—	—	—
2	Đỗ Thụy Hoàng Oanh	N/A	N/A	"If I Were a Boy" - Beyoncé	—	—	—	—
3	Huỳnh Thanh Thảo	—N/a	—N/a	"Hello" - Lionel Richie				
4	Triệu Thiên Bình	26	Hanoi	"Yếu đuối" - Nguyễn Hoàng Dũng	—		—	—
5	Trần Văn Điền Minh	N/A	N/A	"Đừng lừa dối" - Lam Trường	—	—	—	—
6	Nguyễn Phạm Mạnh Hiển	N/A	Ho Chi Minh City	"Mắt buồn" - Thu Phương	—	—	—	—
7	Trần Gia Nghi	18	An Giang	"Never Be the Same" - Camila Cabello				
8	Vũ Phụng Tiên	19	Khánh Hòa	"Fight Song" - Rachel Platten	—			—
9	Huỳnh Phương Duy	—N/a	Kiên Giang	"Versace on the Floor" - Bruno Mars	—			
10	Nguyễn Minh Tân	—N/a	Bạc Liêu	"Don't You Go" - Vũ Cát Tường	—		—	—
11	Ngô Thị Huyền Trang	24	Quảng Ngãi	"Sa mạc tình yêu" - Lệ Quyên	—	—	—	—
12	Nguyễn Kiều Oanh	23	Đồng Tháp	"Đừng yêu" - Thu Minh				

=== Episode 5 (June 17) ===
Order	Artist	Age	Hometown	Song	Coaches and artists choices			
Order	Artist	Age	Hometown	Song	Thu Phương	Lam Trường	Tóc Tiên	Noo
1	An Duy	20	Hanoi	"Quá khứ còn lại gì" - Rocker Nguyễn		—	—	—
2	Tô Nguyễn Hoàng Lâm	N/A	N/A	"Let Her Go" - Ali Hoàng Dương	—	—	—	—
3	Lê Diễm Quỳnh	N/A	N/A	"Rời" - Vũ Ngọc Bích	—	—	—	—
4	Đỗ Phương Thảo	23	Hai Phong	"Too Good at Goodbyes" - Sam Smith				
5	Hoàng Mạnh	30	Da Nang	"Nụ hôn cuối" - Lưu Hương Giang	—		—	
6	Ngô Anh Kha	24	Quảng Ngãi	'Ngồi hát đỡ buồn" - Trúc Nhân	—	—	—	—
7	Nguyễn Minh Ngọc	25	Hanoi	"Never Enough" - Loren Allred				
8	Hiền Anh	21	Hanoi	"Talk to Me (Có nên dừng lại)" - Chi Pu	—	—	—	—
9	Hoàng Tùng Anh	21	Thanh Hóa	"Chí Phèo" - Bùi Công Nam (Sing My Song)		—		—
10	Dư Khôi Nguyên	21	Ho Chi Minh City	"Treat You Better" - Shawn Mendes	—	—	Team full	
11	Hoàng Kiều Trang	21	Hanoi	"Người đứng xem" - Mew Amazing			Team full	Team full
12	Việt Puzo (Vũ Tiến Việt)	—N/a	Hai Phong	"Ngại ngùng" - Hương Tràm		Team full	Team full	Team full

== The Battles ==
The Battle round was taped on June 4, 2018 and was broadcast from June 24 to July 15, 2018. The Battles' advisors for this season are: music producer Dương Cầm for team Thu Phương, former Sing My Song judges Nguyễn Hải Phong and Hồ Hoài Anh for team Lam Trường and Noo Phước Thịnh respectively, and diva Trần Thu Hà for team Tóc Tiên. Each coach can steal two losing artists from other coaches' teams, as previously applied in season 3. However, in a new twist, a "double-pick" is given to each team to save both contestants in a pairing under the condition that they would become a duo for the rest of the competition.

Hoàng Mạnh from team Noo Phước Thịnh was disqualified from the competition prior to the Battle taping day due to his undisciplined behavior during the rehearsal process. As a result, Noo Phước Thịnh grouped three of his artists into one battle, with two advanced and one eliminated.

Color key:

Artist won the Battle and advanced to the Knockouts
Artist lost the Battle but was stolen by another coach and advanced to the Knockouts
Artist lost the Battle and was eliminated

Episode	Coach	Order	Winner	Song	Loser	'Steal' result			
Episode	Coach	Order	Winner	Song	Loser	Thu Phương	Lam Trường	Tóc Tiên	Noo
Episode 6 (June 24, 2018)	Thu Phương	1	Huỳnh Thanh Thảo	"Mê muội" - Bùi Lan Hương/ "Rơi" - Hoàng Thùy Linh (Mashup)	Bùi Đình Hoài Sa	—N/a	—	—	—
Episode 6 (June 24, 2018)	Noo Phước Thịnh	2	Hà Đức Tâm & Đỗ Hoàng Dương_{1}	"LALALA"/ "I Know You Know" - Soobin Hoàng Sơn/ "Cơn mơ ngọt ngào" - Thiều Bảo Trâm/ "Can't Stop the Feeling!" - Justin Timberlake (Mashup)	N/A (double pick)	—N/a	—N/a	—N/a	—N/a
Episode 6 (June 24, 2018)	Tóc Tiên	3	Lưu Hiền Trinh	"Chạy" - Phùng Khánh Linh	Nguyễn Vũ Đoan Trang			—N/a	—
Episode 6 (June 24, 2018)	Lam Trường	4	Vũ Đức Mạnh	"Với em là mãi mãi" - Hương Tràm	Nguyễn Kiều Oanh	—	—N/a	—	
Episode 7 (July 1, 2018)	Noo Phước Thịnh	1	Huỳnh Samuel An	"Từ ngày em đến" - Da Lab	Dư Khôi Nguyên	—	—		—N/a
Episode 7 (July 1, 2018)	Lam Trường	2	An Nhiên & Hoàng Kiều Trang_{2}	"Mơ" - Vũ Cát Tường	N/A (double pick)	—N/a	—N/a	—N/a	—N/a
Episode 7 (July 1, 2018)	Lam Trường	3	Dương Quốc Anh	"Sau tất cả" - Erik	Nguyễn Minh Tân	—	—N/a	—	—
Episode 7 (July 1, 2018)	Tóc Tiên	4	Lê Chánh Tín	"Em không là duy nhất" - Tóc Tiên	Hoàng Tùng Anh	—	—	—N/a	—
Episode 7 (July 1, 2018)	Thu Phương	5	Phan Hằng My	"Nghe này ai ơi" - Bùi Công Nam (Sing My Song)/ "Nơi này có anh" - Sơn Tùng M-TP (Mashup)	Sim Chanponloue	—N/a	—		—
Episode 8 (July 8, 2018)	Tóc Tiên	1	Avin Lu & Y Lux	"Tình yêu tôi hát" - Bằng Kiều, Trần Thu Hà	N/A (double pick)	—N/a	—N/a	Team full	—N/a
Episode 8 (July 8, 2018)	Lam Trường	2	Nguyễn Hương Giang	"Tiền đâu mua được" - Khắc Hưng	Triệu Thiên Bình	—	—N/a	Team full	—
Episode 8 (July 8, 2018)	Tóc Tiên	3	Đặng Thị Thái Bình	"Có em chờ" - Min, Mr. A/ "Con đường hạnh phúc" - Thùy Chi (Mashup)	Vũ Phụng Tiên	—	—	Team full	
Episode 8 (July 8, 2018)	Thu Phương	4	Nguyễn Thị Thu Ngân	"Tập làm mưa" - Tường Vy (Sing My Song)/ "Anh" - Hồ Quỳnh Hương (Mashup)	Nguyễn Thị Hà Thương	—N/a	—	Team full	Team full
Episode 8 (July 8, 2018)	Noo Phước Thịnh	5	Nguyễn Minh Ngọc	"Lâu đài cát" - Văn Mai Hương	Đỗ Phương Thảo		—	Team full	Team full
Episode 8 (July 8, 2018)	Noo Phước Thịnh	5	Trần Gia Nghi	"Lâu đài cát" - Văn Mai Hương	Đỗ Phương Thảo		—	Team full	Team full
Episode 9 (July 15, 2018)	Tóc Tiên	1	Nguyễn Hoàng Hải Vy	"Anh tin mình đã cho nhau một kỷ niệm" - Lương Bằng Quang ft Thu Thủy	Trần Duy Anh	—	—	Team full	Team full
Episode 9 (July 15, 2018)	Noo Phước Thịnh	2	Trần Ngọc Ánh	"Em tôi" - Thanh Lam/ "Ai khổ vì ai" - Thanh Sơn (Mashup)	Hoàng Xuân Quỳnh	—		Team full	Team full
Episode 9 (July 15, 2018)	Thu Phương	3	Đào Bình Nhi & Việt Puzo	"Sao anh vẫn chờ" - Hương Tràm/ "Tình về nơi đâu" - Thanh Bui (Mashup)	N/A (double pick)	—N/a	Team full	Team full	Team full
Episode 9 (July 15, 2018)	Thu Phương	4	Đặng Thị Mỹ Hằng	"Em ngày xưa khác rồi" - Hiền Hồ/ "Đừng ai nhắc về anh ấy" - Trà My Idol (Mashup)	An Duy	—N/a	Team full	Team full	Team full
Episode 9 (July 15, 2018)	Lam Trường	5	Huỳnh Phương Duy	"Có chàng trai viết lên cây"/ "Ai cũng có ngày xưa - Phan Mạnh Quỳnh (Mashup)	Đỗ Thành Nghiệp		Team full	Team full	Team full

_{1}Referred in short as Đức Tâm & Hoàng Dương for the rest of the competition.
_{2}Referred in short as An Nhiên & Kiều Trang for the rest of the competition.

== The Knockouts/ The Cross Battles ==
The Knockouts was taped on June 27 and broadcast from July 22 to August 5, 2018. For the first time in the show's history as well as The Voice franchise, the Knockouts would not be team-based but instead feature battles between members in different teams. Contestants from all four teams were paired randomly into one knockout battle, with the winner advanced to the Playoffs and the loser sent home. Each coach had three turns to "challenge" the other three coaches for a cross knockout battle. The challenge coach was allowed to select his/her own team member in a battle, and the chosen contestant would pick his/her knockout opponent randomly from the challenged coach's team. When there is only one contestant left in each team, the power to challenge other coaches would be granted to the coach with the highest number of winning battle.

After two performances in a battle concluded, a 21-member professional jury gave their points to each contestant publicly, whereas audience in the studio also voted for the two contestants. Those numbers were then added up to a total point to determine the winner of a knockout battle. As a result, the number of contestants advanced to the Playoff round between four teams would vary depending on the number of wins or losses of the team in the knockout battles. The "steal" was also not available as this stage of the competition this season.

Đào Bình Nhi, a contestant from team Thu Phương who was paired up with Việt Puzo into a duo in the Battle round, withdrew for personal reasons. Therefore, Việt Puzo competed in this round as a solo contestant.

Color key:

Artist won the Knockout and advanced to the Playoffs
Artist lost the Knockout and was eliminated

Episode	Order	Challenge team				Jury/ Public vote %		Challenged team			
Episode	Order	Coach	Song	Contestant	Total	Jury/ Public vote %		Total	Contestant	Song	Coach
Episode 10 (Sunday, July 22)	1	Lam Trường	"Giờ anh đã yêu" - Đoàn Thế Lân (Note: Đoàn Thế Lân, who was on Lam Trường's team on the second season of The Voice Kids, attended and gave advice to Dương Quốc Anh during rehearsals.)	Dương Quốc Anh	147.14%	58.33% (14/21)	41.67% (10/21)	52.86%	Việt Puzo	"Tái bút: Anh yêu em" - Phạm Toàn Thắng	Thu Phương
Episode 10 (Sunday, July 22)	1	Lam Trường	"Giờ anh đã yêu" - Đoàn Thế Lân	Dương Quốc Anh	147.14%	88.81%	11.19%	52.86%	Việt Puzo	"Tái bút: Anh yêu em" - Phạm Toàn Thắng	Thu Phương
Episode 10 (Sunday, July 22)	2	Tóc Tiên	"Yêu xa" - Vũ Cát Tường (Note: Vũ Cát Tường attended and gave advice to Lê Chánh Tín during rehearsals.)	Lê Chánh Tín	126.34%	70% (7/21)	30% (3/21)	73.66%	Hoàng Xuân Quỳnh	"Nấc Thang Lên Thiên Đường" - Bằng Kiều	Lam Trường
Episode 10 (Sunday, July 22)	2	Tóc Tiên	"Yêu xa" - Vũ Cát Tường	Lê Chánh Tín	126.34%	56.34%	43.66%	73.66%	Hoàng Xuân Quỳnh	"Nấc Thang Lên Thiên Đường" - Bằng Kiều	Lam Trường
Episode 10 (Sunday, July 22)	3	Thu Phương	"Anh và anh" - Vũ Cát Tường	Phan Hằng My	83.92%	45.71% (16/21)	54.29% (19/21)	116.08%	Trần Gia Nghi	"Hôm nay tôi buồn"- Phùng Khánh Linh (Note: Phùng Khánh Linh, who was on Thu Phương's team on the third season of The Voice of Vietnam, attended and gave advice to Trần Gia Nghi during rehearsals.)	Noo Phước Thịnh
Episode 10 (Sunday, July 22)	3	Thu Phương	"Anh và anh" - Vũ Cát Tường	Phan Hằng My	83.92%	38.21%	61.79%	116.08%	Trần Gia Nghi	"Hôm nay tôi buồn"- Phùng Khánh Linh	Noo Phước Thịnh
Episode 10 (Sunday, July 22)	4	Noo Phước Thịnh	"Còn nơi đó chờ em" - Đông Nhi	Trần Ngọc Ánh	145.37%	68% (17/21)	32% (8/21)	54.63%	Sim Chanponloue	"Tắt đèn" - Isaac	Tóc Tiên
Episode 10 (Sunday, July 22)	4	Noo Phước Thịnh	"Còn nơi đó chờ em" - Đông Nhi	Trần Ngọc Ánh	145.37%	77.37%	22.63%	54.63%	Sim Chanponloue	"Tắt đèn" - Isaac	Tóc Tiên
Episode 11 (Sunday, July 29)	1	Lam Trường	"Ain't Nobody" - Chaka Khan	Nguyễn Vũ Đoan Trang	127.59%	48.39% (15/21)	51.61% (16/21)	72.41%	Huỳnh Samuel An	"Cô gái M52" - HuyR & Tùng Viu	Noo Phước Thịnh
Episode 11 (Sunday, July 29)	1	Lam Trường	"Ain't Nobody" - Chaka Khan	Nguyễn Vũ Đoan Trang	127.59%	79.2%	20.8%	72.41%	Huỳnh Samuel An	"Cô gái M52" - HuyR & Tùng Viu	Noo Phước Thịnh
Episode 11 (Sunday, July 29)	2	Tóc Tiên	"Look What You Made Me Do" - Taylor Swift	Nguyễn Hoàng Hải Vy	87.71%	51.35% (19/21)	48.65% (18/21)	112.29%	Đặng Thị Mỹ Hằng	"Chờ người nơi ấy"- Uyên Linh	Thu Phương
Episode 11 (Sunday, July 29)	2	Tóc Tiên	"Look What You Made Me Do" - Taylor Swift	Nguyễn Hoàng Hải Vy	87.71%	36.36%	63.64%	112.29%	Đặng Thị Mỹ Hằng	"Chờ người nơi ấy"- Uyên Linh	Thu Phương
Episode 11 (Sunday, July 29)	3	Tóc Tiên	"Anh, thế giới và em" - Hương Tràm (Note: Phan Mạnh Quỳnh (the author of the song) attended and gave advice to Đặng Thị Thái Bình during rehearsals.)	Đặng Thị Thái Bình	102.49%	51.61% (16/21)	48.39% (15/21)	97.51%	Vũ Phụng Tiên	"Đại lộ tan vỡ" - Uyên Linh	Noo Phước Thịnh
Episode 11 (Sunday, July 29)	3	Tóc Tiên	"Anh, thế giới và em" - Hương Tràm	Đặng Thị Thái Bình	102.49%	50.88%	49.12%	97.51%	Vũ Phụng Tiên	"Đại lộ tan vỡ" - Uyên Linh	Noo Phước Thịnh
Episode 11 (Sunday, July 29)	4	Thu Phương	"Ashes" - Celine Dion	Huỳnh Thanh Thảo	113.68%	60% (18/21)	40% (12/21)	86.32%	Nguyễn Hương Giang	"Khi Xưa Ta Bé (Bang Bang)" - Cher	Lam Trường
Episode 11 (Sunday, July 29)	4	Thu Phương	"Ashes" - Celine Dion	Huỳnh Thanh Thảo	113.68%	53.68%	46.32%	86.32%	Nguyễn Hương Giang	"Khi Xưa Ta Bé (Bang Bang)" - Cher	Lam Trường
Episode 11 (Sunday, July 29)	5	Noo Phước Thịnh	"My Heart Will Go On" - Celine Dion	Nguyễn Minh Ngọc	114.75%	60.61% (20/21)	39.39% (13/21)	85.25%	Đỗ Phương Thảo	"Keep Me In Love" - Hồ Ngọc Hà	Thu Phương
Episode 11 (Sunday, July 29)	5	Noo Phước Thịnh	"My Heart Will Go On" - Celine Dion	Nguyễn Minh Ngọc	114.75%	54.14%	45.86%	85.25%	Đỗ Phương Thảo	"Keep Me In Love" - Hồ Ngọc Hà	Thu Phương
Episode 12 (Sunday, August 5)	1	Lam Trường	"Mãi mãi (Forever)" - Lam Trường	Vũ Đức Mạnh	75.13%	28.57% (8/21)	71.43% (20/21)	124.87%	Lưu Hiền Trinh	"Buông"- Bùi Anh Tuấn	Tóc Tiên
Episode 12 (Sunday, August 5)	1	Lam Trường	"Mãi mãi (Forever)" - Lam Trường	Vũ Đức Mạnh	75.13%	46.56%	53.44%	124.87%	Lưu Hiền Trinh	"Buông"- Bùi Anh Tuấn	Tóc Tiên
Episode 12 (Sunday, August 5)	2	Thu Phương	"Thanh âm" - Khả Linh (Note: Khả Linh attended and gave advice to Nguyễn Thị Thu Ngân during rehearsals.)	Nguyễn Thị Thu Ngân	126.56%	46.67% (14/21)	53.33% (16/21)	73.44%	Dư Khôi Nguyên	"Vẽ" - Phạm Toàn Thắng	Tóc Tiên
Episode 12 (Sunday, August 5)	2	Thu Phương	"Thanh âm" - Khả Linh	Nguyễn Thị Thu Ngân	126.56%	79.89%	20.11%	73.44%	Dư Khôi Nguyên	"Vẽ" - Phạm Toàn Thắng	Tóc Tiên
Episode 12 (Sunday, August 5)	3	Noo Phước Thịnh	"Bùa yêu" - Bích Phương	Đức Tâm & Hoàng Dương	137.16%	50% (15/21)	50% (15/21)	62.84%	An Nhiên & Kiều Trang	"Xe đạp" - Thùy Chi, M4U	Lam Trường
Episode 12 (Sunday, August 5)	3	Noo Phước Thịnh	"Bùa yêu" - Bích Phương	Đức Tâm & Hoàng Dương	137.16%	87.16%	12.84%	62.84%	An Nhiên & Kiều Trang	"Xe đạp" - Thùy Chi, M4U	Lam Trường
Episode 12 (Sunday, August 5)	4	Noo Phước Thịnh	"Cho nhau một nụ cười" - Mỹ Lệ (Note: Advisor Hồ Hoài Anh attended and gave advice to Nguyễn Kiều Oanh during rehearsals.)	Nguyễn Kiều Oanh	93.22%	43.75%% (14/21)	56.25% (18/21)	106.78%	Huỳnh Phương Duy	"Để em rời xa"- Nguyễn Hoàng Tôn (Note: Nguyễn Hoàng Tôn, who was the runner-up on the second season of The Voice of Vietnam, attended and gave advice to Huỳnh Phương Duy during rehearsals.)	Lam Trường
Episode 12 (Sunday, August 5)	4	Noo Phước Thịnh	"Cho nhau một nụ cười" - Mỹ Lệ	Nguyễn Kiều Oanh	93.22%	49.47%	50.53%	106.78%	Huỳnh Phương Duy	"Để em rời xa"- Nguyễn Hoàng Tôn	Lam Trường
Episode 12 (Sunday, August 5)	5	Thu Phương	"Ngẫu hứng lý qua cầu" - Quang Lê (Note: Trần Tiến (the author of the song) attended and gave advice to Đỗ Thành Nghiệp during rehearsals.)	Đỗ Thành Nghiệp	141.84%	55.88% (19/21)	44.12% (15/21)	58.16%	Avin Lu & Y Lux	"Đường cong" - Thu Minh (Note: Thu Minh attended and gave advice to Avin Lu & Y Lux during rehearsals.)	Tóc Tiên
Episode 12 (Sunday, August 5)	5	Thu Phương	"Ngẫu hứng lý qua cầu" - Quang Lê	Đỗ Thành Nghiệp	141.84%	85.96%	14.04%	58.16%	Avin Lu & Y Lux	"Đường cong" - Thu Minh	Tóc Tiên

== The Playoffs ==
Like the previous season, all the Playoffs round are pre-recorded except the Grand Finale. However, rather than cutting the same number of contestant on each team every week, this season the elimination result is determined solely by the public vote for each contestant and no longer involve coaches' decisions. Contestants who received the fewest public vote will be eliminated instantly regardless of which team they are from.

The "Wildcard" twist is also applied this season, which will advance an artist who has been eliminated prior to the Grand Finale but received the highest public vote on the website SaoStar.vn immediately to the Grand Finale for a second chance to compete for the title. The voting window for the Wildcard was closed on August 15, 2018 and the Wildcard was rewarded to Trần Ngọc Ánh (team Noo Phước Thịnh), who eventually emerged as the winner.

Color key:

Artist was saved by the Public's votes
Artist was saved by the Wildcard
Artist was eliminated

=== Week 1 (August 12) ===
The top 14 performed for the public's vote altogether. At the end of this round, four artists with the lowest vote were automatically eliminated.

Episode	Coach	Order	Artist	Song	Result
Episode 13 (August 12)	Noo Phước Thịnh	1	Đức Tâm & Hoàng Dương	"Em mới là người yêu anh" - Min	Eliminated
Episode 13 (August 12)	Lam Trường	2	Huỳnh Phương Duy	"Giữ lấy làm gì" - MONSTAR	Eliminated
Episode 13 (August 12)	Tóc Tiên	3	Lưu Hiền Trinh	"Mượn" - Uyên Linh	Public's vote
Episode 13 (August 12)	Thu Phương	4	Nguyễn Thị Thu Ngân	"Chợt như giấc mơ" - Võ Hạ Trâm	Public's vote
Episode 13 (August 12)	Thu Phương	5	Huỳnh Thanh Thảo	"Million Years Ago" - Adele	Public's vote
Episode 13 (August 12)	Lam Trường	6	Nguyễn Vũ Đoan Trang	"Come Back Home" - 2NE1	Eliminated
Episode 13 (August 12)	Noo Phước Thịnh	7	Nguyễn Minh Ngọc	"Về với đông" - Hồng Nhung	Public's vote
Episode 13 (August 12)	Thu Phương	8	Đặng Thị Mỹ Hằng	"Nhắm mắt thấy mùa hè" - Nguyên Hà	Eliminated
Episode 13 (August 12)	Tóc Tiên	9	Đặng Thị Thái Bình	"Cô gái ngày hôm qua" - Vũ Cát Tường	Public's vote
Episode 13 (August 12)	Lam Trường	10	Dương Quốc Anh	"Túy âm" - Xesi x Masew x Nhatnguyen	Public's vote
Episode 13 (August 12)	Noo Phước Thịnh	11	Trần Gia Nghi	"Cùng anh" - Ngọc Dolil	Public's vote
Episode 13 (August 12)	Thu Phương	12	Đỗ Thành Nghiệp	"Một thời để nhớ" - Ngọt x Đen	Public's vote
Episode 13 (August 12)	Tóc Tiên	13	Lê Chánh Tín	"Tháng tư là lời nói dối của em" - Hà Anh Tuấn	Public's vote
Episode 13 (August 12)	Noo Phước Thịnh	14	Trần Ngọc Ánh	"Nhân gian một cõi dại khờ" - Khánh Ly Sing My Song	Public's vote

=== Week 2: Quarterfinals (Top 10) (August 19) ===
The top 10 performed for the public's vote altogether. At the end of this round, three artists with the lowest vote were automatically eliminated.

Episode	Coach	Order	Artist	Song	Result
Episode 14 (August 19)	Tóc Tiên	1	Đặng Thị Thái Bình	"Tìm" - Min, Mr. A	Public's vote
Episode 14 (August 19)	Tóc Tiên	2	Lê Chánh Tín	"Sway" / "Quando quando quando" - Michael Bublé	Eliminated
Episode 14 (August 19)	Tóc Tiên	3	Lưu Hiền Trinh	"Son" - Đức Nghĩa	Public's vote
Episode 14 (August 19)	Thu Phương	4	Đỗ Thành Nghiệp	"Someone Like You" - Adele with Vietnamese lyrics	Eliminated
Episode 14 (August 19)	Thu Phương	5	Huỳnh Thanh Thảo	"Con cò" - Tùng Dương	Eliminated
Episode 14 (August 19)	Thu Phương	6	Nguyễn Thị Thu Ngân	"Gái Nghệ" - Tân Nhàn	Public's vote
Episode 14 (August 19)	Lam Trường	7	Dương Quốc Anh	"Người ta có thương mình đâu" - Trúc Nhân	Public's vote
Episode 14 (August 19)	Noo Phước Thịnh	8	Trần Ngọc Ánh	"Bồ công anh trong gió" - Ngọc My	Public's vote
Episode 14 (August 19)	Noo Phước Thịnh	9	Trần Gia Nghi	"Chiếc lá vô tình" - Hoàng Quyên	Public's vote
Episode 14 (August 19)	Noo Phước Thịnh	10	Nguyễn Minh Ngọc	"Cô ấy là ai" - Mỹ Tâm	Public's vote

=== Week 3: Semifinals (Top 7) (August 26) ===
The 7 semi-finalists performed for the public's vote altogether. At the end of this round, three artists with the lowest vote were automatically eliminated, leaving four artists advanced to next week's Grand Finale. With the elimination of Nguyễn Thị Thu Ngân, Thu Phương no longer had any artists remaining on her team. For the first time in the history of The Voice of Vietnam, a coach was not represented in the Grand Finale. Trần Ngọc Ánh from team Noo Phước Thịnh was originally eliminated at this round, but won the Wildcard and thus advanced to the finale. With her advancement to the finale, Noo Phước Thịnh also became the first coach in the show's history to have three artists in the final stage of the competition.

Episode	Coach	Order	Artist	Song	Result
Episode 15 (August 26)	Tóc Tiên	1	Lưu Hiền Trinh	"Bàn tay" - Lưu Thiên Hương	Eliminated
Episode 15 (August 26)	Noo Phước Thịnh	2	Trần Ngọc Ánh	"Cả một trời thương nhớ" - Hồ Ngọc Hà	Finals Wildcard
Episode 15 (August 26)	Thu Phương	3	Nguyễn Thị Thu Ngân	"Người kể chuyện giấc mơ" - Thịnh Nguyễn	Eliminated
Episode 15 (August 26)	Lam Trường	4	Dương Quốc Anh	"Em là bà nội của anh" - Trọng Hiếu	Public's vote
Episode 15 (August 26)	Tóc Tiên	5	Đặng Thị Thái Bình	"Xa anh" - Andiez Nam Trương	Public's vote
Episode 15 (August 26)	Noo Phước Thịnh	6	Nguyễn Minh Ngọc	"Bóng mây qua thềm" - Thu Minh	Public's vote
Episode 15 (August 26)	Noo Phước Thịnh	7	Trần Gia Nghi	"Thăng hoa" - Trần Thu Hà	Public's vote

== The Grand Finale ==
The Grand Finale was broadcast live, coincidentally on the Vietnamese National Day (September 2). This week, the final five performed a solo song and a duet with his/her coach. The voting window for the finale was opened a week prior to the finale day on the website SaoStar.vn. The artist achieved the highest accumulated vote from the website and SMS was crowned the winner.

Episode	Coach	Artist	Order	Solo Song	Order	Duet Song (with coach)	Result
Episode 16 (September 2)	Noo Phước Thịnh	Trần Ngọc Ánh	1	"Độc ẩm" - Nguyễn Kiều Anh / "Xinh" - Thu Minh	6	Boney M. medley: "You're My Heart, You're My Soul", "Sunny" & "Daddy Cool"	Winner (34.44%)
Episode 16 (September 2)	Lam Trường	Dương Quốc Anh	2	"Mẹ yêu" - Phương Uyên	8	"Mưa phi trường" - Lam Trường	Fifth place (8.25%)
Episode 16 (September 2)	Noo Phước Thịnh	Trần Gia Nghi	3	"Bên em là biển rộng" - Lệ Quyên	6	Boney M. medley: "You're My Heart, You're My Soul", "Sunny" & "Daddy Cool"	Third place (19.09%)
Episode 16 (September 2)	Noo Phước Thịnh	Nguyễn Minh Ngọc	4	"Cảm ơn đời" - Hồ Hoài Anh	6	Boney M. medley: "You're My Heart, You're My Soul", "Sunny" & "Daddy Cool"	Fourth place (18.18%)
Episode 16 (September 2)	Tóc Tiên	Đặng Thị Thái Bình	5	"Nàng Việt" - Lưu Thiên Hương	7	"Có ai thương em như anh" - Tóc Tiên	Runner-up (20.06%)

Non-competition performances
Order	Performer	Song
16.1	The Voice of Vietnam 5 coaches	Medley of: "Có phải em mùa thu Hà Nội" - Hồng Nhung/ "Sài Gòn đẹp lắm" - Y Vân/ "Niềm tin chiến thắng" - Mỹ Tâm
16.2	Ali Hoàng Dương ft. DJ K-ICM	"Chậm một phút"

== Elimination chart ==
=== Overall ===
Artist's info

- Artist from Team Thu Phương
- Artist from Team Lam Trường
- Artist from Team Tóc Tiên
- Artist from Team Noo Phước Thịnh

Result details

- Winner
- Runner-up
- Third place
- Fourth Place
- Fifth Place
- Saved by Wildcard
- Artist was saved by the public
- Artist was eliminated

Live show results per week
Artist	Week 1	Week 2	Semi-Finals	Finals
Trần Ngọc Ánh	Safe	Safe	Safe	Winner
Đặng Thị Thái Bình	Safe	Safe	Safe	Runner-up
Trần Gia Nghi	Safe	Safe	Safe	3rd Place
Nguyễn Minh Ngọc	Safe	Safe	Safe	4th Place
Dương Quốc Anh	Safe	Safe	Safe	5th Place
Lưu Hiền Trinh	Safe	Safe	Eliminated	Eliminated (Semi-Finals)
Nguyễn Thị Thu Ngân	Safe	Safe	Eliminated	Eliminated (Semi-Finals)
Lê Chánh Tín	Safe	Eliminated	Eliminated (Week 2)	
Huỳnh Thanh Thảo	Safe	Eliminated	Eliminated (Week 2)	
Đỗ Thành Nghiệp	Safe	Eliminated	Eliminated (Week 2)	
Đặng Thị Mỹ Hằng	Eliminated	Eliminated (Week 1)		
Đức Tâm & Hoàng Dương	Eliminated	Eliminated (Week 1)		
Huỳnh Phương Duy	Eliminated	Eliminated (Week 1)		
Nguyễn Vũ Đoan Trang	Eliminated	Eliminated (Week 1)		

=== Teams ===
Artist's info

- Artist from Team Thu Phương
- Artist from Team Lam Trường
- Artist from Team Tóc Tiên
- Artist from Team Noo Phước Thịnh

Result details

- Winner
- Runner-up
- Third place
- Fourth Place
- Fifth Place
- Saved by Wildcard
- Artist was eliminated

Live show results per week
Artist	Week 1	Week 2	Semi-Finals	Finals
Nguyễn Thị Thu Ngân	Advanced	Advanced	Eliminated	
Huỳnh Thanh Thảo	Advanced	Eliminated		
Đỗ Thành Nghiệp	Advanced	Eliminated		
Đặng Thị Mỹ Hằng	Eliminated			
Dương Quốc Anh	Advanced	Advanced	Advanced	5th Place
Huỳnh Phương Duy	Eliminated			
Nguyễn Vũ Đoan Trang	Eliminated			
Đặng Thị Thái Bình	Advanced	Advanced	Advanced	Runner-up
Lưu Hiền Trinh	Advanced	Advanced	Eliminated	
Lê Chánh Tín	Advanced	Eliminated		
Trần Ngọc Ánh	Advanced	Advanced	Wildcard	Winner
Trần Gia Nghi	Advanced	Advanced	Advanced	3rd Place
Nguyễn Minh Ngọc	Advanced	Advanced	Advanced	4th Place
Đức Tâm & Hoàng Dương	Eliminated			

== Contestants who appeared on previous shows or seasons ==
- Trần Duy Khang competed on the second season of The X Factor Vietnam and was eliminated at the Four-chair Challenge stage.
- An Nhiên competed on the sixth season of Vietnam Idol and reached top 20.
- Đỗ Hoàng Dương competed on the first season of The Voice Kids and joined team Giang Hồ where he was eliminated in the Battle round.
- Lưu Hiền Trinh was on the second season of The X Factor, as a member of the group S-Girl, where they came fourth.
- Dương Quốc Anh was on the second season of The X Factor but did not make it past the Judges' Auditions.
- Y Lux competed on the seventh season of Vietnam Idol and finished in the top 10.
- Nguyễn Hương Giang competed on season 1 of The Voice of Vietnam and joined team Hồ Ngọc Hà but was eliminated at the first live round.
- Huỳnh Thanh Thảo was on the second season of The X Factor, as a member of the group Dolphins, where they came seventh.
- Hoàng Mạnh competed on season 1 of The Voice of Vietnam but was eliminated in the Battle round.
- Nguyễn Minh Ngọc competed on the first season of The X Factor Vietnam and reached the top 16, but was eliminated at the first liveshow.
