= The Voice of Vietnam season 4 =

The Voice of Vietnam
- Season 4
- Hosted by: Nguyên Khang; Tim (media backstage correspondent); Quỳnh Chi (backstage, liveshows)
- Judges: Tóc Tiên; Thu Minh; Noo Phước Thịnh; Đông Nhi
- Winner: Ali Hoàng Dương
- Winning coach: Thu Minh
- Runner-up: Nguyễn Anh Tú

Release
- Original network: VTV3
- Original release: February 12 – June 4, 2017

Season chronology
- ← Previous; Season 3 Next → Season 5

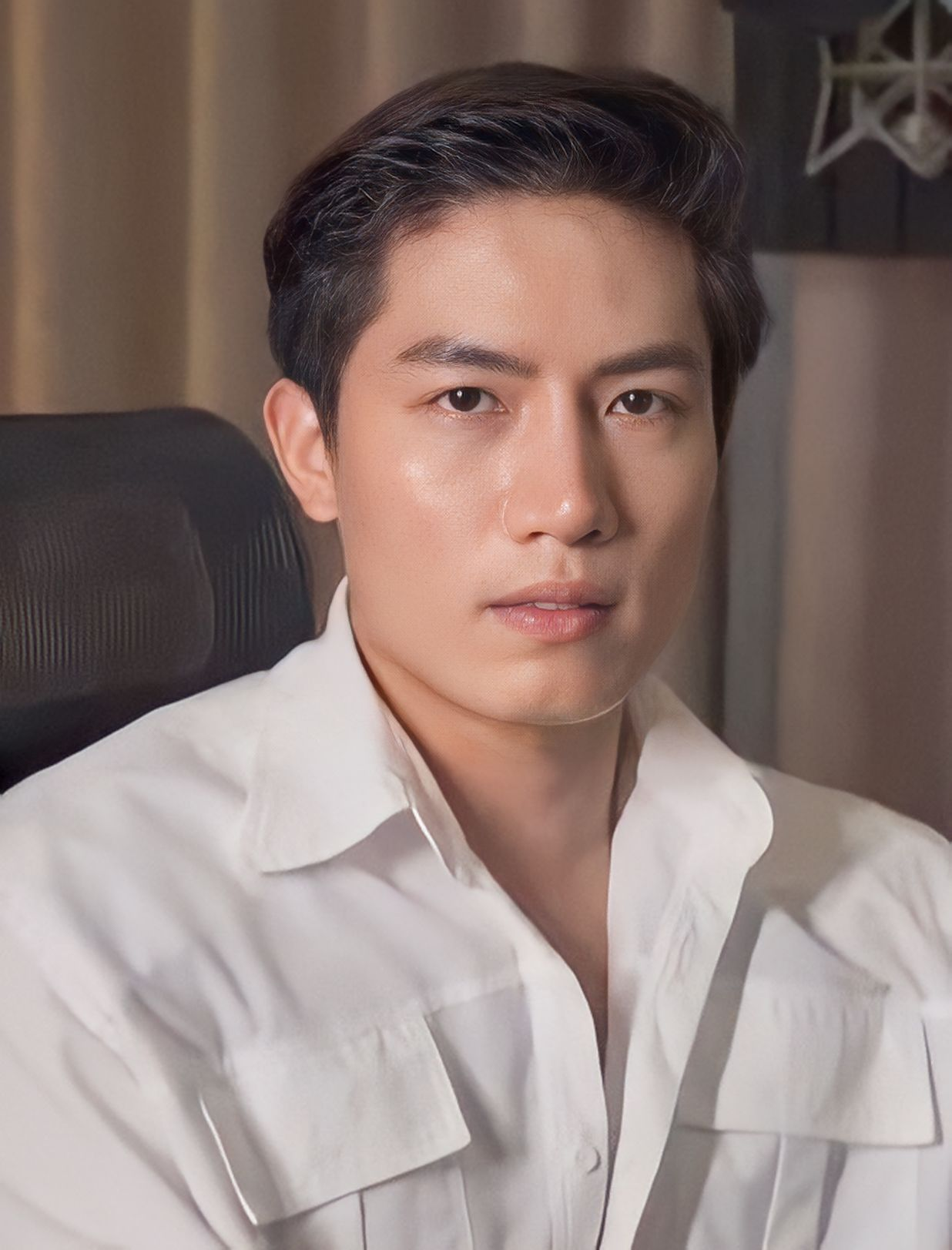
Anh Tú, season four runner-up

The fourth season of The Voice of Vietnam began on 12 February 2017. Thu Minh returned for her second season as a coach, while former Vietnam Idol Kids judge Tóc Tiên, The Voice Kids judges Noo Phước Thịnh and Đông Nhi joined the show, replacing Đàm Vĩnh Hưng, Thu Phương, Mỹ Tâm and Tuấn Hưng. This season marks the first time in any franchise of The Voice worldwide to have 3 female coaches and only one male coach.

This season is hosted by Nguyên Khang, former host of The X Factor Vietnam.

Ali Hoàng Dương won the competition on June 4, 2017, and Thu Minh became the winning coach for the second time.

== Coaches and hosts ==
The Voice of Vietnam season 4 coaches

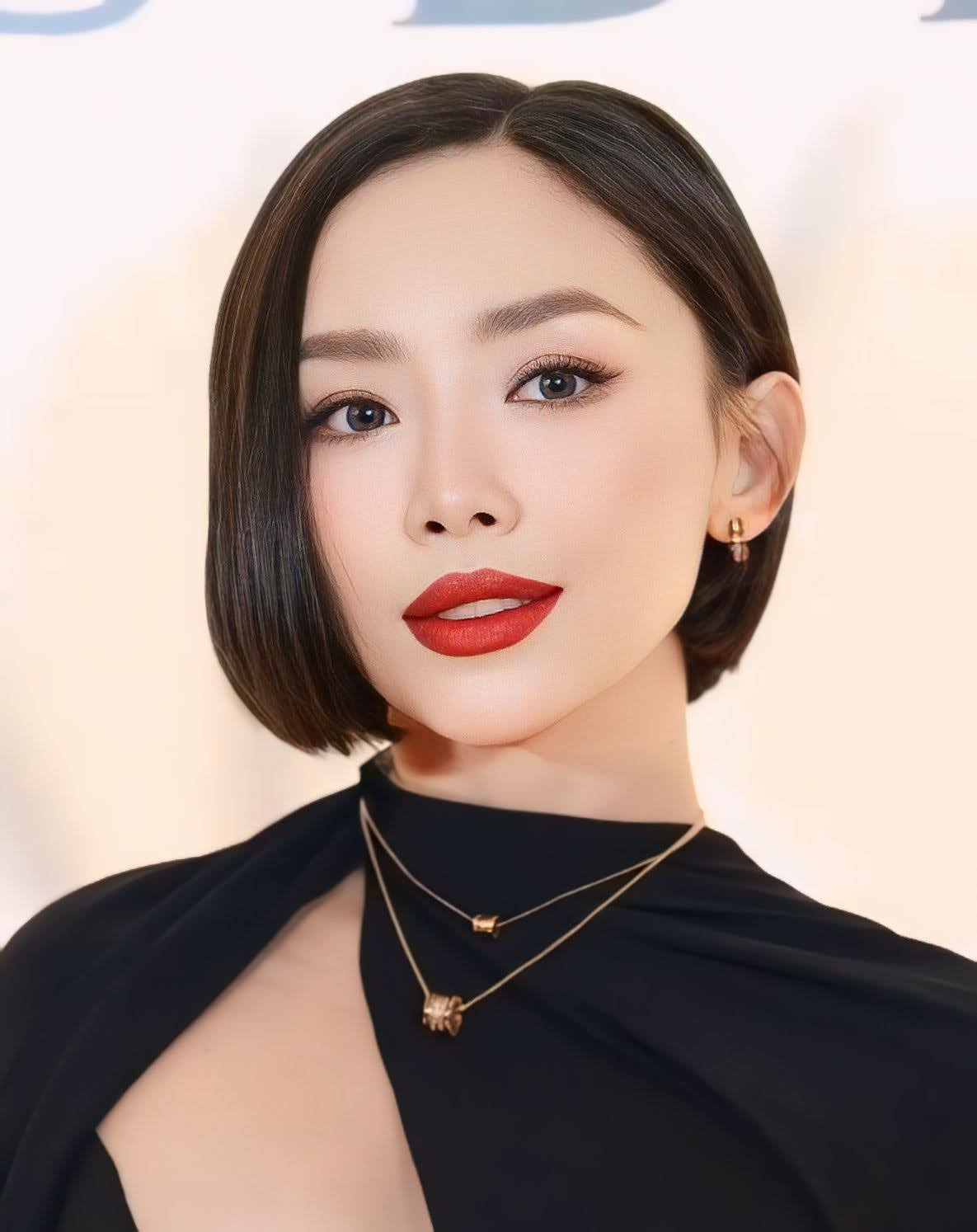
Tóc Tiên

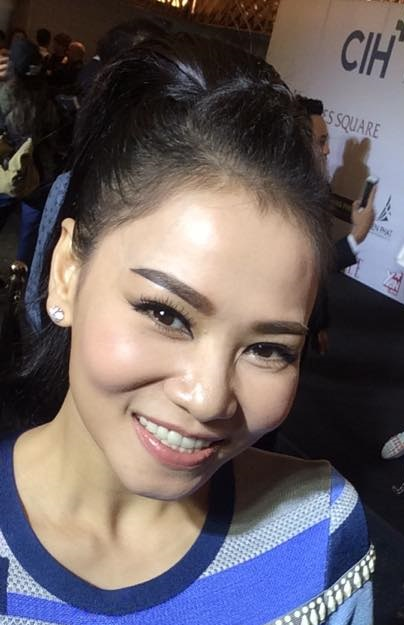
Thu Minh

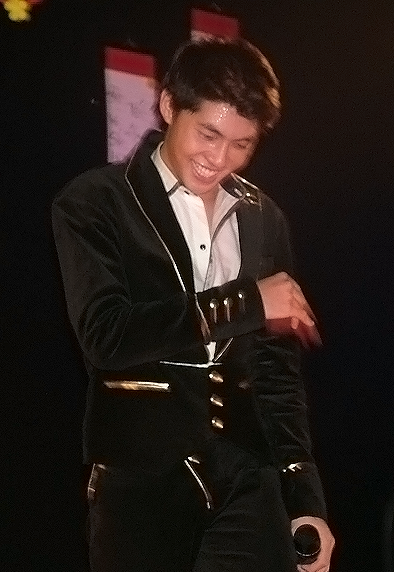
Noo Phước Thịnh

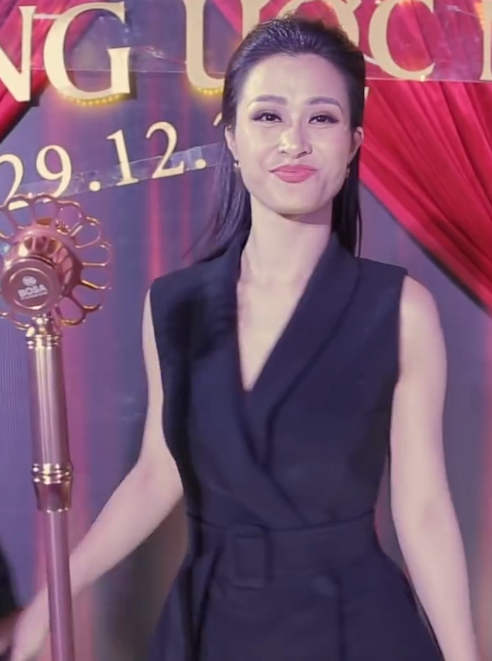
Đông Nhi

After the finals of The Voice of Vietnam season 3, Tuấn Hưng announced that he would not be returning for season 4 . In 2016, the show was not renewed for season 4 to make room for season 2 of The X Factor Vietnam. Coach Đàm Vĩnh Hưng announced in 2016 that he would not return to judge any talent show for a period of time, thus ruled himself out of the show. By the end of 2016 rumors stated that Đông Nhi would become a coach for the show's fourth season, after winning the Best Asian Artist Award of MTV EMA 2016 as well as season 4 of The Voice Kids. In December 2016, Noo Phước Thịnh's manager stated that he had just signed a new contract to judge a new "big" show, which stoked rumors that he would join The Voice as a coach, after judging The Voice Kids. Hồ Ngọc Hà, an original coach, was also rumored to be returning to the show. Ending all rumors, on 4 January 2017 it was confirmed that the coaches for season 4 would be Tóc Tiên, Noo Phước Thịnh, Đông Nhi and season 1 winning coach, Thu Minh. Former host of The X Factor Vietnam, Nguyên Khang became the show's new host, replacing Phan Anh, while singer Tim served as the media backstage correspondent throughout the season.

The advisors for each team at the battles are: Mỹ Linh (season 2 coach) for team Tóc Tiên, music producer Khắc Hưng and singer Trung Quân for team Thu Minh, Phương Thanh for team Noo and Thanh Hà for team Đông Nhi. Thanh Hà continued working with team Đông Nhi for the Knockouts, while Siu Black (former Vietnam Idol judge), Hoài Sa (season 3 advisor) and Hồ Ngọc Hà served as advisors for team Tóc Tiên, Thu Minh and Noo for the Knockouts, respectively.

== Teams ==
Color key

- Winner
- Runner-up
- Third place
- Fourth place
- Fifth place
- Eliminated in the Live shows
- Stolen in the Knockout rounds
- Eliminated in the Knockout rounds
- Eliminated in the Battle rounds

Coach	Top 44 Artists			
Tóc Tiên				
Tóc Tiên	Hiền Hồ	Huỳnh Phương Mai	Nguyễn Dương Thuận	Đào Trọng Tín
Tóc Tiên	Hoàng Mỹ Linh	Đặng Tuấn Phong	~~Phạm Hải Anh~~	Lê Quốc Đạt
Tóc Tiên	Trần Hải Linh	Nguyễn Đức Huy Hoàng	Ngô Lan Hương	Hoàng Yến
Thu Minh				
Thu Minh	Ali Hoàng Dương	Trần Anh Đức	Trần Tùng Anh	Phạm Hải Anh
Thu Minh	Phạm Thị Mỹ Linh	Phạm Văn Minh	~~Đào Trọng Tín~~	Đào Tâm Phương
Thu Minh	Nguyễn Hồng Ngọc	Song Hào & Ngọc Hiệp	Nguyễn Ngọc Duy	Niê Y Hon & Kpă H'Quyên
Noo Phước Thịnh				
Noo Phước Thịnh	Nguyễn Hiền Mai	Ngô Anh Đạt	Phan Thị Thanh Nga	Đặng Thị Thu Hà
Noo Phước Thịnh	Lương Minh Trí	Nguyễn Anh Phong	~~Han Sara~~	Lê Hồng Phi
Noo Phước Thịnh	Huỳnh Thị Ngọc Ny	Phạm Huy	Nguyễn Ngọc Phát	Phan Tuấn Anh
Đông Nhi				
Đông Nhi	Nguyễn Anh Tú	Han Sara	Trần Thị Huyền Dung	Nguyễn Thạc Giáng My
Đông Nhi	Ngọc Kayla	Thái Bảo Trâm	~~Đặng Thị Thu Hà~~	Phan Duy Anh
Đông Nhi	Nguyễn Thảo Phương	Nguyễn Đoàn Thanh	Nguyễn Đức Tài	Đỗ Công Linh
Note: Italicized names are stolen contestants (names struck through within former teams).

== Blind auditions ==
Key	Coach hit his or her "TÔI CHỌN BẠN" (I WANT YOU) button	Contestant eliminated with no coach pressing his or her "TÔI CHỌN BẠN" (I WANT YOU) button	Contestant defaulted to this coach's team	Contestant elected to join this coach's team	Contestant received an "All Turn"

=== Episode 1 (12 February) ===
Order	Artist	Age	Hometown	Song	Coaches and artists choices			
Order	Artist	Age	Hometown	Song	Tóc Tiên	Thu Minh	Noo	Đông Nhi
1	Đặng Tuấn Phong	24	Hanoi	"Và Thế Là Hết"- Soobin Hoàng Sơn		—		
2	Nguyễn Thạc Giáng My	20	Hanoi	"Tìm Một Người Như Thế"- Nguyễn Ngọc Anh		—		
3	Đặng Thị Thu Hà	25	Nam Định	"Vì Ai Vì Anh"- Đông Nhi	—	—	—	
4	Nguyễn Ngọc Duy	24	—N/a	"I Know"- Hakoota Dũng Hà	—		—	—
5	Nguyễn Anh Phong	27	Hưng Yên, Vĩnh Phúc	"Không Còn Em Nữa" (Are You Crazy)- Vibe	—			—
6	Han Sara	16	Hanoi/ Korea	"Haru Haru"- Big Bang				
7	Ngọc Tân & Thùy Trang	42/ 23	Thanh Hóa	"Don't You Go" - Vũ Cát Tường	—	—	—	—
8	Phạm Hải Anh	20	Ninh Bình	"Rise Up"- Andra Day		—		—
9	Phan Tuấn Anh	24	Phú Thọ	"Mơ"- Vũ Cát Tường		—		
10	Niê Y Hon & Kpă H'Quyên	48/ 27	Đắk Lắk	"Con Trâu"- Traditional	—		—	—
11	Nguyễn Anh Tú	25	Thái Bình	"Ngày Mai Chuyện Đã Khác"- Hakoota Dũng Hà				
12	Ali Hoàng Dương	20	Bình Thuận	"Gương Thần"- Thanh Bùi				

=== Episode 2 (19 February) ===
Order	Artist	Age	Hometown	Song	Coaches and artists choices			
Order	Artist	Age	Hometown	Song	Tóc Tiên	Thu Minh	Noo	Đông Nhi
1	Thái Bảo Trâm	22	Ho Chi Minh City	"Đã hơn một lần"- Nguyễn Hải Yến		—		
2	Đào Trọng Tín	22	—N/a	"Tự vấn"- Châu Đăng Khoa	—			
3	Lê Quốc Đạt	19	Ho Chi Minh City	"Em không quay về"- Hoàng Tôn		—	—	
4	Nguyễn Hồng Ngọc	23	Hanoi	"Dream"- Lời Việt: Chử Phương Nam			—	
5	Hiền Hồ (Hồ Thị Hiền)	19	Buôn Mê Thuột	"Lặng thầm một tình yêu"- Thanh Bùi/ "Wrecking Ball"- Miley Cyrus				
6	Đỗ Văn Huy	17	Buôn Mê Thuột	"Chưa bao giờ" - Trung Quân	—	—	—	—
7	Phan Thị Thanh Nga	23	Bình Định	"I Have Nothing"- Whitney Houston				
8	Ngọc Kayla	25	Đà Nẵng	"Keep me in love"- Hồ Ngọc Hà				
9	Song Hào & Ngọc Hiệp	—N/a	Hải Phòng	"Mẹ"- Phú Quang	—		—	—
10	Nguyễn Đức Huy Hoàng	21	—N/a	"Đừng lừa dối"- Lam Trường		—	—	—
11	Lê Hồng Phi	—N/a	Hanoi	"24K Magic"- Bruno Mars/ "Bước đến bên anh"- Trọng Hiếu		—		—
12	Trần Anh Đức	18	Hanoi	"Thành phố buồn"- Chế Linh				

=== Episode 3 (26 February) ===
Order	Artist	Age	Hometown	Song	Coaches and artists choices			
Order	Artist	Age	Hometown	Song	Tóc Tiên	Thu Minh	Noo	Đông Nhi
1	Phạm Văn Minh	24	Quảng Ngãi	"S'il suffisait d'aimer"- Celine Dion	—		—	
2	Trần Thị Huyền Dung	23	Huế	"Gửi người yêu cũ"- Hồ Ngọc Hà				
3	Ngô Lan Hương	18	Thanh Hóa	"Biệt ly"- Dzoãn Mẫn		—	—	
4	Hoàng Mỹ Linh	20	Thái Bình	"Love On Top"- Beyoncé		—	—	
5	Lương Minh Trí	26	—N/a	"When We Were Young"- Adele		—		—
6	Dương Mạc Yến My	23	Hanoi	"Tội lỗi" - Hồ Ngọc Hà	—	—	—	—
7	Nguyễn Thảo Phương	22	Tuyên Quang	"Something's Got a Hold on Me"- Etta James	—	—	—	
8	Nguyễn Đức Tài	—N/a	Bình Định	"Nấc Thang Lên Thiên Đường"- Bằng Kiều	—	—	—	
9	Ngô Anh Đạt	16	—N/a	"Halo"- Beyoncé		—		
10	Phan Duy Anh	25	Hanoi	"Phía sau một cô gái"- Soobin Hoàng Sơn		—		
11	Trần Hải Linh	19	Thái Bình	"Quay lưng"- Yến Lê			—	—
12	Trần Tùng Anh	21	Bắc Giang	"Mong anh về"- Thu Minh				

=== Episode 4 (5 March) ===
Order	Artist	Age	Hometown	Song	Coaches and artists choices			
Order	Artist	Age	Hometown	Song	Tóc Tiên	Thu Minh	Noo	Đông Nhi
1	Phạm Huy (Phạm Chí Huy)	26	Ho Chi Minh City	"Mưa phi trường"- Lam Trường		—		—
2	Nguyễn Ngọc Phát	23	Ho Chi Minh City	"Cảm giác" (Original song)				
3	Phạm Thị Mỹ Linh	22	Buôn Mê Thuột	"No"- Meghan Trainor	—			
4	Đỗ Công Linh	—N/a	—N/a	"She's Gone"- Bob Marley	—	—	—	
5	Nguyễn Dương Thuận	23	Thanh Hóa	"Tan"- Tuấn Hưng				
6	Huỳnh Phương Mai	19	Hanoi	"Mamma Knows Best"- Jessie J		—		
7	Huỳnh Thị Ngọc Ny	—N/a	Đà Nẵng	"Mẹ tôi"- Trần Tiến	—	—		—
8	Nguễn Hiền Mai	19	Hanoi	"House of the Rising Sun"- American Traditional				
9	Nguyễn Hoàng Thanh	23	Ho Chi Minh City	"Duyên"- Tạ Quang Thắng	—	—	Team full	
10	Đào Tâm Phương	19	Hanoi	"Hello"- Adele	—		Team full	Team full
11	Nguyễn Trọng Tín	23	Đồng Nai	"Million Reasons" - Lady Gaga	—	Team full	Team full	Team full
12	Hoàng Yến	26	—N/a	"Anh cứ đi đi"- Hari Won		Team full	Team full	Team full

== The Battles ==
The battle rounds determine which contestant from each team is qualified for the Knockouts. Two (or three) contestants within a team are paired together to sing one song, but only one contestant is chosen for the live shows. There are no "steal" this season, but after the Battles are concluded, each coach can bring back an eliminated contestant from their own team as a coach-comeback artist and compete in the Knockouts. After the Battles, each team will have 6 artists.

Color key:

Artist won the Battle and advanced to the Knockouts
Artist lost the Battle but was received the "coach-comeback" and advanced to the Knockouts
Artist lost the Battle and was eliminated

Episode	Coach	Order	Winner	Song	Loser
Episode 5 (March 12, 2017)	Tóc Tiên	1	Đặng Tuấn Phong	"Ngày hôm qua"- Vũ Cát Tường	Nguyễn Đức Huy Hoàng
Episode 5 (March 12, 2017)	Đông Nhi	2	Trần Thị Huyền Dung	"Cho em một ngày"- Hồng Nhung	Nguyễn Đức Tài
Episode 5 (March 12, 2017)	Thu Minh	3	Trần Anh Đức	"Nắm lấy tay anh"- Tuấn Hưng	Nguyễn Ngọc Duy
Episode 5 (March 12, 2017)	Tóc Tiên	4	Hiền Hồ	"Lady Marmalade"- Christina Aguilera, Mýa, P!nk, Lil' Kim	Ngô Lan Hương
Episode 5 (March 12, 2017)	Tóc Tiên	4	Hiền Hồ	"Lady Marmalade"- Christina Aguilera, Mýa, P!nk, Lil' Kim	Hoàng Yến
Episode 5 (March 12, 2017)	Noo Phước Thịnh	5	Ngô Anh Đạt	"Perfect Illusion"- Lady Gaga	Nguyễn Ngọc Phát
Episode 6 (March 19, 2017)	Thu Minh	1	Đào Trọng Tín	"Treasure"- Bruno Mars	Phạm Thị Mỹ Linh
Episode 6 (March 19, 2017)	Noo Phước Thịnh	2	Nguyễn Anh Phong	"Xinh"- Thu Minh/ "What is love?"- Hồ Ngọc Hà/ "Em không cần anh"- Hồ Ngọc Hà/ "Không"- Elvis Phương	Phạm Huy
Episode 6 (March 19, 2017)	Noo Phước Thịnh	2	Nguyễn Anh Phong	"Xinh"- Thu Minh/ "What is love?"- Hồ Ngọc Hà/ "Em không cần anh"- Hồ Ngọc Hà/ "Không"- Elvis Phương	Huỳnh Thị Ngọc Ny
Episode 6 (March 19, 2017)	Tóc Tiên	3	Hoàng Mỹ Linh	"You and I"- Lady Gaga	Phạm Hải Anh
Episode 6 (March 19, 2017)	Đông Nhi	4	Nguyễn Thạc Giáng My	"Xin anh đừng"- Đông Nhi	Đặng Thị Thu Hà
Episode 6 (March 19, 2017)	Thu Minh	5	Ali Hoàng Dương	"Khi người mình yêu khóc"- Phan Mạnh Quỳnh	Song Hào & Ngọc Hiệp
Episode 7 (March 26, 2017)	Đông Nhi	1	Nguyễn Anh Tú	"Đi về đâu" - Tiên Tiên	Nguyễn Thảo Phương
Episode 7 (March 26, 2017)	Noo Phước Thịnh	2	Han Sara	"Lặng thầm" - Noo Phước Thịnh	Phan Tuấn Anh
Episode 7 (March 26, 2017)	Thu Minh	3	Phạm Văn Minh	"Lạc" - Đông Nhi & Ông Cao Thắng	Niê Y Hon & Kpă H'Quyên
Episode 7 (March 26, 2017)	Thu Minh	3	Phạm Văn Minh	"Lạc" - Đông Nhi & Ông Cao Thắng	Đào Tâm Phương
Episode 7 (March 26, 2017)	Noo Phước Thịnh	4	Lương Minh Trí	"Thủy thần" - Bùi Hoàng Nam Đức Anh	Lê Hồng Phi
Episode 7 (March 26, 2017)	Tóc Tiên	5	Nguyễn Dương Thuận	"Tình lãng phí" - Hứa Kim Tuyền	Lê Quốc Đạt
Episode 8 (April 2, 2017)	Đông Nhi	1	Thái Bảo Trâm	"Dù tinh phôi pha" - Hồ Ngọc Hà & Hà Anh Tuấn	Phan Duy Anh
Episode 8 (April 2, 2017)	Đông Nhi	2	Ngọc Kayla	"Bài ca tuổi trẻ"/ "Price Tag"- Jessie J	Đỗ Công Linh
Episode 8 (April 2, 2017)	Đông Nhi	2	Ngọc Kayla	"Bài ca tuổi trẻ"/ "Price Tag"- Jessie J	Nguyễn Đoàn Thanh
Episode 8 (April 2, 2017)	Noo Phước Thịnh	3	Nguyễn Hiền Mai	"Ta chẳng còn ai" - Phương Thanh	Phan Thị Thanh Nga
Episode 8 (April 2, 2017)	Tóc Tiên	4	Huỳnh Phương Mai	"Buông"- Vũ Thảo My ft. Kimmese	Trần Hải Linh
Episode 8 (April 2, 2017)	Thu Minh	5	Trần Tùng Anh	"Queen of The Night" - Mozart	Nguyễn Hồng Ngọc

== The Knockouts ==
This season, the knockouts is brought back after being scrapped in season 3. After the Battle Round, each coach will have 6 contestants for the Knockouts and they will pair 2 artists for a "Knockouts". Each contestant will sing a song of their own choice, and their respective coach will decide the winner of that Knockouts. In addition, each coach is allowed to "steal" one losing contestant from another coach's team. Contestants who either won the Knockouts or being stolen by another coach are qualified for the Live Shows. After the Knockouts, each team will has 4 contestants.

Color key:

Artist won the Knockout and advanced to the Live Shows
Artist lost the Knockout but was stolen by another coach and advanced to the Live Shows
Artist lost the Knockout and was eliminated

Episode	Coach	Order	Song	Artists		Song	'Steal' result			
Episode	Coach	Order	Song	Winner	Loser	Song	Tóc Tiên	Thu Minh	Noo	Đông Nhi
Episode 9 (April 9)	Đông Nhi	1	"Người đàn bà hóa đá"- Bức Tường	Nguyễn Thạc Giáng My	Thái Bảo Trâm	"Note to God"- JoJo	—	—	—	—N/a
Episode 9 (April 9)	Tóc Tiên	2	"Vội vàng"- Tạ Quang Thắng	Nguyễn Dương Thuận	Đặng Tuấn Phong	"Vì mất đi ánh mặt trời" - Trung Quân Idol	—N/a	—	—	—
Episode 9 (April 9)	Noo Phước Thịnh	3	"Rơi" - Hoàng Thùy Linh	Nguyễn Hiền Mai	Nguyễn Anh Phong	"You Raise Me Up"- Secret Garden	—	—	—N/a	—
Episode 9 (April 9)	Thu Minh	4	"Lạc nhau có phải muôn đời" - Erik St.319	Ali Hoàng Dương	Đào Trọng Tín	"Anh đã quen với cô đơn" - Soobin Hoàng Sơn		—N/a	—	—
Episode 10 (April 16)	Noo Phước Thịnh	1	"Giọt nắng bên thềm" - Thanh Lam	Ngô Anh Đạt	Han Sara	"Thương ca Tiếng Việt" - Mỹ Tâm	Team full	—	—N/a	
Episode 10 (April 16)	Thu Minh	2	"City of Stars" - Ryan Gosling ft Emma Stone	Trần Anh Đức	Phạm Văn Minh	"Chuyện của mùa đông" - Hà Anh Tuấn	Team full	—N/a	—	Team full
Episode 10 (April 16)	Tóc Tiên	3	"Tell Me Why" - Tóc Tiên	Huỳnh Phương Mai	Hoàng Mỹ Linh	"Fade"- So Hyang	Team full	—	—	Team full
Episode 10 (April 16)	Đông Nhi	4	"Anh ghét làm bạn em" - Phan Mạnh Quỳnh	Nguyễn Anh Tú	Ngọc Kayla	"I will show you" - Ailee	Team full	—	—	Team full
Episode 11 (April 23)	Tóc Tiên	1	"Lang thang" - Phương Thanh	Hiền Hồ	Phạm Hải Anh	"Thăng hoa" - Trần Thu Hà	Team full		—	Team full
Episode 11 (April 23)	Noo Phước Thịnh	2	"Nỗi đau ngự trị" - Lệ Quyên	Phan Thị Thanh Nga	Lương Minh Trí	"Lá diêu bông" - Trần Tiến	Team full	Team full	—N/a	Team full
Episode 11 (April 23)	Đông Nhi	3	"Tiếng đêm" - Hoàng Thùy Linh	Trần Thị Huyền Dung	Đặng Thị Thu Hà	"Tôi là ai" - Đinh Hương	Team full	Team full		Team full
Episode 11 (April 23)	Thu Minh	4	"Gửi anh xa nhớ" - Bích Phương	Trần Tùng Anh	Phạm Thị Mỹ Linh	"Tâm sự với người lạ" - Tiên Cookie	Team full	Team full	Team full	Team full

== Playoffs ==
Different from the previous 3 seasons, in this season, only the finals show is recorded live, whereas all the playoffs round are pre-recorded. The result are voted on in real-time by audience attending the show in the stadium. The rules are still similar to the past 3 seasons, which one (or two) artists received the most public vote will automatically advance to the next round, the coaches then choose one artist from their team to move on to the next round and the other team member is sent home. In addition, the "Wildcard" twist, which appeared on many Vietnamese shows like The X Factor Vietnam, Sing My Song Vietnam, The Face Vietnam and The Voice Kids is brought in, where audience can vote for an artist who was previously eliminated before the final to come back and compete in the live finals on the website SaoStar.vn.

Color key:

Artist was saved by the Public's votes
Artist was saved by his/her coach
Artist was saved by the Wildcard
Artist was eliminated

=== Week 1 and 2 (April 30 & May 7, 2017) ===
Episode	Coach	Order	Artist	Song	Result
Episode 12 (Sunday, April 30)	Tóc Tiên	1	Nguyễn Dương Thuận	"Chí Phèo"- Bùi Công Nam	Public's vote
Episode 12 (Sunday, April 30)	Đông Nhi	2	Trần Thị Huyền Dung	"I Love You"- Bee.T	Public's vote
Episode 12 (Sunday, April 30)	Tóc Tiên	3	Huỳnh Phương Mai	"Ánh sáng đời tôi"- Thu Minh	Tóc Tiên's choice
Episode 12 (Sunday, April 30)	Đông Nhi	4	Nguyễn Anh Tú	"Ánh nắng của anh"- Đức Phúc	Public's vote
Episode 12 (Sunday, April 30)	Tóc Tiên	5	Đào Trọng Tín	"Quá khứ còn là gì"- Rocker Nguyễn	Eliminated
Episode 12 (Sunday, April 30)	Đông Nhi	6	Nguyễn Thạc Giáng My	"Chốn thiên đường"/ "Bài ca trên núi"- Trọng Tấn	Eliminated
Episode 12 (Sunday, April 30)	Đông Nhi	7	Han Sara	"Side to Side"- Ariana Grande ft. Nicki Minaj	Đông Nhi's choice
Episode 12 (Sunday, April 30)	Tóc Tiên	8	Hiền Hồ	"Mình yêu từ bao giờ"- Miu Lê	Public's vote
Episode 13 (Sunday, May 7)	Thu Minh	1	Phạm Hải Anh	"Tình 2000"- Mỹ Linh	Eliminated
Episode 13 (Sunday, May 7)	Noo Phước Thịnh	2	Nguyễn Hiền Mai	"I Don't Want to Miss a Thing"- Aerosmith	Public's vote
Episode 13 (Sunday, May 7)	Thu Minh	3	Trần Tùng Anh	"Dệt tầm gai"- Trần Thu Hà	Thu Minh's choice
Episode 13 (Sunday, May 7)	Noo Phước Thịnh	4	Đặng Thị Thu Hà	"Vì tôi còn sống"- Tiên Tiên	Eliminated
Episode 13 (Sunday, May 7)	Thu Minh	5	Trần Anh Đức	"Trái tim em cũng biết đau"- Bảo Anh	Public's vote
Episode 13 (Sunday, May 7)	Noo Phước Thịnh	6	Phan Thị Thanh Nga	"Love you in silence"- Janice Phương	Noo's choice
Episode 13 (Sunday, May 7)	Noo Phước Thịnh	7	Ngô Anh Đạt	"Não cá vàng"- Only C ft Lou Hoàng	Public's vote
Episode 13 (Sunday, May 7)	Thu Minh	8	Ali Hoàng Dương	"Tell Me Why"- Thu Minh	Public's vote

=== Week 3 (May 14, 2017) ===
Episode	Coach	Order	Artist	Song	Result
Episode 14 (Sunday, May 14)	Tóc Tiên	1	Huỳnh Phương Mai	"Giọt sương trên mí mắt" - Hồng Nhung	Tóc Tiên's choice
Episode 14 (Sunday, May 14)	Đông Nhi	2	Trần Thị Huyền Dung	"Trò đùa của tạo hóa" - Bùi Anh Tuấn	Eliminated
Episode 14 (Sunday, May 14)	Noo Phước Thịnh	3	Phan Thị Thanh Nga	"Con ma" - Nguyễn Hải Phong	Eliminated
Episode 14 (Sunday, May 14)	Đông Nhi	4	Nguyễn Anh Tú	"Ngày mai sẽ khác" - Lê Hiếu	Public's vote
Episode 14 (Sunday, May 14)	Tóc Tiên	5	Nguyễn Dương Thuận	"Linh hồn và thể xác - Nguyễn Hải Phong	Eliminated
Episode 14 (Sunday, May 14)	Đông Nhi	6	Han Sara	"Lạc trôi" - Sơn Tùng M-TP	Đông Nhi's choice
Episode 14 (Sunday, May 14)	Noo Phước Thịnh	7	Ngô Anh Đạt	"Nắng thủy tinh" - Khánh Ly	Noo's choice
Episode 14 (Sunday, May 14)	Thu Minh	8	Trần Tùng Anh	"Ngày mai" - Tóc Tiên	Eliminated
Episode 14 (Sunday, May 14)	Thu Minh	9	Ali Hoàng Dương	"Chuyện hôm qua đó" - Kiên Trần	Public's vote
Episode 14 (Sunday, May 14)	Noo Phước Thịnh	10	Nguyễn Hiền Mai	"Ngẫu hứng sông Hồng" - Hồng Nhung	Public's vote
Episode 14 (Sunday, May 14)	Tóc Tiên	11	Hiền Hồ	"Đánh thức" - Tinna Tình	Public's vote
Episode 14 (Sunday, May 14)	Thu Minh	12	Trần Anh Đức	"Moves Like Jagger" - Maroon 5 ft. Christina Aguilera	Thu Minh's choice

=== Week 4 (May 21, 2017): Semifinals ===
Just like the past 3 seasons, in this round, one artist in each team with the highest combined percentage from the public's vote and their coach's point is qualified for the final, while the other act is sent home but can be brought back via Wildcard.

Episode	Coach	Order	Song	Finalist		Coach/ Public vote %		Eliminated artist		Order	Song
Episode 15 (Sunday, May 21)	Tóc Tiên	5	"I'm in love"- Tóc Tiên	Hiền Hồ	106,58%	50%	50%	93,42%	Huỳnh Phương Mai	2	"Purple Rain"- Prince
Episode 15 (Sunday, May 21)	Tóc Tiên	5	"I'm in love"- Tóc Tiên	Hiền Hồ	106,58%	56,58%	43,42%	93,42%	Huỳnh Phương Mai	2	"Purple Rain"- Prince
Episode 15 (Sunday, May 21)	Thu Minh	4	"Let Me Love You"- DJ Snake ft. Justin Bieber	Ali Hoàng Dương	130,59%	55%	45%	69,41%	Trần Anh Đức	7	"Người ơi người ở đừng về"- Traditional
Episode 15 (Sunday, May 21)	Thu Minh	4	"Let Me Love You"- DJ Snake ft. Justin Bieber	Ali Hoàng Dương	130,59%	75,59%	24,41%	69,41%	Trần Anh Đức	7	"Người ơi người ở đừng về"- Traditional
Episode 15 (Sunday, May 21)	Noo Phước Thịnh	8	"Hold Me Tonight" - Noo Phước Thịnh/ "Hot" - Đông Nhi	Nguyễn Hiền Mai	117,19%	50%	50%	82,81%	Ngô Anh Đạt	3	"One Night Only"- Jennifer Hudson
Episode 15 (Sunday, May 21)	Noo Phước Thịnh	8	"Hold Me Tonight" - Noo Phước Thịnh/ "Hot" - Đông Nhi	Nguyễn Hiền Mai	117,19%	67,19%	32,81%	82,81%	Ngô Anh Đạt	3	"One Night Only"- Jennifer Hudson
Episode 15 (Sunday, May 21)	Đông Nhi	1	"Yêu 5" - Rhymastic	Nguyễn Anh Tú	110,19%	50%	50%	89,81%	Han Sara	6	"Tuổi đá buồn"- Khánh Ly
Episode 15 (Sunday, May 21)	Đông Nhi	1	"Yêu 5" - Rhymastic	Nguyễn Anh Tú	110,19%	60,19%	39,81%	89,81%	Han Sara	6	"Tuổi đá buồn"- Khánh Ly

On Thursday, May 25, 2017, Ngô Anh Đạt from team Noo Phước Thịnh was officially announced as the Wildcard act and would return for the Live Finals after receiving the most votes from the audience in the "Wildcard" twist. However, since the Live Finals was recorded before the announcement was made, Ngô Anh Đạt only performed his finalist's single as well as the duet with his coach, Noo Phước Thịnh in the Grand Finale.

=== Week 5 and 6 (May 28, 2017 & June 4, 2017): The Finals ===
Just like season 3, the finals is a two-night episode. Night 1 featured the top 4's solo performances as well as their duets with guest performers and was pre-recorded, while Night 2 (The Grand Finale) featured the finalist (including the Wildcard artist)'s final songs as well as duets with their coaches and was broadcast live. The voting windows were opened from the end of Night 1 to the end of the last competition performance of Night 2.

Coach	Artist	Episode 16- Live Top 4 Performances (April 28, 2017)				Episode 17- The Grand Finale (May 4, 2017)				Result
Coach	Artist	Order	Solo song	Order	Duet/ trio song (with Guest performers)	Order	Finalist's single	Order	Duet/ trio song (with Coach)	Result
Đông Nhi	Nguyễn Anh Tú	1	"Cứ đi" (Original song)	8	"Cát bụi"- Trịnh Công Sơn (with Cẩm Vân & Trịnh Nhật Minh)	4	"Tình nhân hay người dưng"- Đỗ Hiếu	6	"Sẽ không quay về"- Đỗ Hiếu	Runner-up (23,18%)
Noo Phước Thịnh	Nguyễn Hiền Mai	2	"Who's Lovin' You"- The Jackson 5/ "Feeling Good"- Michael Bublé	5	"Về đi em"- Trần Tiến (with Hoài Lâm)	3	"Never Give Up" (Original song)	9	"Một mình"- Thanh Tùng	Third place (20,69%)
Tóc Tiên	Hiền Hồ	3	"Chạy đi thôi"- Lưu Thiên Hương	6	"Mùa yêu đầu"- Đinh Mạnh Ninh (with Soobin Hoàng Sơn)	2	"Đời"- Lưu Thiên Hương	7	"Hôn"- Tóc Tiên	Fourth place (13,72%)
Thu Minh	Ali Hoàng Dương	4	"Let Her Go"- Lưu Thiên Hương	7	"Đừng để con một mình"- Trang Pháp (with Trang Pháp)	5	"Trắng đen"- Hồ Hoài Anh	8	"Yêu mình anh"/ "Đừng yêu"- Thu Minh	Winner (33,91%)
Noo Phước Thịnh	Ngô Anh Đạt	—N/a				1	"Hương ngọc lan"- Mỹ Linh	9	"Một mình"- Thanh Tùng	Fifth place (8,5%)

Non-competition performances
Order	Performer	Song
16.1	The Voice Top 4	"We are The Voice"- Hồ Hoài Anh
17.1	The Voice of Vietnam 4 coaches	"Ngôi sao cô đơn"- Thanh Tùng
17.2	Thu Minh	"I Don't Believe"

== Elimination chart ==
=== Overall ===
Artist's info

- Artist from Team Tóc Tiên
- Artist from Team Thu Minh
- Artist from Team Noo Phước Thịnh
- Artist from Team Đông Nhi

Result details

- Winner
- Runner-up
- Third place
- Fourth Place
- Fifth Place
- Saved by Wildcard
- Artist was saved by the public
- Artist was saved by his/her coach
- Artist was eliminated

Live show results per week
Artist	Week 1	Week 2	Week 3	Semi-Finals	Finals
Ali Hoàng Dương	—N/a	Safe	Safe	Safe	Winner
Nguyễn Anh Tú	Safe	—N/a	Safe	Safe	Runner-up
Nguyễn Hiền Mai	—N/a	Safe	Safe	Safe	3rd Place
Hiền Hồ	Safe	—N/a	Safe	Safe	4th Place
Ngô Anh Đạt	—N/a	Safe	Safe	Safe	5th Place
Han Sara	Safe	—N/a	Safe	Eliminated	Eliminated (Semi-Finals)
Trần Anh Đức	—N/a	Safe	Safe	Eliminated	Eliminated (Semi-Finals)
Huỳnh Phương Mai	Safe	—N/a	Safe	Eliminated	Eliminated (Semi-Finals)
Nguyễn Dương Thuận	Safe	—N/a	Eliminated	Eliminated (Week 3)	
Trần Tùng Anh	—N/a	Safe	Eliminated	Eliminated (Week 3)	
Phan Thị Thanh Nga	—N/a	Safe	Eliminated	Eliminated (Week 3)	
Trần Thị Huyền Dung	Safe	—N/a	Eliminated	Eliminated (Week 3)	
Phạm Hải Anh	—N/a	Eliminated	Eliminated (Week 2)		
Đặng Thị Thu Hà	—N/a	Eliminated	Eliminated (Week 2)		
Đào Trọng Tín	Eliminated	Eliminated (Week 1)			
Nguyễn Thạc Giáng My	Eliminated	Eliminated (Week 1)			

=== Team ===
Color key
Artist's info

- Artist from Team Tóc Tiên
- Artist from Team Thu Minh
- Artist from Team Noo Phước Thịnh
- Artist from Team Đông Nhi

Result details

- Winner
- Runner-up
- Third place
- Fourth Place
- Fifth place
- Eliminated
- Artist Saved by Wildcard

Artist	Week 1	Week 2	Week 3	Week 4	Finals
Hiền Hồ	Public's vote	—N/a	Public's vote	Advanced	4th Place
Huỳnh Phương Mai	Coach's choice	—N/a	Coach's choice	Eliminated	
Nguyễn Dương Thuận	Public's vote	—N/a	Eliminated		
Đào Trọng Tín	Eliminated				
Ali Hoàng Dương	—N/a	Public's vote	Public's vote	Advanced	Winner
Trần Anh Đức	—N/a	Public's vote	Coach's choice	Eliminated	
Trần Tùng Anh	—N/a	Coach's choice	Eliminated		
Phạm Hải Anh	—N/a	Eliminated			
Nguyễn Hiền Mai	—N/a	Public's vote	Public's vote	Advanced	3rd Place
Ngô Anh Đạt	—N/a	Public's vote	Coach's choice	Wildcard	5th Place
Phan Thị Thanh Nga	—N/a	Coach's choice	Eliminated		
Đặng Thị Thu Hà	—N/a	Eliminated			
Nguyễn Anh Tú	Public's vote	—N/a	Public's vote	Advanced	Runner-up
Han Sara	Coach's choice	—N/a	Coach's choice	Eliminated	
Trần Thị Huyền Dung	Public's vote	—N/a	Eliminated		
Nguyễn Thạc Giáng My	Eliminated				

== Contestants who appeared on previous shows or seasons ==
- Đặng Tuấn Phong, Nguyễn Ngọc Duy and Phan Tuấn Anh competed on season 7 of Vietnam Idol and finished in top 12, top 16 and top 33, respectively.
- Thái Bảo Trâm competed on season 3 of The Voice of Vietnam and reached the quarterfinals (Top 12).
- Phan Thị Thanh Nga was on The Winner Is... but was eliminated at the battles. She was also placed second on Tiếng ca học đường 2011.
- Hiền Hồ competed on season 2 of The X Factor Vietnam and was eliminated at the Four-chair Challenge stage.
- Lương Minh Trí competed on season 1 of The Voice of Vietnam and joined team Trần Lập, but was defeated in the battle by Nguyễn Kiên Giang, a finalist of that season.
- Phạm Chí Huy placed 12th on season 2 of The X Factor Vietnam.
- Nguyễn Ngọc Phát competed on season 2 of The X Factor Vietnam as part of the band Fire. The group was eliminated at the Judge's House round.
