= Sing My Song Vietnam =

- Also known as: Sing My Song
- Bài hát hay nhất
- Genre: Reality television
- Created by: Jin Lei
- Judges: Đức Trí (seasons 1–2); Lê Minh Sơn (seasons 1–2); Giáng Son (seasons 1–2); Hồ Hoài Anh (season 2); Nguyễn Hải Phong (season 1)
- Country of origin: Vietnam
- No. of seasons: 3

Production
- Production company: Cát Tiên Sa

Original release
- Network: VTV3 – Vietnam Television
- Release: November 20, 2016 – March 31, 2023

Related
- Sing My Song

Sing My Song Vietnam (Vietnamese: "Bài hát hay nhất") is a reality television show aimed at finding versatile artists who can compose and sing well. The program is organized to seek, foster and develop generations of talented musicians and artists. The organizing committee will support candidates selected for the recording round for capacity building, product distribution, image building and media sponsorship. The program has been distributed in more than 30 countries around the world and in Asia, was the first broadcast in China with high ratings.

In 2016, the program was bought by Cat Tien Sa Company with the Vietnamese name "Bài hát hay nhất" and broadcast on VTV3 - Vietnam Television. The show is produced based on the original Chinese show, Sing My Song. It was the third international adaptation of the programme, and the first adaption in Asia. The judging panel is composed of four famous and reputable musicians/ producers in Vietnam. The first winner is Cao Bá Hưng.

== Format ==
The series consists of four phases: the preliminary, the audition called "the recordings", the battles called "the compositions", and one final live show to determine the winner of the series.

=== The Preliminary ===
Candidates will submit their profiles and songs to the contest online, and the producers will select the best songs for the recordings round.

=== The Recording ===
In this round, the contestants will perform the song they composed, and the coaches will not be able to see the contestant's performance directly, which is blocked by a large screen running the lyrics. If the manager feels satisfied with the melody and the content of the song, they will push the red button in front of the receiver to choose the artist for their teams, and immediately the screen in front of that coach will lower.

When the performance is over, all screens are lowered for the judges to interact with the contestant. In cases where two or more judges select the contestant, the singer-songwriter has the final choice of coach. This format is similar to the Blind auditions of The Voice of Vietnam. At the end of this round, 32 performances will be chosen by four teams of four coaches, each with 8 contestants.

=== The Composition and Battle Round ===
Each coach will give a theme to their album. The eight contestants of each team were divided into four pairs, each pair of two contestants composing the same theme of the album and sharing a separate room within 24 hours (including lunch and dinner). At the end of 24 hours, all 8 contestants will be performing a demo for the coach and advisor respectively. Each team will have an advisor, who will accompany the coach to help them complete their track. The coach will choose one artist in each pair to go on to the next round, where they will perform the song that was composed in front of the other coaches and professional teams. The advisor then will select one more contestant in the remaining four to move on to the Fighting Round. At the end of the Compositions round, each team has five contestants left and three contestants eliminated.

In the Fighting Round, the five contestants of each team will perform in front of the coaches and professional councils. The Professional Council, composed of 31 musicians/ producers, will mark the score directly after each contestant's performance. Ending all five performances of a team, the other three coaches will decide to give each of the 3 points for each artist that they like. Candidates receiving the highest score will automatically move on to the Live Finals. The coach will choose one of the four remaining contestants for the Live Finals. At the end of the round, each team has two contestants left and three contestants eliminated.

=== The Wildcard ===
Two of the 24 contestants who were eliminated at earlier rounds but have the highest votes from the audience on the Zalo app as well as on the Website SaoStar.vn will officially be qualified for the finale along with the eight contestants of four teams.

=== The Live Final ===
Ten finalists are divided into two groups; each contestant will perform one of their compositions (either in the previous submission or writing a new one). Voting will be opened when the first composition is performed and closed after the last composition finishes. The two candidates receiving the highest number of votes from the audience in two groups will move on to the second round and will be directly voted by 31 professional judges or media representatives. Candidates who received 16 votes first will be crowned the winner.

== Mentors and host ==
In November 2016, the judging panel for the first season was revealed as Nguyễn Hải Phong, Đức Trí, Lê Minh Sơn and Giáng Son. The first season was hosted by Nguyên Khang (former host of The X Factor Vietnam) and Linh Sunny (former host of The Voice of Vietnam)

For the second season in 2018, former The Voice Kids coach and music executive Hồ Hoài Anh replaced Nguyễn Hải Phong on the judging panel. Đức Trí, Lê Minh Sơn and Giáng Son all returned. The announcement was made on January 31, 2018.

== Series overview ==
- Team Nguyễn Hải Phong
- Team Đức Trí
- Team Giáng Son
- Team Lê Minh Sơn
- Team Hồ Hoài Anh

Season	Premiere	Finale	Winner	Runner-up	Winning mentor	Host(s)	Mentors (chair's order)			
Season	Premiere	Finale	Winner	Runner-up	Winning mentor	Host(s)	1	2	3	4
1	November 20, 2016	January 22, 2017	Cao Bá Hưng	Trương Thảo Nhi	Đức Trí	Nguyên Khang; Linh Sunny	Nguyễn Hải Phong	Đức Trí	Giáng Son	Lê Minh Sơn
2	March 4, 2018	May 13, 2018	Lộn Xộn Band	Trương Nguyễn Hoài Nam	Lê Minh Sơn	Phí Linh	Hồ Hoài Anh	Giáng Son	Đức Trí	Lê Minh Sơn

== Season synopses ==
Notes	Winner	Runner-up	Eliminated at the Live Final
Notes	Eliminated at the Battle Round	Eliminated at the Composition Round	Disqualified or Withdrew
Notes	Italicized are artists who were eliminated at the Composition and Battle Rounds but won the Wildcard Round and qualified for the Live Final		

=== Season 1 (2016) ===
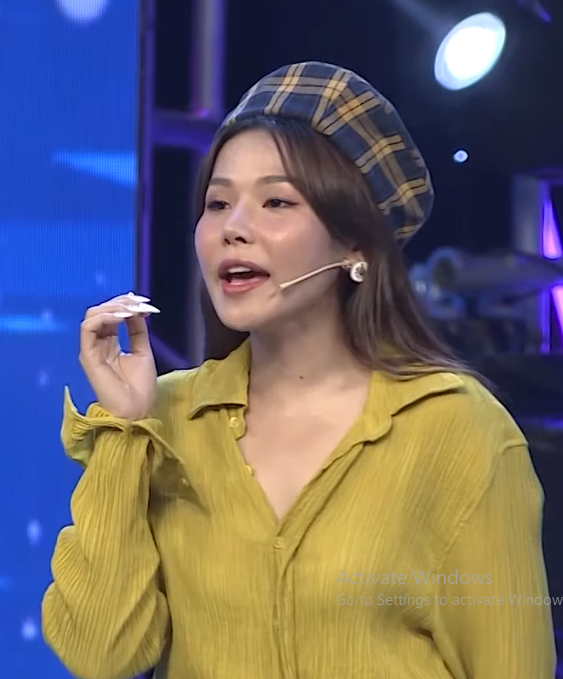
Trương Thảo Nhi, season one runner-up

Season 1 aired from 20 November 2016 to 22 January 2017 and was shown on VTV3, Vietnam, with four coaches for the first season are Nguyễn Hải Phong, Đức Trí, Giáng Son and Lê Minh Sơn. They mentored a team of eight people.

Mentor	Contestants			
Nguyễn Hải Phong	Bùi Công Nam	Phan Mạnh Quỳnh	Ưng Đại Vệ	Đoàn Thế Lân
Nguyễn Hải Phong	Vicky Nhung	Trần Dũng Khánh	Justyn Wesley	Hoàng Hồng Ngọc
Đức Trí	Cao Bá Hưng	Trương Kiều Diễm	Phạm Hồng Phước	MTV & Nguyễn Dân
Đức Trí	Trần Nguyễn Kim Ngân	Nguyễn Quân	Đào Bá Lộc	Nguyễn Thị Ngân Hà
Giáng Son	Trương Thảo Nhi	Nguyễn Hoàng Dũng	Hứa Kim Tuyền	Đinh Đức Thảo
Giáng Son	Lê Sỹ Tuệ	Lê Hữu Toàn	Bùi Mỹ Linh	~~Nguyễn Thanh Nhật Minh~~
Lê Minh Sơn	Lê Thiện Hiếu	Jak Nguyễn	Tia Hải Châu	Bùi Caroon
Lê Minh Sơn	Hoàng Minh Quý	Nguyễn Việt Dũng	Bùi Hoàng Nam Đức Anh	~~Phạm Trần Phương~~

=== Season 2 (2018) ===
Season 2 aired from March 4, 2018 to May 13, 2018 with four judges are Đức Trí, Lê Minh Sơn, Giáng Son and Hồ Hoài Anh. In the "recording round" of this season, each judge have to choose seven contestants (instead of eight in previous season) for their team to compete in "composition round", "battle round" and the "liveshow final". Only Đức Trí team had the eighth contestant**, thanks to production team's rule-breaking, due to judge's demand after watching this contestant's best performance.

Mentor	Contestants			
Hồ Hoài Anh	Trương Nguyễn Hoài Nam	Gin Tuấn Kiệt	Đinh Tuấn Anh	Bùi Lan Hương
Hồ Hoài Anh	Shin Hồng Vịnh	Hoàng Khả Linh	Dương Quốc Huy	—N/a
Giáng Son	RTee & Juun Đăng Dũng	Sa Huỳnh	Nguyễn Ngọc Tường Vy	Nhóm O-Plus
Giáng Son	Hoàng Thống	Nguyễn Hoàng Sơn	Vũ Bình Minh	—N/a
Đức Trí	Nguyễn Đình Khương	Dũng Hà Hakoota	Phạm Minh Triết	Nguyễn Minh Cường
Đức Trí	Nguyễn Hoàng Ly	Nguyễn Thành Đạt**	Nguyễn Kim Tuyên	Lê Minh Phương
Lê Minh Sơn	Lộn Xộn Band	Trần Khánh Ly	Dư Quốc Vương	Dật Hanh
Lê Minh Sơn	Trương Phước Lộc	Phạm Hoàng Duy	~~Jis Song Joo-young~~	—N/a

== See also ==
- List of broadcast programs of Vietnam Television (VTV) (in Vietnamese)
