= The X Factor Vietnam =

Vietnamese television music talent show

- Vietnamese: Nhân tố bí ẩn
- Created by: Simon Cowell
- Presented by: Nguyên Khang; Thu Thủy
- Judges: Hồ Quỳnh Hương; Dương Khắc Linh; Hồ Ngọc Hà; Đàm Vĩnh Hưng; Thanh Lam; Tùng Dương
- Country of origin: Vietnam
- Original language: Vietnamese
- No. of seasons: 3
- No. of episodes: 58

Production
- Producers: Cát Tiên Sa; Fremantle; Syco Entertainment
- Running time: 150 minutes

Original release
- Network: VTV3; YouTV
- Release: 30 March 2014 – 21 August 2016
- Release: September 29, 2026 – present

X-Factor/ Nhân tố bí ẩn is the Vietnamese version of The X Factor, a show originating from the United Kingdom. It is a television music talent show for aspiring pop singers drawn from public auditions. Based on the original UK show, and an addition to the X Factor franchise, the series found new singing talent (solo artists and groups ages 12 and over), drawn from public auditions, and they competed against each other for votes. The winner was determined by the show's viewers via telephone, the Internet, and SMS text voting, and was awarded a recording contract and 500 million VND.

== History ==
By the end of 2013, Cát Tiên Sa announced that they would produce The X Factor, a new singing competition, as a substitute for another television program, The Voice of Vietnam. The Vietnamese version of the show is called Nhân tố bí ẩn. In 2015, it was announced that the show will be airing once every two years, alternating with The Voice.

== Format ==
=== Categories ===
The show is primarily concerned with identifying singing talent, though appearance, personality, stage presence and dance routines are also an important element of many performances. Each judge is assigned one of four categories, to use their experience to help the artists. The categories are: "Boys" (aged 16–24 males), "Girls" (aged 16–24 females), "Over 25s" (solo acts aged 25 and over), and "Groups" (including duos). Through the live shows, the judges act as mentors to their category, helping to decide song choices, styling and staging, while judging contestants from other categories, and also vote to save or eliminate contestants.

=== Stages for seasons 1 ===
There are five stages to the competition:

- Stage 1: Producers' auditions (these auditions decide who will sing in front of the judges)
- Stage 2: Judges' auditions
- Stage 3: Six-chair challenge
- Stage 4: Judges' houses
- Stage 5: Live shows (finals)

=== Stages for seasons 2 ===
There are five stages to the competition:

- Stage 1: Producers' auditions (these auditions decide who will sing in front of the judges)
- Stage 2: Judges' auditions
- Stage 3: Boot camp
- Stage 4: Four-chair challenge & wildcard
- Stage 5: Live shows (finals)

Stages for Season 3

There are five stages to the competition:

The show allows solo artists and vocal groups aged 16 and above, with no upper age limit, to compete. Applicants first upload a video audition to the Internet. The show's producers will decide who is qualified for the Judges' auditions. The producers' auditions are not televised. A selection of the auditions in front of the judges – usually the best, the worst and the most bizarre – are broadcast during the first few weeks of the show. The judges' auditions are held in front of a live audience, and the acts sing over a backing track. If at least three judges say "yes", the act goes through to the next stage, otherwise they are eliminated.

=== Live shows ===
The live shows feature the contestants' live performances and also at the end of the night, reveal the results of the public voting, culminating in one or more acts being eliminated. A difference in judge's vote in the Vietnamese version and other countries' versions is that there will be a bottom three instead of bottom two every live show. The judges will vote to save one contestant in the bottom three from elimination, and then the result will be reverted to the earlier public votes. The actual number of votes cast for each act is not revealed, nor even the order.

Also, different from the UK version, four contestants advance to the finals instead of three.

== Judges ==
Shortly after the announcement to launch The X Factor, Hồ Quỳnh Hương was confirmed by Cát Tiên Sa as the first judge, while two former coaches from The Voice, Hồ Ngọc Hà and Đàm Vĩnh Hưng, were also announced to be joining the show. The fourth judge was not announced until the first day of filming the Judges' audition on March 4, 2014, Dương Khắc Linh was revealed as the last judge. Hồ Ngọc Hà and Đàm Vĩnh Hưng both quit before season 2 was launched. On the day the Judges' audition was filmed, the judging panel for season 2 was officially revealed with Dương Khắc Linh and Hồ Quỳnh Hương returning, while Thanh Lam and Tùng Dương replaced Hồ Ngọc Hà and Đàm Vĩnh Hưng respectively. and on June 5, 2026, The X Factor Vietnam The Third Season With Edition and made return of The Franchise After 10-years after a haitus, and based on the original British format The X Factor UK. and Making She Since The End of the two season. Dương Khắc Linh and Hồ Quỳnh Hương Thanh Lam Từng Dương All Returning As The Judges,

=== Judges' categories and their contestants ===
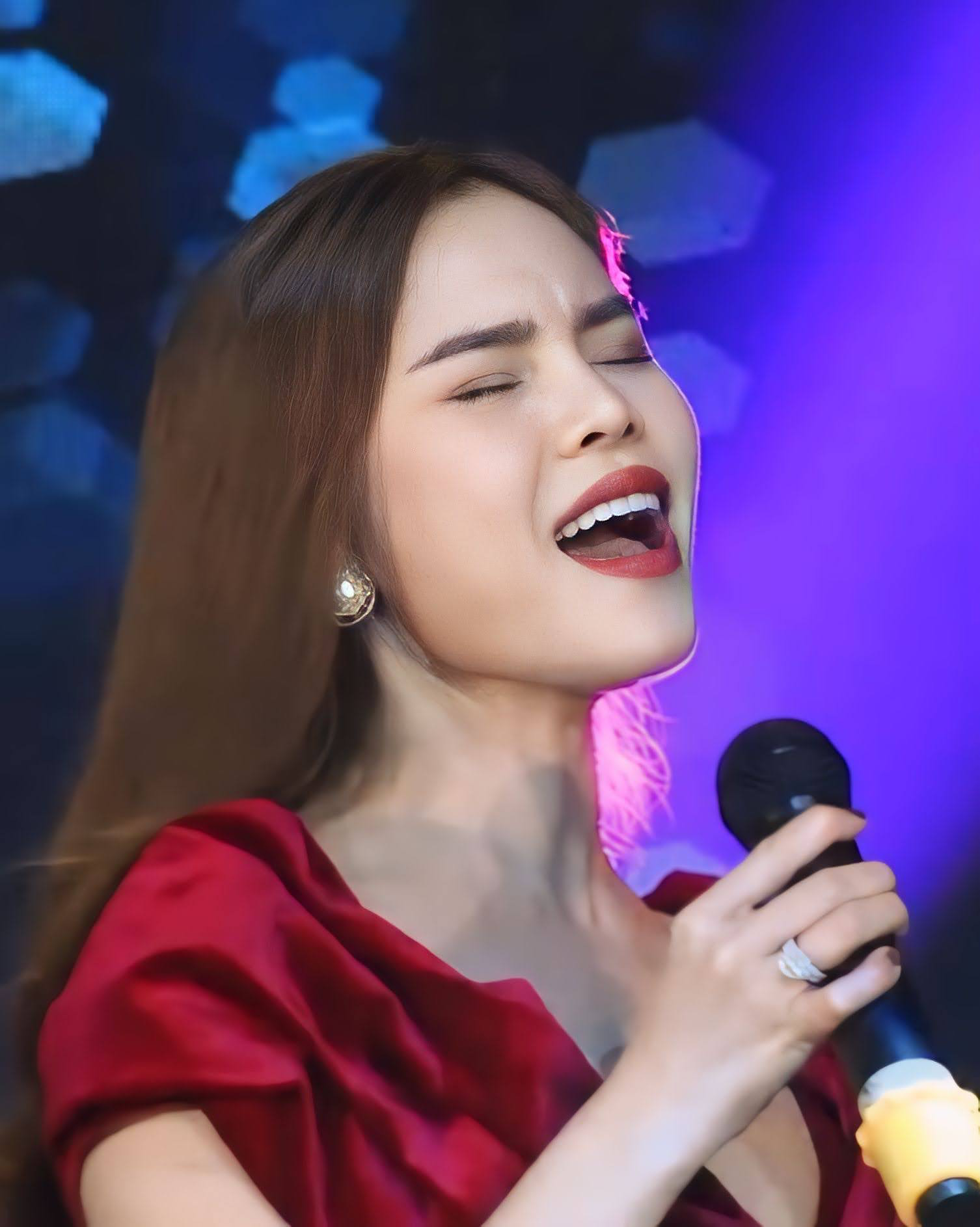
Giang Hồng Ngọc, season one winner

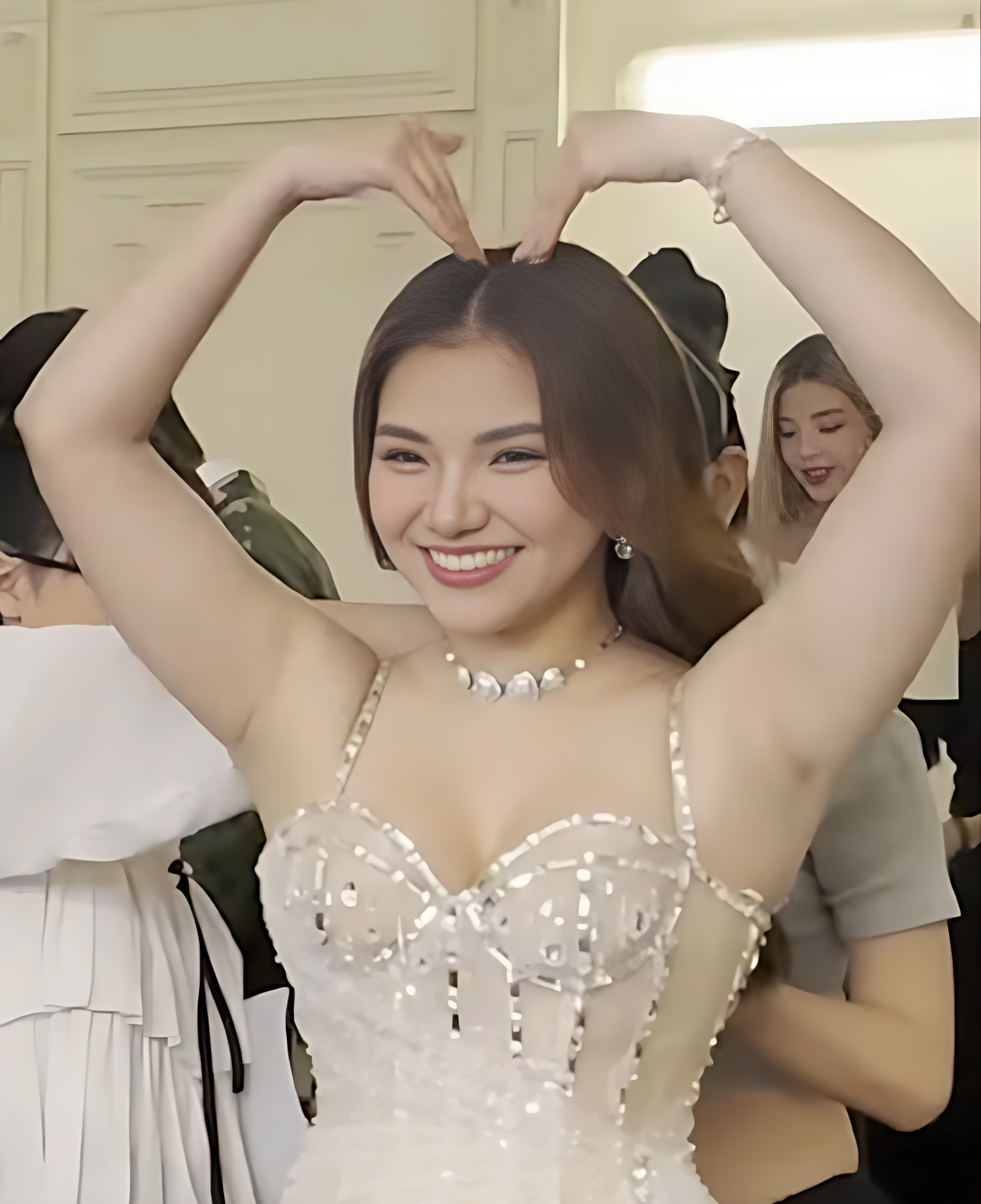
Myra Trần (Trần Minh Như), season two winner

In each season, each judge is given a category to mentor and chooses small three to four acts (normally three, the fourth act is usually a wildcard) to progress to the live finals. This table shows which category each judge was allocated and which acts he or she put through to the live finals.

– Winning judge/category. Winners are in bold, eliminated contestants in small font.

Season	Đàm Vĩnh Hưng	Hồ Quỳnh Hương	Hồ Ngọc Hà	Dương Khắc Linh
1	**Over 25s** Trần Quang Đại; Phạm Thị Hà Vân; Phạm Uyên Nguyên; Nguyễn Thùy Dương	**Boys**; Loki Bảo Long; Phạm Đình Thái Ngân; Lê Tích Kỳ; Phạm Chí Thành	**Girls**; **Giang Hồng Ngọc**; Sevinch; Khương Hoàn Mỹ; Nguyễn Minh Ngọc	**Groups**; O-plus; F-band; FB Boiz; Ayor
2	Tùng Dương	Hồ Quỳnh Hương	Thanh Lam	Dương Khắc Linh
2	**Boys**; Đặng Tuấn Phương; Lê Hoàng Phong; Trương Phúc Lộc	**Girls**; **Myra Trần**; Trương Kiều Diễm; Nguyễn Thị Thu Thủy	**Over 25s** Adam Lâm; Hoàng Thị Thanh Thảo; Phạm Chí Huy	**Groups**; The Wings; S Girls; Dolphins; F.O.E
**3**	Tùng Dương	Hồ Quỳnh Hương	Thanh Lam	Dương Khắc Linh

== Series overview ==
To date, two seasons have been broadcast, as summarized below. and Begin The Third Edition have been started

Contestant in (or mentor of) "Boys" category
Contestant in (or mentor of) "Girls" category
Contestant in (or mentor of) "Over 25s" category
Contestant in (or mentor of) "Groups" category

Season	Start	Finish	Winner	Runner-up	Winning mentor	Host(s)	Judges			
1	March 30, 2014	October 19, 2014	Giang Hồng Ngọc; Girls	O-Plus; Groups	Hồ Ngọc Hà	Nguyên Khang; Thu Thủy	Đàm Vĩnh Hưng	Hồ Quỳnh Hương	Hồ Ngọc Hà	Dương Khắc Linh
2	April 3, 2016	August 21, 2016	Trần Minh Như; Girls	Trương Kiều Diễm; Girls	Hồ Quỳnh Hương	Thành Trung; Gil Lê	Tùng Dương	Hồ Quỳnh Hương	Thanh Lam	Dương Khắc Linh
3	April 7, 2026	September 29, 2026	Upcoming Season			Thành Trung; Gil Lê	Tùng Dương	Hồ Quỳnh Hương	Thanh Lam	Dương Khắc Linh
