= Hồ Quỳnh Hương =

Vietnamese female singer (born 1980)

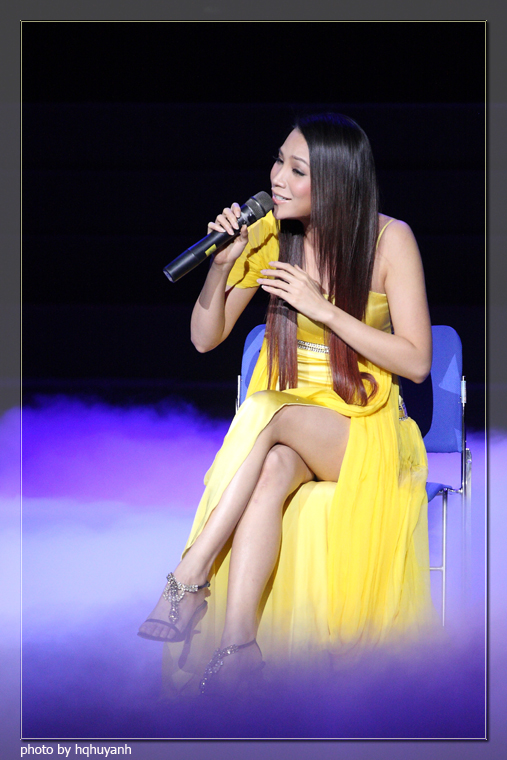
- Hồ Quỳnh Hương

Background information
- Born: Hồ Quỳnh Hương; 16 October 1980 (age 46); Hạ Long, Quảng Ninh, Vietnam
- Genres: V-pop; Pop; Ballad
- Instruments: Vocals

Hồ Quỳnh Hương (born 16 October 1980) is a Vietnamese singer. She has appeared in Asia Song Festival 2008, Bước nhảy hoàn vũ (season 1), Vietnam Idol (season 3) as a guest judge, Cặp đôi hoàn hảo (season 1), and The Voice of Vietnam (season 1) as an adviser. Hương was crowned as Asia's Sexiest Vegetarian Woman of 2013 by PETA Asia Pacific.
