= The Voice of Vietnam season 1 =

Season of television series

The Voice of Vietnam
- Season 1
- Hosted by: Phan Anh; V.Music band (backstage); Phương Mai (backstage)
- Judges: Đàm Vĩnh Hưng; Thu Minh; Hồ Ngọc Hà; Trần Lập
- Winner: Phạm Thị Hương Tràm
- Winning coach: Thu Minh
- Runner-up: Đinh Hương

Release
- Original network: VTV3
- Original release: July 8, 2012 – January 13, 2013

Season chronology
- Next → Season 2

The Voice of Vietnam's first season began on 8 July 2012 and ended on 13 January 2013. This series was part of the famous The Voice franchise and was based on the original version, The Voice of Holland. Four original coaches chosen were Đàm Vĩnh Hưng, Thu Minh, Hồ Ngọc Hà and Trần Lập.

This is the only series to feature Hồ Ngọc Hà and Trần Lập as coaches. Phạm Thị Hương Tràm was announced as the winner on January 13, 2013. A lot of contestants in this season then achieved certain successes and notable hit songs. This season proved to be a hit and the show was therefore renewed for a second season in the same year.

== Teams ==
- Winner
- Runner-up
- Third/ Fourth Places
- Eliminated in the Liveshows
- Eliminated in the Battles
- Withdrew

| Coach | Top 56 artists | | | | |
|---|---|---|---|---|---|
| Trần Lập | | | | | |
| Trần Lập | Nguyễn Kiên Giang | Trần Thị Kim Loan | Nguyễn Thùy Linh | Nguyễn Văn Thắng | Nguyễn Hoài Bảo Anh |
| Trần Lập | Huỳnh Anh Tuấn | Nguyễn Thị Thảo Nguyên | Trần Thị Thanh Thủy | Đỗ Lệ Quyên | K'sor Đức |
| Trần Lập | Nguyễn Quốc Dũng | Lương Minh Trí | Nguyễn Hoàng Triều | Hà Văn Đông | |
| Thu Minh | | | | | |
| Thu Minh | Phạm Thị Hương Tràm | Nguyễn Trúc Nhân | Đỗ Xuân Sơn | Dương Trần Nghĩa | Nguyễn Khánh Phương Linh |
| Thu Minh | Đặng Thị Thu Thủy | Phạm Thị Ngân Bình | Dương Quốc Huy | Nguyễn Phú Luân | Mai Khánh Linh |
| Thu Minh | Trần Nguyên Long | Nguyễn Ngọc Gia Bảo | Hoàng Thị Uyên | Nguyễn Đức Quang | |
| Đàm Vĩnh Hưng | | | | | |
| Đàm Vĩnh Hưng | Lê Phạm Xuân Nghi | Đồng Lan | Phan Ngọc Luân | Vũ Thanh Hằng | Nguyễn Trọng Khương |
| Đàm Vĩnh Hưng | Phạm Dũng Hà | Nguyễn Quỳnh Trang | Trần Hoàng Anh | Hoàng Mạnh | Đặng Mai Anh |
| Đàm Vĩnh Hưng | Nguyễn Trinh Diễm My | Đinh Thị Thu Thùy | Vũ Kim Cương | Đặng Thị Hoài Trinh | |
| Hồ Ngọc Hà | | | | | |
| Hồ Ngọc Hà | Đinh Thị Thanh Hương | Bùi Anh Tuấn | Tiêu Châu Như Quỳnh | Đào Bá Lộc | Nguyễn Thị Thái Trinh |
| Hồ Ngọc Hà | Nguyễn Hương Giang | Thiều Bảo Trang | Phạm Hữu Thuận | Trang Quốc Cường | Kiều Minh Quyền |
| Hồ Ngọc Hà | Bùi Caroon | Lê Thị Lê Vy | Trần Hồng Dương | Nguyễn Hoàng Đức | |

== Episodes ==
=== Episodes 1-4: Blind Auditions (4 Parts) ===
Starting from July 8 to July 29 at 9:30 pm – 11:30 pm slot, preceded by Đồ Rê Mí 2012.

==== Episode 1: Blind Auditions, Week 1 ====
The first Blind Audition taped episode was broadcast on July 8, 2012.

| Coach hit his/her 'TÔI CHỌN BẠN' button | Contestant eliminated with no coach pressing his/her 'TÔI CHỌN BẠN' button | Contestant defaulted to this coach's team | Contestant elected to join this coach's team |

| Order | Contestant | Song | Coaches' and Contestants' Choices | | | |
| Order | Contestant | Song | Đàm Vĩnh Hưng | Thu Minh | Hồ Ngọc Hà | Trần Lập |
|---|---|---|---|---|---|---|
| 1 | Nguyễn Văn Thắng _{26, from Thanh Hóa} | "Quán cóc" _{(The Kiosk)} | — | | — | |
| 2 | Đặng Thị Hoài Trinh _{27, from Ho Chi Minh City} | "I Surrender" | | — | — | — |
| 3 | Lê Vũ Phương _{25, from Kiên Giang} | "Giấc mơ mùa thu" _{(Autumn Dream)} | — | — | — | — |
| 4 | Mai Khánh Linh _{19, from Hanoi} | "One Night Only" | — | | — | — |
| 5 | Trang Quốc Cường _{25, from Ho Chi Minh City} | "All by Myself" | — | — | | — |
| 6 | Đào Bá Lộc _{19, from Ho Chi Minh City} | "Criminal" | | | | — |
| 7 | Bùi Hà Phương _{22, from Hanoi} | "Mùa đông sẽ qua" _{(The Winter Will Pass)} | — | — | — | — |
| 8 | Nguyễn Phú Luân _{25, from Ho Chi Minh City} | "You Raise Me Up" | — | | | — |
| 9 | Nguyễn Khánh Phương Linh _{21, from Hanoi} | "Valerie" | — | | | — |
| 10 | Đỗ Xuân Sơn _{23, from Ho Chi Minh City} | "Đường về xa xôi" _{(Long Way Back)} | — | | | — |
| 11 | Phạm Trần Thanh Phương _{24, from Ho Chi Minh City} | "Hurt" | — | — | — | — |
| 12 | Đinh Thị Thanh Hương _{24, from Quảng Trị} | "Warwick Avenue" | | | | |
| 16* | Nguyễn Hương Giang _{21, from Hanoi} | "Đừng ngoảnh lại" _{(Don't Turn Back)} | — | — | | |
| 17 | Lê Thị Lê Vy _{24, from Hanoi} | "Dấu phố em qua" _{(The Paths I've Walked)} | — | — | | — |
| 18 | Ngô Duy Khiêm _{24, from Ho Chi Minh City} | "Ghen" _{(Jealous)} | — | — | — | — |
| 19 | Phạm Thị Hương Tràm _{17, from Nghệ An} | "I Will Always Love You" | | | | |

- Three unnamed contestants auditioned between Đinh T Thanh Hương and Nguyễn Hương Giang. None of the coaches turned during their auditions, hence they were eliminated.

==== Episode 2: Blind Auditions, Week 2 ====
The second Blind Audition taped episode was broadcast on July 15, 2012.

| Order | Contestant | Song | Coaches' and Contestants' Choices | | | |
| Order | Contestant | Song | Đàm Vĩnh Hưng | Thu Minh | Hồ Ngọc Hà | Trần Lập |
|---|---|---|---|---|---|---|
| 1 | Ksor Đức _{28, from Gia Lai} | "Giọt đắng" _{(A Bitter Drop)} | — | — | — | |
| 2 | Hoàng Thị Uyên _{28, from Đắk Lắk} | "Niềm hy vọng" _{(Hope)} | | | — | |
| 3 | Phạm Phương Dung _{33, from Ho Chi Minh City} | "Nơi thời gian ngừng lại" _{(Where Time Stops)} | — | — | — | — |
| 4 | Phan Ngọc Luân _{23, from Ho Chi Minh City} | "Whataya Want from Me" | | | | |
| 5 | Hoàng Mạnh _{24, from Da Nang} | "Sway" | | — | — | — |
| 6 | Kính Tư An Nghi _{16, from Ho Chi Minh City} | "Crazy Woman" | — | — | — | — |
| 7 | Trần Thị Kim Loan _{38, from Đồng Nai} | "Chỉ còn tôi với tôi" _{(There's Me and Myself Left)} | | — | — | |
| 8 | Đinh Thị Thu Thùy _{26, from Vĩnh Phúc} | "Thu cạn" _{(The Drained Autumn)} | | — | — | |
| 9 | Nguyễn Thùy Linh _{21, from Hanoi} | "This Masquerade" | — | — | — | |
| 13 | Lê Phạm Xuân Nghi _{23, from Ho Chi Minh City} | "Listen" | | | | |
| 14 | Huỳnh Anh Tuấn _{30, from Ho Chi Minh City} | "You'll Be in My Heart" | — | — | | |
| 15 | Bùi Caroon _{23, from Phú Yên} | "Love Potion No. 9" | | — | | |
| 16 | Hoàng Nam Hải _{19, from Hai Phong} | "Một lần được yêu" _{(One Time for Love)} | — | — | — | — |
| 17 | Nguyễn Đức Quang _{29, from Ho Chi Minh City} | "Có nhau trọn đời" _{(Together Forever)} | — | | — | — |
| 18 | Nguyễn Kiên Giang _{29, from Ninh Bình} | "My Way" | — | | — | |
| 19 | Hà Văn Đông _{20, from Ho Chi Minh City} | "Tâm hồn của đá" _{(Soul of a Rock)} | | † | † | |

- †: Coach Trần Lập pushed Thu Minh and Hồ Ngọc Hà's buttons.

==== Episode 3: Blind Auditions, Week 3 ====
The third Blind Audition taped episode was broadcast on July 21, 2012.

| Order | Contestant | Song | Coaches' and Contestants' Choices | | | |
| Order | Contestant | Song | Đàm Vĩnh Hưng | Thu Minh | Hồ Ngọc Hà | Trần Lập |
|---|---|---|---|---|---|---|
| 1 | Dương Quốc Huy _{20, from Vũng Tàu} | "I Don't Wanna Miss a Thing" | — | | — | |
| 2 | Nguyễn Hoàng Triều _{20, from Quảng Ngãi} | "Ngôi sao trong đêm" _{(A Star in the Night)} | — | — | — | |
| 3 | Tạ Châm Anh _{25, from Hanoi} | "Someone Like You" | — | — | — | — |
| 4 | Vũ Kim Cương _{32, from Hanoi} | "Mona Lisa" | | — | — | — |
| 5 | Nguyễn Trọng Khương _{27, from Ho Chi Minh City} | "You Raise Me Up" | | | — | — |
| 6 | Nguyễn Trinh Diễm My _{27, from Ho Chi Minh City} | "The Power of Love" | | | — | |
| 10 | Nguyễn Hoàng Đức _{24, from Hanoi} | "Sorry Seems to be the Hardest Word" | — | — | | — |
| 11 | Nguyễn Thị Thái Trinh _{18, from Ho Chi Minh City} | "Give Me One Reason" | | | | |
| 12 | Nguyễn Trường Sinh _{22, from Ho Chi Minh City} | "Nếu điều đó xảy ra" _{(If It Happened)} | — | — | — | — |
| 13 | Kiều Minh Quyền | "Hurry Home" | —N/a | —N/a | * | —N/a |
| 14 | Đỗ Lệ Quyên _{20, from Ho Chi Minh City} | "Bài ca trên đồi" _{(The Song on the Hill)} | — | — | — | |
| 15 | Nguyễn Quốc Dũng _{23, from Ho Chi Minh City} | "Goodbye My Lover" | — | — | — | |
| 16 | Trần Hoàng Anh _{from Hanoi} | "Mơ làm người lớn" _{(Wish to Grow Up)} | | — | — | — |
| 17 | Lê Minh Mẫn _{27, from Ho Chi Minh City} | "60 năm cuộc đời" _{(60 Years of Life)} | — | — | — | — |
| 18 | Nguyễn Trúc Nhân _{21, from Ho Chi Minh City} | "Mercy" | — | | — | — |
| 19 | Đặng Thị Thu Thủy _{25, from Hanoi} | "If I Ain't Got You" | | | | |
| 20 | Dương Trần Nghĩa _{27, from Hanoi} | "Angels" | — | | | |

- Only Hồ Ngọc Hà was shown choosing the contestant.

==== Episode 4: Blind Auditions, Week 4 ====
The final Blind Audition taped episode was broadcast on July 29, 2012.

| Order | Contestant | Song | Coaches' and Contestants' Choices | | | |
| Order | Contestant | Song | Đàm Vĩnh Hưng | Thu Minh | Hồ Ngọc Hà | Trần Lập |
|---|---|---|---|---|---|---|
| 1 | Nguyễn Ngọc Gia Bảo | "I Love Rock 'n' Roll" | — | | — | — |
| 2 | Lương Minh Trí | "Feeling Good" | — | — | — | |
| 3 | Nguyễn Thị Thảo Nguyên _{20, from Ho Chi Minh City} | "Zombie" | — | — | — | |
| 4 | Trần Nguyên Long _{27, from Ho Chi Minh City} | "Beat It" | — | | † | — |
| 5 | Trần Thị Tố Ny _{19, from Da Nang} | "Ngựa ô thương nhớ" _{(Dark Horse in Love)} | — | — | — | — |
| 6 | Thiều Bảo Trang _{21, from Hanoi} | "Rolling in the Deep" | | | | |
| 7 | Trần Hồng Dương | "Anh sẽ nhớ mãi" _{(I Will Remember Forever)} | —N/a | — | | —N/a |
| 8 | Nguyễn Quỳnh Trang _{from Hanoi} | "Hãy về với em" _{(Come Back to Me)} | | —N/a | —N/a | —N/a |
| 9 | Trần Thị Thanh Thủy | "You Lost Me" | — | — | — | |
| 10 | Đặng Mai Anh _{21, from Da Nang} | "Any Man of Mine" | | — | — | — |
| 11 | Bùi Anh Tuấn _{21, from Ho Chi Minh City} | "Nơi tình yêu bắt đầu" _{(Where Love Starts)} | | — | | — |
| 12 | Vũ Thanh Hằng _{25, from Hanoi} | "Falling" | | | — | |
| 16 | Tiêu Châu Như Quỳnh _{20, from Ho Chi Minh City} | "I Will Survive" | | | | |
| 17 | Phạm Dũng Hà _{31, from Ho Chi Minh City} | "You Know I'm No Good" | | — | | |
| 18 | Đồng Lan _{29, from Hải Dương} | "La Vie en Rose" | | | | |
| 19 | Nguyễn Hoài Bảo Anh _{20, from Ho Chi Minh City} | "Safe & Sound" | Team Full | | — | |
| 20 | Phạm Thị Ngân Bình _{from Ho Chi Minh City} | "How Did I Fall in Love With You" | Team Full | | | Team Full |
| 21 | Phạm Hữu Thuận _{21, from Ho Chi Minh City} | "At Last" | Team Full | Team Full | | Team Full |

- †: Coach Thu Minh pushed Hồ Ngọc Hà's button.

=== Episodes 5-8: The Battle Rounds (4 Weeks) ===
Starting from August 19 to September 16 at 9:00 pm – 10:30 pm slot, preceded by Vietnam's Next Top Model.

Coaches begin narrowing down the playing field by training the contestants with the help of "trusted advisors." Each episode features battles consisting of pairings from within each team, and each battle concludes with the respective coach eliminating one of the two contestants. Seven winners for each coach advance to the live shows.

– Battle Winner

| Week/Order | Coach | Contestant | Contestant | Song |
|---|---|---|---|---|
| 1.1 | Đàm Vĩnh Hưng | Quỳnh Trang | Hoàng Anh | "Tình bỗng dưng khác" (Love Suddenly Turns Wrong) |
| 1.2 | Trần Lập | Thanh Thủy | Bảo Anh | "Somebody That I Used to Know" |
| 1.3 | Hồ Ngọc Hà | Đào Bá Lộc | Hữu Thuận | "Well, Well, Well" |
| 1.4 | Thu Minh | Quốc Huy | Ngân Bình | "(Everything I Do) I Do It For You" |
| 1.5 | Trần Lập | Đỗ Lệ Quyên | Kim Loan | "Góc tối" (Dark Corner) |
| 1.6 | Đàm Vĩnh Hưng | Hoàng Mạnh | Ngọc Luân | "Another One Bites the Dust" |
| 1.7 | Hồ Ngọc Hà | Bùi Anh Tuấn | Hồng Dương | "Cảm ơn tình yêu tôi" (Thank You My Love) |
| 2.1 | Thu Minh | Đỗ Xuân Sơn | Nguyễn Phú Luân | "Radio" |
| 2.2 | Trần Lập | Huỳnh Anh Tuấn | K'sor Đức | "Into the Night" |
| 2.3 | Hồ Ngọc Hà | Thái Trinh | Trang Quốc Cường | "Ain't No Sunshine" |
| 2.4 | Đàm Vĩnh Hưng | Mai Anh | Dũng Hà | "There You Were" |
| 2.5 | Thu Minh | Phương Linh | Mai Khánh Linh | "Price Tag" |
| 2.6 | Trần Lập | Thảo Nguyên | Quốc Dũng | "Payphone" |
| 2.7 | Đàm Vĩnh Hưng | Diễm My | Xuân Nghi | "When You Believe" |
| 3.1 | Hồ Ngọc Hà | Minh Quyền | Hương Giang | "Tình về nơi đâu" (Where Do We Go) |
| 3.2 | Trần Lập | Kiên Giang | Minh Trí | "Alone" |
| 3.3 | Thu Minh | Gia Bảo | Đặng Thị Thu Thủy | "Fallin'" |
| 3.4 | Đàm Vĩnh Hưng | Trọng Khương | Thu Thùy | "Hương xưa" (Old Scent) |
| 3.5 | Hồ Ngọc Hà | Bùi Caroon | Tiêu Châu Như Quỳnh | "Stronger (What Doesn't Kill You)" |
| 3.6 | Trần Lập | Thùy Linh | Hoàng Triều | "Lặng thầm một tình yêu" (I'm Forbidden) |
| 3.7 | Thu Minh | Trần Nguyên Long | Dương Trần Nghĩa | "Moves Like Jagger" |
| 4.1 | Thu Minh | Trúc Nhân | Hoàng Uyên | "Ngày của tôi" (My Day) |
| 4.2 | Hồ Ngọc Hà | Lê Vy | Bảo Trang | "Bleeding Love" |
| 4.3 | Đàm Vĩnh Hưng | Hoài Trinh | Thanh Hằng | "No One" |
| 4.4 | Hồ Ngọc Hà | Đinh Thị Thanh Hương | Hoàng Đức | "Dedication to My Ex (Miss That)" |
| 4.5 | Đàm Vĩnh Hưng | Vũ Kim Cương | Đồng Lan | "Dream a Little Dream of Me" |
| 4.6 | Trần Lập | Văn Thắng | Hà Văn Đông | "Người đàn bà hóa đá" (The Woman Who Turns to Stone) |
| 4.7 | Thu Minh | Hương Tràm | Đức Quang | "The Prayer" |

=== Episodes 9-20: Liveshows (11 Liveshows and 1 Finale) ===
Starting from September 23 to January 13 at 9:00 pm – 11:30 pm slot.

Detailed results

| – | Contestant has to sing off |
| – | Contestant receives the fewest votes and is eliminated immediately (no final showdown) |
| - | Contestant is saved by the coach |
| - | Contestant is saved by public vote |
| – | Contestant does not perform that week |
| – | Contestant withdraws from the show |

| | Week 1+2 | Week 3+4 | Week 5 | Week 6 | Week 7 | Week 8 | Week 9 | Week 10 | Week 11 | Week 12 |
TEAM THU MINH
| Phạm Thị Hương Tràm | Safe | | Safe | | Safe | | Safe | | Safe | WINNER |
| Nguyễn Trúc Nhân | Safe | | Safe | | Safe | | Safe | | Eliminated (Week 11) | |
| Đỗ Xuân Sơn | Safe | | Safe | | Sing-Off | | Eliminated (Week 9) | | | |
| Dương Trần Nghĩa | Safe | | Sing-Off | | Sing-Off | Eliminated (Week 7) | | | | |
| Nguyễn Khánh Phương Linh | Sing-Off | | Sing-Off | Eliminated (Week 5) | | | | | | |
| Đặng Thị Thu Thủy | Sing-Off | Eliminated (Week 2) | | | | | | | | |
| Phạm Thị Ngân Bình | Sing-Off | Eliminated (Week 2) | | | | | | | | |
TEAM TRẦN LẬP
| Nguyễn Kiên Giang | Safe | | Safe | | Safe | | Safe | | Safe | 3rd/4th Place |
| Trần Thị Kim Loan | Safe | | Safe | | Safe | | Safe | | Eliminated (Week 11) | |
| Nguyễn Thùy Linh | Safe | | Safe | | Sing-Off | | Eliminated (Week 9) | | | |
| Nguyễn Văn Thắng | Safe | | Sing-Off | | Sing-Off | Eliminated (Week 7) | | | | |
| Nguyễn Hoài Bảo Anh | Sing-Off | | Sing-Off | Eliminated (Week 5) | | | | | | |
| Huỳnh Anh Tuấn | Sing-Off | Eliminated (Week 2) | | | | | | | | |
| Nguyễn Thị Thảo Nguyên | Sing-Off | Eliminated (Week 2) | | | | | | | | |
TEAM HỒ NGỌC HÀ
| Đinh Thị Thanh Hương | | Safe | | Safe | | Safe | | Safe | Safe | Runner-Up |
| Bùi Anh Tuấn | | Safe | | Safe | | Safe | | Safe | Eliminated (Week 11) | |
| Tiêu Châu Như Quỳnh | | Sing-Off | | Safe | | Sing-Off | | Eliminated (Week 10) | | |
| Đào Bá Lộc | | Safe | | Sing-Off | | Sing-Off | Eliminated (Week 8) | | | |
| Nguyễn Thị Thái Trinh | | Safe | | Sing-Off | Eliminated (Week 6) | | | | | |
| Nguyễn Hương Giang | | Sing-Off | Eliminated (Week 4) | | | | | | | |
| Thiều Bảo Trang | | Withdrew | Eliminated (Week 4) | | | | | | | |
TEAM ĐÀM VĨNH HƯNG
| Lê Phạm Xuân Nghi | | Sing-Off | | Safe | | Safe | | Safe | Safe | 3rd/4th Place |
| Đồng Lan | | Safe | | Safe | | Safe | | Safe | Eliminated (Week 11) | |
| Phan Ngọc Luân | | Safe | | Safe | | Sing-Off | | Eliminated (Week 10) | | |
| Vũ Thanh Hằng | | Safe | | Sing-Off | | Sing-Off | Eliminated (Week 8) | | | |
| Nguyễn Trọng Khương | | Safe | | Sing-Off | Eliminated (Week 6) | | | | | |
| Phạm Dũng Hà | | Sing-Off | Eliminated (Week 4) | | | | | | | |
| Nguyễn Quỳnh Trang | | Sing-Off | Eliminated (Week 4) | | | | | | | |

== Contestants on other programs ==
Let's Get Loud

- Lê Thị Lê Vy (2010 contestant)
- Dương Trần Nghĩa (2010 first runner-up)

Project Superstar Vietnam

- Nguyễn Đức Quang (2007 second runner-up)
- Hoàng Thị Uyên (2008 second runner-up)
- Tiêu Châu Như Quỳnh (2009 winner)
- Nguyễn Phú Luân (2009 second runner-up)
- Hoàng Mạnh (2011 contestant)
- Bùi Anh Tuấn (2011 winner)

Sao Mai điểm hẹn / Sao Mai

- Trần Hoàng Anh (season 4 finalist), eliminated in week 3
- Phan Ngọc Luân (season 4 finalist), eliminated in week 3
- Mai Khánh Linh (season 4 finalist), eliminated in week 5
- Nguyễn Đức Quang (Sao Mai 2009 contestant)
- Thiều Bảo Trang (Sao Mai 2011 contestant)

Song ca cùng thần tượng

- Phan Ngọc Luân with Đàm Vĩnh Hưng
- Nguyễn Văn Thắng with Hồ Quỳnh Hương
- K'sor Đức with Siu Black

Tiếng ca học đường

- Nguyễn Hoài Bảo Anh (2008 contestant)
- Tiêu Châu Như Quỳnh (2009 second runner-up)

Vietnam's Got Talent

- Phạm Trần Thanh Phương and Đinh Thị Thanh Hương (season 1 contestants)
- Nguyễn Ngọc Gia Bảo (season 1 semifinalist), eliminated in the 4th semifinal round

Vietnam Idol

- Trần Hoàng Anh (season 2 finalist, placed 9th)
- Phan Ngọc Luân (season 2 semifinalist, season 3 contestant)
- Nguyễn Văn Thắng (season 3 semifinalist)
- Hà Văn Đông (season 3 contestant)
- Lê Vũ Phương (season 4 contestant)
- Ngô Duy Khiêm (season 4 contestant)
- Trần Thị Tố Ny (season 4 contestant)
- Nguyễn Hương Giang (season 4 finalist, placed 4th)

Others

- Ngô Duy Khiêm and Nguyễn Thị Thái Trinh gained notoriety as Internet memes for covering famous songs.
- Trần Thị Kim Loan was the first season winner of Tiếng hát mãi xanh.
- Hoàng Mạnh also belonged to Mỹ Lệ's group in Hợp ca tranh tài.
- Nguyễn Đức Quang is a member of Artista group.
- Vũ Thanh Hằng was a contestant of House of Dream: Sáng bừng sức sống, eliminated in the grand finale.
- Tiêu Châu Như Quỳnh was a main singer of Bước nhảy hoàn vũ
- Trần Hồng Dương is a member of M4U group.
- Lương Minh Trí is the main vocalist of rock group Nu Voltage.
- Phạm Dũng Hà won Material Prize at Vietnam Collection Grand Prix 2001, also took part in Vietnam Fashion Week 2001.

== Controversy ==
On Sunday, September 9, 2012, a video was uploaded on YouTube by an anonymous account stating that the show's results were fixed. The video was deleted a few hours later; however, it was spread on social networks upon its deletion and caused a media uproar. The video showed email exchanges between who was believed to be The Voice's music director and several contestants and a recording between the director and a producer of the show. An urgent meeting was called at Cát Tiên Sa's headquarter a day later with the coaches and on-going as well as eliminated contestants. Phương Uyên - the show's music director apologized for what had happened but did not comment on the rumor about her close relationship with a contestant of the show, which was pointed out in the said video. H'zina Bya, who was said to quit because of being treated unfairly, explained the reason she quit was because of her health problem and thought that the show didn't fit her.
