= Việt Tú =

Vietnamese stage director, screenwriter, producer and event organizer

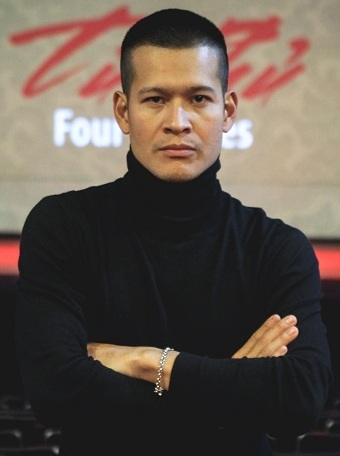
- Việt Tú on the stage of Four Palaces, January 2018, in Hanoi
- Born: Nguyễn Việt Tú; 17 February 1977 (age 49); Hà Nội
- Education: Vietnam National Academy of Music; Hanoi Academy of Theatre and Cinema
- Occupations: Director; Producer
- Years active: 1995-present
- Known for: Nhật thực Đẹp's Fashion Show; Sao Mai điểm hẹn Con đường âm nhạc Bài hát yêu thích Hồ Ngọc Hà Live Concert 2011; Giai điệu tự hào 2010 Miss Vietnam; 2003 Southeast Asian Games; Four Palaces; Sao đại chiến Cocofest 2018

Nguyễn Việt Tú (born February 17, 1977, in Hanoi) is a Vietnamese stage director, screenwriter, producer and event organizer. Việt Tú emerged from a young age as director of many major music programs, including most notably the Nhật thực (Eclipse) live show in 2002 and the popular music video series on VTV Bài hát tôi yêu (VTV's My Favorite Songs). At the age of 26, he became the art director for the opening and closing ceremonies of the 22nd Southeast Asian Games in 2003 in Vietnam which was broadcast live to all countries in the region.

Việt Tú is a top director in the field of music producing, being the first director of the Sao Mai điểm hẹn (2004) and creating Con đường âm nhạc (The Music Path, 2005), and many concert tours for several top artists such as Tùng Dương, Rain, Hồ Ngọc Hà, Trần Thu Hà, Phạm Thu Hà, etc. Those successes have helped him become a prestigious director in major performing arts events such as 2010 Miss Vietnam, Viettel kết nối triệu tâm hồn (Viettel – When Souls Connect, 2018), Đại Hỉ Xuân (Vin ID – Grand Spring Celebration, 2017), Bài hát yêu thích (The Favorite Songs, 2012–2015), Giai điệu tự hào (Proud Melodies, 2014), 2015 Vietnam's Night In Moscow, Vinhomes Center Park Opening (2016), Sao Đại Chiến (Celebrities Battle, 2017), Cocofest Music Festival or We Choice Awards (2018).

In addition to music, Việt Tú is also the director of other cultural events such as the 2008 International Day of Vesak in Vietnam. He was also the director of Đẹp's Fashion Show (2005–present), the theatrical fashion show Cơn ác mộng của người thợ may (Nightmare of a Tailor, 2006). Việt Tú is also the favorite choice of major brands of the world and Vietnam such as Hermès, Vietnam Airlines, Rolls-Royce, Vingroup, etc.

In 2011, he established Dream Studio, directly producing music products for local and foreign artists, especially the production of the album Classic Meets Chillout (2012) and Vietnam's first real-landscape performance Thuở ấy Xứ Đoài (Once Upon A Time in Doai Province, 2017). Weekly performance Tứ Phủ (Four Palaces, 2015–present), presenting the Practices related to Viet beliefs in Mother Goddesses and being made by his company Viet Theatre, also received many positive reviews from the audiences as it is always in the top 3 cultural destinations for international visitors in Hanoi.

Việt Tú is the most successful director at the Dedication Music Award with 5 awards and 8 nominations. Earlier, he was also awarded the Breakthrough Award for the Nhật thực and won the VTV Bài hát tôi yêu twice. His works have been selected by the Vietnamese Ministry of Culture, Sports and Tourism as the "Typical cultural Event of the Year".

== Biography ==
Nguyễn Việt Tú was born in 1977 in Hanoi in a three generation artist family. His grandfather is a stage director, his mother was a water puppet artist at Thăng Long Water Puppet Theater. His father was a TV director working at Vietnam Television (VTV).

In 1991, Việt Tú entered Vietnam National Academy of Music. Although he had a passion for drum and guitar, he studied clarinet and met his close friend – the young star Trần Thu Hà. However, study performance of Việt Tú at the academy was not outstanding. Supported by his family, his passion for filmmaking led him to the film director department of Hanoi Academy of Theatre and Cinema in 1995.

Since 1997, he has started practicing at Vietnam Television, in charge of director of photography, music video and music stage. After graduating in 1999, Việt Tú stayed at VTV until September 2005, concurrently joining a training course about contemporary art, theater management and entertainment in New York Film Academy.

== Career ==
=== Music director ===
As a trainee in Vietnam Television, Việt Tú joined and succeeded with a completely new independent program called Những bài hát trong phim (OST video music), introducing to the audience songs such as "Bài ca trên đỉnh núi", "Hoa sữa", "Đời gọi em biết bao lần", etc. Moreover, at VTV, he gave it a try on VTV Bài hát yêu thích (VTV's My Favorites Songs), making music video for the song "Mùa đông sẽ qua" by singer Mỹ Linh.

In early 2002, Trần Thu Hà invited Việt Tú to be in charge of the Nhật thực (Eclipse) live show. Two successful shows with excellent visual effects on April 12 and 13, 2002 at Hanoi Cultural Friendship Palace made a resounding success for Việt Tú's musical director career. Soon after that, he continued his success with the music video for the song "Sói non ngơ ngác" by singer Kasim Hoàng Vũ, winning the award by the art council.

In 2003, Việt Tú and VTV planned to launch a new contest for the light music market. In order to distinguish them from the national singing festival Sao Mai, they set up the Sao Mai điểm hẹn, which was launched in 2004 with Việt Tú as the director. The success of 2004 Sao Mai điểm hẹn was very impressive from the content, quality, to the introduction of various young talented singers such as Tùng Dương, Kasim Hoàng Vũ, Phương Anh, Nguyễn Hồng Nhung, Ngọc Khuê, Lưu Hương Giang, etc., helping the production team win the "Music Program of the Year" award at the Dedication Music Award in 2005.

Since 2003, Vietnam Television also wanted to launch a new music program that honored elderly musicians and artists. Originated from the idea of Việt Tú, after two years of preparation, the first episode of the Con đường âm nhạc (The Music Path) with composer Phú Quang was released in early 2005 including screenwriter Chu Minh Vũ, director Việt Tú, MC Đỗ Trung Quân and music director Trần Thanh Phương. The following Con đường âm nhạc episodes honored famous Vietnamese musicians such as Dương Thụ, Nguyễn Cường, Thanh Tùng and Phó Đức Phương, which attracted many famous artists to participate, making resounding success. All these performances obtained wonderful reviews from audiences.

After five episodes of the Con đường âm nhạc, at the end of 2005, Việt Tú went to the United States to study the major of contemporary art, theater management and entertainment. Soon after that, he was the only Vietnamese director to collaborate with a Korean crew on Rain's Vietnam Tour in June 2005.

In parallel with the study in the US, director Việt Tú continued to produce art shows such as the first live show of singer Tùng Dương Những chuyến đi (Trips). He created and worked as a creative director for Không gian âm nhạc (Music Space, 2011–2012) and Bài hát yêu thích (The Favorite Songs, 2012–2015). Continuing with music event, he directed the live show Mùa Đông Concert (The Winter Concert, 2013), bringing together top names of Vietnam's popular music, as well as Hồ Ngọc Hà Live Concert (2011 and 2014), Vietnam's Night in Moscow (2013-2014) and specially the 3D ballet Swan Lake in August 2015. In 2017, Việt Tú was in charge of Sao đại chiến (Celebrities Battle), which was one of the successful programs of Vietnam Television. In 2018, he continued to contribute in many major events, including the directorial role of the We Choice Awards in Ho Chi Minh City and especially the world-class show Cocofest Music Festival 2018 in Da Nang.

=== Cultural event director ===
Continuous successes had helped Việt Tú to be given a special responsibility of being the general television director for the opening and closing ceremonies of the 2003 Southeast Asian Games held in Vietnam in December 2003. The entire program was made up with 18 cameras and broadcast to hundreds of millions of spectators from all countries in the region.

From 2005, he tried on the field of fashion and became the director of the Đep's Fashion Show This is one of the pioneering shows in contemporary multi-disciplinary art of Vietnam. After that, he directed the script and the theatrical fashion show Cơn ác mộng của người thợ may (Nightmare of a Tailor, 2006). The show also received positive reviews when introducing new forms of stage performances. In addition, the show Bữa tiệc của các tín đồ (Party of Believers, 2007), the first hair fashion show in Vietnam, was structured in a classic play. This was also the basis for him to participate in a number of other fashion shows such as F-Fashion (2011), Lynk Fashion Show (2014 and 2015).

In 2008, Việt Tú was given the task of directing the Opening event of International Day of Vesak in Vietnam. Since 2009, he was the director of many annual Buddhist music series, including Hương sen màu nhiệm, Hương thu ca and Khánh đản. Not only that, he was also the organizer of the Ghost Festival (Lễ Vu Lan) of Tantric Buddhism in London, England.

Việt Tú was also the director of 2010 Miss Vietnam, which was rated by Sports & Culture magazine as one of the most successful programs in the history of this competition. Other cultural events that he has directed include Earth Hour in 2011 & 2018, Nha Trang Beach Festival in 2011, Da Nang Countdown (2012-2017), Hành trình bài ca sinh viên in 2014 and 2015, etc.

Việt Tú is also the first choice of many famous brands in Vietnam. He has been the director of Cuộc đối thoại số 1 (Nokia's Conversation No. 1, 2007), introducing the N-series phones from Nokia Corporation. He was also the director and producer of the launch of the Hermès brand in 2008 and the Piaggio Vespa S in 2010. In addition, Việt Tú was the creative director for Rolls-Royce Motor Cars Vietnam (2013), director and producer of the Vietnam Airlines event to join SkyTeam airline alliance as well as the launch of Viettel’s Halotel network in Tanzania (2015). Recently, he directed the inauguration of Vinhomes Central Park (2016), Vietnam's largest outdoor music festival Honda Vision Steps of Glory (2017) and the Viettel 4G Music Festival (2018).

=== Event organizer ===
With many experiences in organizing and directing music program, in 2011, Việt Tú decided to set up Dream Studio to produce high quality art programs. In addition to the personal show and customer events of many leading artists such as Tùng Dương, Trần Thu Hà, Phương Linh, Mỹ Tâm, Dream Studio is also the company taking over the series Không gian âm nhạc (Music Space) and management of many other names of Vietnamese music, including Phạm Thu Hà. Her debut album, Classic Meets Chillout, produced by Dream Studio was awarded for the "Album of the Year" and also nominated for "New Artist of the Year" in Dedication Music Award 2013.

In 2013, Việt Tú became a theater director, with the establishment of Viet Theatre Company to promote Vietnamese culture to a large number of domestic and global tourists. The first show of Viet Theatre is the Tứ Phủ (Four Palaces), inspired by the Practices related to the Viet Beliefs in Mother Goddesses – an UNESCO’s intangible cultural heritage of humanity. The show received many positive reviews, selected by Hanoi Tourism Department as one of the cultural destinations for domestic and foreign tourists. Not only that, the Tứ Phủ obtained a lot of attention from audiences in Ho Chi Minh City and in other countries.

By the end of 2015, Việt Tú planned to perform Vietnam's first real-landscape performance called Thuở ấy xứ Đoài (Once Upon A Time in Doai Province) in mid-2017 with the participation of 140 farmers on a lake scaled up to 3,000 m^{2}.

== Styles ==
Việt Tú had a difficult start for his directorial career due to his artistic disagreement with his dad because they were both working in the same occupation. He has stated that he considers himself lucky in life. He has been described as meticulous in his work. He has said that what brings value to a director is the success of the art work and an understanding of the market to gain audiences’ satisfaction. He argues that "art should not be limited to the artist in some fixed art fields, as that limits the imagination and the ability to explore the world of these artists".

Thanks to the foundation of a family working in traditional art, Việt Tú always researches and builds his works in Vietnamese and East Asian style. "To attract global tourists is to create works that keep the original culture. For traditional culture to be universal, you need to tell the local story in a global language. National culture is like a Face ID, you use that identity to get to the world. If you do not have the identity, no one will come and see it", Việt Tú shared.

== Legacy ==
Right from the debut, Việt Tú has been identified as one of the leading talents of the entertainment industry in Vietnam. Công an nhân dân News commented, "Việt Tú has the mindset of a person who is capable of controlling “large scale events”, has extensive knowledge of theatrical performance through study and hard work. He is not afraid to experiment with new elements, especially technical ones". In particular, the newspaper praised his dedication to work and putting the interests of the artists and audiences first.

The Tin tức newspaper praised Việt Tú, admitting that his first Đẹp's Fashion Show was "the epitome of the Vietnamese fashion scene", and the Con đường âm nhạc (Music Path) series was “breathing a new life into the entertainment stage of Vietnam at that time, or flamboyant but old-dated, or classic luxury but boring”.

Việt Tú's shows have always received positive reviews. The Tứ Phủ (Four Palaces) is not only selected as a typical cultural event in Hanoi by the Ministry of Sport, Culture and Tourism and UNESCO Vietnam, but also by international audience when performing abroad. At that time, Thuở ấy Xứ Đoài (Once Upon A Time in Doai Province) also impressed audiences in the way of building artistic ideas and staging.

With the first major show Nhật thực (2002), Việt Tú was voted by Tiền Phong newspaper as "Breakthrough Show of the Year". He also owned the title of "Best Video Director of the Year" in two seasons of VTV's Bài hát tôi yêu (2002 and 2003).

Việt Tú is one of the faces of the Dedication Music Award with many nominations, including: 3 times in "Show of the Year" category (Sao Mai điểm hẹn in 2005, Con đường âm nhạc series in 2006, Hồ Ngọc Hà Live Concert in 2012), 1 time in “Album of the Year” category (Classic Meets Chillout, Phạm Thu Hà, 2013) and 2 times in "Series of the Year" category (Giai điệu tự hào in 2015 and Sao đại chiến in 2018). Not only that, he was also one of the artists who owned the "Best Cultural Event of the Year" award with 4 honors (Nhật thực in 2002, 2008 International Day of Vesak, Đẹp's Fashion show and Không gian âm nhạc in 2011).

Việt Tú was two times awarded in Thể thao & Văn hóa magazine and Men Magazine for "Director of the Year" and "Man of the Year" (2005 and 2011). The Tứ Phủ (Four Palaces) show has always been a top choice on artistic performances and listed on the top 3 cultural events highly recommended in Hanoi by TripAdvisor.

== Personal life ==
Việt Tú got married in 2003 with a business woman who is 4-year older than him. They have 2 daughters born in 2004 and 2008. In addition to work, Việt Tú is especially interested in cuisine, fashion, and soccer. As a Buddhist of Tantric, he lives simply and always tries to spend as much time as possible for his family.
