= Vòng Tròn =

Studio album by Hồng Nhung
- Released: November 21, 2011
- Recorded: 2009–2011
- Studio: Dihavina
- Genre: V-pop
- Length: 46:14
- Label: Viết Tân Studio
- Producer: Quốc Trung, Hồng Nhung

Hồng Nhung chronology
Như Cánh Vạc Bay (2006)	Vòng Tròn (2011)	Phố À, Phố Ơi... (2017)

Vòng Tròn, or The Circle, is the eleventh studio album by Vietnamese female singer Hong Nhung, released by Viet Tan Studio on November 21, 2011. The album was written by Hong Nhung, and Quoc Trung wrote the musical script, along with some songs written by other musicians. The songs in the album express a musical message about the close connection between people and the outside world, between music and life.

== Music ==
Quoc Trung is the person who plays the main role in innovating Hong Nhung's style. "Vòng Tròn", the first song in the album and also the first single, is a song that according to Hong Nhung "conveys content about the soul, about life with a profound philosophy". Musician Vo Thien Thanh said that Hong Nhung was the one who proactively invited him to compose an electronic song for this project, and this is the reason "Vòng Tròn" was written.

The song's music video is said to have a "transformation" compared to Hong Nhung's image from previous studio albums, with the content "suggesting a message such as a philosophy of life with the yin and yang circle, the reincarnation of creation, the strong, the weak, the good, the evil". The purpose of this video is to help viewers realize "happiness is living, and the meaning of life lies in the journey between good-evil, red-black, birth-death... like an endless cycle." The video was made in two days with more than 30 hours of work, and is part of a series of videos participating in the 2011 Vietnam Music Video Awards.

The two songs "Phố" and "Saigon" both carry the energy and vitality of the city and metropolis. "Nghịch Nắng" and "Trở Về" refer to Hong Nhung's own nostalgia for Hanoi – a city where the singer was born.

== Live performance ==
Hong Nhung and Quoc Trung introduced Vòng Tròn project at the Bài hát Việt music series on November 13, 2011; Here, she performed live four songs "Papa", "Nghịch Nắng", "Saigon" and the title track "Vòng Tròn". "Papa" was also performed by Hong Nhung as a duet with Vietnamese singer Vu Cat Tuong at the music concert Phố À Phố Ơi... Bống À Bống Ơi! on December 5, 2015, in Hanoi.

== Reception ==
Some viewers believe that Hong Nhung's image in the album is somewhat younger than her age, and that the fashion style or hairstyle she shows is only suitable for teenagers. The album was nominated for the 2011 Dedication Music Award for Album of the Year. The song "Vòng Tròn" also received the Favorite Song of August 2012 award.

== Track listing ==
Vòng Tròn track listing
No.	Title	Writer(s)	Length
1.	"Vòng Tròn"	Võ Thiện Thanh	4:08
2.	"Nghịch Nắng"	Lưu Hà An	4:24
3.	"Danh Vọng"	Huy Tuấn, Hồng Nhung	4:21
4.	"Papa"	Dương Khắc Linh, Thanh Bùi, Hồng Nhung	3:53
5.	"Anh Đừng Đi"	Mai Thắng, Hồng Nhung	4:16
6.	"Phố"	Quốc Trung	5:21
7.	"Trở Về"	Lưu Hà An	4:02
8.	"Ngao Du"	Huy Tuấn, Hồng Nhung	4:29
9.	"Saigon"	Huy Tuấn, Hồng Nhung	3:39
10.	"Giấc Mơ Ngày Bé"	Dương Khắc Linh, Thanh Bùi, Hồng Nhung	4:29
11.	"Bống Bống Bang Bang"	Nguyễn Đức Cường	3:12
Total length:			46:14

Vòng Tròn DVD
No.	Title	Length
1.	"Papa"
2.	"Vòng Tròn"
3.	"Behind the Scenes"
