= The Voice of Vietnam season 2 =

The Voice of Vietnam
- Season 2
- Hosted by: Phan Anh; Yumi Dương (media backstage correspondent)
- Judges: Mỹ Linh; Đàm Vĩnh Hưng; Hồng Nhung; Quốc Trung
- Winner: Vũ Thảo My
- Winning coach: Đàm Vĩnh Hưng
- Runner-up: Nguyễn Hoàng Tôn

Release
- Original network: VTV3
- Original release: May 19 – December 15, 2013

Season chronology
- ← Previous; Season 1 Next → Season 3

The second season of The Voice of Vietnam began on May 19, 2013 and ended on December 15, 2013 on VTV3. The casting process and preliminary audition took place right after the finale of the previous season. Đàm Vĩnh Hưng and Phan Anh returned as coach and host respectively. Mỹ Linh, Hồng Nhung and Quốc Trung replaced Thu Minh, Trần Lập, Hồ Ngọc Hà as coaches.

This season was won by Vũ Thảo My from team Đàm Vĩnh Hưng.

== Teams ==
Color Key

- Winner
- Runner-up
- Third place
- Fourth place
- Eliminated at the Liveshows
- Sloten by another coach at the Battles
- Eliminated at the Knockouts
- Eliminated at the Battles

| Coach | Top 64 artists | | | | |
|---|---|---|---|---|---|
| Mỹ Linh | | | | | |
| Mỹ Linh | Nguyễn Hoàng Tôn | Nguyễn Thái Quang | Dương Hoàng Yến | Trần Thị Diễm Hương | Trần Huyền My |
| Mỹ Linh | Nguyễn Thị Ý Nhi | Phạm Thị Thanh Trúc | Nguyễn Phan Tuấn | Nguyễn Nhật Thu | Đỗ Hoàng Viễn Dương |
| Mỹ Linh | Nguyễn Văn Tây | Nguyễn Hồng Nhung | Trần Hoàng | Trần Thụy Bình Quyên | Lê Thùy An |
| Mỹ Linh | Lê Đức Hùng | Nguyễn Đình Nhân | Ngô Huỳnh Trúc Vy | | |
| Đàm Vĩnh Hưng | | | | | |
| Đàm Vĩnh Hưng | Vũ Thảo My | Nguyễn Song Tú | Nguyễn Ngọc Trâm | Nguyễn Trần Minh Sang | Nguyễn Văn Viết |
| Đàm Vĩnh Hưng | Nguyễn Sơn Hải | Nguyễn Đức Thuận | Nguyễn Quân | Trần Thị Hồng Gấm | Phạm Quốc Huy |
| Đàm Vĩnh Hưng | ~~Vũ Cát Tường~~ | ~~Phạm Hà Linh~~ | ~~Trần Thị Diễm Hương~~ | Hoàng Thiên Minh Trị | Nguyễn Trà My |
| Đàm Vĩnh Hưng | Đinh Quốc Anh Huy | Đặng Đăng Thanh | Nguyễn Bá Phú Quý | | |
| Hồng Nhung | | | | | |
| Hồng Nhung | Vũ Cát Tường | Phạm Hà Linh | Âu Bảo Ngân | Đỗ Thành Nam | Hoàng Nhật Minh |
| Hồng Nhung | Trương Thảo Nhi | Lưu Thanh Thanh | Trần Thị Hoàng Oanh | Nguyễn Xuân Lân | Nguyễn Thị Khánh Ly |
| Hồng Nhung | ~~Phạm Khánh Duy~~ | ~~Phạm Thị Thanh Trúc~~ | ~~Đinh Thị My Hoàn~~ | Y Kroc | Đoàn Mạnh Thắng |
| Hồng Nhung | Hồ Khánh Hà | Nguyễn Đức Tùng | Trần Cao Cẩm Tú | | |
| Quốc Trung | | | | | |
| Quốc Trung | Trần Vũ Hà My | Trần Thái Châu | Đinh Thị My Hoàn | Phạm Khánh Duy | Nguyễn Lâm Hoàng Phúc |
| Quốc Trung | Lý Minh Trí | Nông Tiến Bắc | Lê Nguyệt Anh | Nguyễn Dương Nhật Quang | Trần Đào Anh Vũ |
| Quốc Trung | ~~Nguyễn Văn Viết~~ | ~~Nguyễn Quân~~ | Lê Gia Bảo | Huỳnh Nữ Thủy Tiên | Trương Ngọc Dung |
| Quốc Trung | Thân Trọng Nghĩa | Trần Tuấn | Phạm Thị Ngọc Lan | | |

== The Blind Auditions ==
=== Episode 1: Blind Auditions, Week 1 ===
The first episode of the show aired on May 19, 2013.

| Coach hit his/her 'TÔI CHỌN BẠN' button | Contestant eliminated with no coach pressing his/her 'TÔI CHỌN BẠN' button | Contestant defaulted to this coach's team | Contestant elected to join this coach's team |

| Order | Contestant | Song | Coaches' and Contestants' Choices | | | |
| Order | Contestant | Song | Quốc Trung | Hồng Nhung | Đàm Vĩnh Hưng | Mỹ Linh |
|---|---|---|---|---|---|---|
| 1 | Phạm Khánh Duy 27, Ho Chi Minh City | "When You Say You Love Me" | | | | — |
| 2 | Nguyễn Trần Minh Sang 29, Ho Chi Minh City | "Nơi tình yêu bắt đầu" | | — | | — |
| 3 | Lê Gia Bảo 22, Thừa Thiên–Huế | "Saving all my love for you" | | — | | — |
| 4 | Nguyễn Văn Viết 27, Hanoi | "Gánh hàng rau" | | | — | |
| 5 | Võ Ngọc Khánh 20, Da Nang | "Listen" | — | — | — | — |
| 6 | Thân Trọng Nghĩa 26, Ho Chi Minh City | "Here Without You" | | | | |
| 7 | Trần Thụy Bình Quyên 20, Ho Chi Minh City | "I Cried For You" | — | — | — | |
| 8 | Phạm Hà Linh 26, Hanoi | "Em vẫn muốn yêu anh" | — | | | — |
| 9 | Đoàn Mạnh Thắng 26, Hanoi | "My love" | | | — | — |
| 10 | Âu Bảo Ngân 24, Sóc Trăng | "I Could Have Danced All Night" | — | | — | |
| 11 | Trương Thảo Nhi 20, Ho Chi Minh City | "Cặp ba lá" | — | | — | |
| 12 | Vũ Thảo My 16, từ Nam Định | "You and I" | | | | |

=== Episode 2: Blind Auditions, Week 2 ===
The second Blind Audition taped episode was broadcast on May 26, 2013.

| Order | Contestant | Song | Coaches' and Contestants' Choices | | | |
| Order | Contestant | Song | Quốc Trung | Hồng Nhung | Đàm Vĩnh Hưng | Mỹ Linh |
|---|---|---|---|---|---|---|
| 1 | Trần Huyền My 17, Ha Noi | "Hero" | — | — | — | |
| 2 | Nguyễn Đình Nhân 20, Da Nang | "Mắt đen" | — | | — | |
| 3 | Trần Hoàng 25, Quảng Trị | "Chỉ còn riêng anh" | | — | — | |
| 4 | Nguyễn Quân 24, Tp. Hồ Chí Minh | "One more night" | | | | |
| 5 | Nguyễn Thị Ngọc Ngà 19, Hải Dương | "Hạ trắng" | — | — | — | — |
| 6 | không rõ ?, unknown | "Home" | — | — | — | — |
| 7 | không rõ ?, unknown | "Bay" | — | — | — | — |
| 8 | không rõ ?, unknown | "Biển nhớ" | — | — | — | — |
| 9 | Hoàng Thiên Minh Trị 26, Ho Chi Minh City | "Love the Way You Lie" | — | — | | — |
| 10 | Trần Vũ Hà My 28, Ho Chi Minh City | "Hoang dại (Stress)" | | — | | |
| 11 | Hoàng Nhật Minh 29, Thanh Hóa | "Hãy quay về khi còn yêu nhau" | — | | | |
| 12 | Lê Đức Hùng 23, Ho Chi Minh City | "Do It like a Dude" | — | — | — | |
| 13 | Nguyễn Phan Tuấn 20, unknown | "Lắng Nghe Mùa Xuân Về" | – | – | – | |
| 14 | Nguyễn Bá Phú Quý 26, unknown | "Forever and One" | — | — | | — |
| 15 | Phạm Thị Ngọc Lan ?, unknown | "(?)" | | unknown | unknown | unknown |
| 16 | Nguyễn Trà My 21, Nghệ An | "Nỗi đau ngự trị" | | | | — |
| 17 | Nguyễn Thị Khánh Ly 17, Da Nang | "I will always love you" | — | | | |
| 18 | Nguyễn Hoàng Tôn 24, Ho Chi Minh City | "Em không quay về" | | | | |

=== Episode 3: Blind Auditions, Week 3 ===
The third Blind Audition taped episode was broadcast on June 9, 2013

| Order | Contestant | Song | Coaches' and Contestants' Choices | | | |
| Order | Contestant | Song | Quốc Trung | Hồng Nhung | Đàm Vĩnh Hưng | Mỹ Linh |
|---|---|---|---|---|---|---|
| 1 | Đặng Đăng Thanh 23, Gia Lai | "Góc tối" | — | — | | — |
| 2 | Lý Minh Trí 27, Ho Chi Minh City | "Ain't No Sunshine" | | — | — | — |
| 3 | Đinh Quốc Anh Huy 21, Ho Chi Minh City | "Cỏ và mưa" | | — | | — |
| 4 | Đỗ Thành Nam 22, Ha Noi | "Lặng thầm một tình yêu" | — | | | — |
| 5 | Y Krốc 28, Đắk Nông | "Hallelujah" | | | — | — |
| 6 | Nguyễn Văn Tây 23, Da Nang | "I Won't Let Go" | — | | — | |
| 7 | Nguyễn Thị Ý Nhi 19, Gia Lai | "Nuối tiếc" | — | | — | |
| 8 | Hồ Thị Khánh Hà 24, Thừa Thiên–Huế | "Torn" | | | — | |
| 9 | Trần Thị Diễm Hương 19, Ho Chi Minh City | "What's Up?" | | — | | |
| 10 | Trần Thị Hoàng Oanh 25, Ho Chi Minh City | "Zombie" | | | | |
| 11 | Vũ Cát Tường 21, An Giang | "Đông" | | | | |

=== Episode 4: Blind Auditions, Week 4 ===
The fourth Blind Audition taped episode was broadcast on June 16, 2013

| Order | Contestant | Song | Coaches' and Contestants' Choices | | | |
| Order | Contestant | Song | Quốc Trung | Hồng Nhung | Đàm Vĩnh Hưng | Mỹ Linh |
|---|---|---|---|---|---|---|
| 1 | Đỗ Hoàng Viễn Dương ?, unknown | "Moondance" | | — | — | |
| 2 | Lê Nguyệt Anh 23, Ha Noi | "Amazing Grace" | | — | — | |
| 3 | Nguyễn Thái Quang ?, Thái Nguyên | "Mất trí" | — | — | — | |
| 4 | Chen Yen Zhen 19, Ho Chi Minh City | "Impossible" | — | — | — | — |
| 5 | Phạm Quốc Huy 23, Ha Noi | "Xin lỗi" | — | — | | — |
| 6 | Nguyễn Lâm Hoàng Phúc 20, Ho Chi Minh City | "Skyfall" | | — | — | — |
| 7 | Trần Thị Hồng Gấm 20, Bình Định | "Một cõi đi về" | — | — | | — |
| 8 | Lê Thùy An 25, từ Hà Nội | "Promise me" | | | — | |
| 9 | Nguyễn Dương Nhật Quang 29, Ho Chi Minh City | "For the First Time" | | | | |
| 10 | Nông Tiến Bắc 26, Ha Noi | "Hero" | | | — | — |
| 11 | Nguyễn Xuân Lân 24, Ho Chi Minh City | "Use Somebody" | | | | |

=== Episode 5: Blind Auditions, Week 5 ===
The final Blind Audition taped episode was broadcast on June 23, 2013

| Order | Contestant | Song | Coaches' and Contestants' Choices | | | |
| Order | Contestant | Song | Quốc Trung | Hồng Nhung | Đàm Vĩnh Hưng | Mỹ Linh |
|---|---|---|---|---|---|---|
| 1 | Phạm Thanh Trúc 21, Ho Chi Minh City | "Bài ca trên đồi" | — | | | — |
| 2 | Nguyễn Hồng Nhung 19, Ha Noi | "Once upon a dream" | — | | — | |
| 3 | Trần Cao Cẩm Tú 20, Ho Chi Minh City | "Don't Know Why" | | | — | |
| 4 | Trần Đào Anh Vũ 24, Ho Chi Minh City | "If I Ain't Got You" | | | — | — |
| 5 | Nguyễn Song Tú 31, Ho Chi Minh City | "Nothing Compares To You" | | | | — |
| 6 | Nguyễn Ngọc Trâm 17, Nghệ An | "Anh" | — | | | |
| 7 | Nguyễn Trung Hiếu 30, Ha Noi | "Sometimes When We Touch" | — | — | — | — |
| 8 | Ngô Huỳnh Trúc Vy 25, Kon Tum | "Diễm xưa" | — | | — | |
| 9 | Dương Hoàng Yến 21, Ha Noi | "Adagio" | | | | |
| 10 | Trương Ngọc Dung 30, Ho Chi Minh City | "If I Were a Boy" | | — | — | — |
| 11 | Nguyễn Sơn Hải 22, Thái Nguyên | "Chưa bao giờ" | — | — | | — |

== Battle Rounds ==
The Battle aired from June 30 to August 11, 2013. The "steal" was first introduced this season. Each coach had two steals throughout the Battles. Contestants who won their battles or stolen by another coach advanced to the Knockouts.

The advisers for each team In the Battles were: musician Hồng Kiên for team Mỹ Linh, singer Nguyễn Ngọc Anh for team Đàm Vĩnh Hưng, The Voice Kids coach Thanh Bùi for team Hồng Nhung and music producer Lưu Thiên Hương for team Quốc Trung.

Color key:

| Artist won the Battle and advances to the Knockouts |
| Artist lost the Battle but was stolen by another coach and advances to the Knockouts |
| Artist lost the Battle and was eliminated |

| Episode | Coach | Order | Winner | Song | Loser | 'Steal' result | | | |
| Episode | Coach | Order | Winner | Song | Loser | Mỹ Linh | Đàm Vĩnh Hưng | Hồng Nhung | Quốc Trung |
|---|---|---|---|---|---|---|---|---|---|
| Episode 6 (Sunday, June 30, 2013) | Đàm Vĩnh Hưng | 1 | Nguyễn Đức Thuận | "Chàng Hát Rong" | Đặng Đăng Thanh | — | —N/a | — | — |
| Episode 6 (Sunday, June 30, 2013) | Hồng Nhung | 2 | Trương Thảo Nhi | "Chạy Mưa" | Đinh Thị My Hoàn | — | — | —N/a | ✔ |
| Episode 6 (Sunday, June 30, 2013) | Đàm Vĩnh Hưng | 3 | Nguyễn Trần Minh Sang | "Anh Sẽ Nhớ Mãi" | Đinh Quốc Anh Huy | — | —N/a | — | — |
| Episode 6 (Sunday, June 30, 2013) | Mỹ Linh | 4 | Đỗ Hoàng Viễn Dương | "When I Said I Do" | Ngô Huỳnh Trúc Vy | —N/a | — | — | — |
| Episode 6 (Sunday, June 30, 2013) | Quốc Trung | 5 | Nguyễn Dương Nhật Quang | "Just the Way You Are" | Nguyễn Quân | ✔ | ✔ | — | —N/a |
| Episode 7 (Sunday, July 14, 2013) | Quốc Trung | 1 | Trần Đào Anh Vũ | "Làm Ơn" | Phạm Thị Ngọc Lan | — | — | — | —N/a |
| Episode 7 (Sunday, July 14, 2013) | Mỹ Linh | 2 | Nguyễn Nhật Thu | "Đêm Tình Nhân" | Nguyễn Đình Nhân | —N/a | — | — | — |
| Episode 7 (Sunday, July 14, 2013) | Hồng Nhung | 3 | Lưu Thanh Thanh | "As Long as You Love Me"/"What Goes Around... Comes Around" | Đoàn Mạnh Thắng | — | — | —N/a | — |
| Episode 7 (Sunday, July 14, 2013) | Mỹ Linh | 4 | Dương Hoàng Yến | "Gọi Anh" | Trần Hoàng | —N/a | — | — | — |
| Episode 7 (Sunday, July 14, 2013) | Đàm Vĩnh Hưng | 5 | Nguyễn Sơn Hải | "Endless Love" | Phạm Hà Linh | ✔ | —N/a | ✔ | ✔ |
| Episode 8 (Sunday, July 21, 2013) | Quốc Trung | 1 | Trần Vũ Hà My | "Đường Cong" | Phạm Gia Bảo | — | — | — | —N/a |
| Episode 8 (Sunday, July 21, 2013) | Đàm Vĩnh Hưng | 2 | Trần Thị Hồng Gấm | "To Love You More" | Trần Thị Diễm Hương | ✔ | —N/a | ✔ | — |
| Episode 8 (Sunday, July 21, 2013) | Hồng Nhung | 3 | Nguyễn Xuân Lân | "Grenade" | Nguyễn Đức Tùng | — | — | —N/a | — |
| Episode 8 (Sunday, July 21, 2013) | Mỹ Linh | 4 | Nguyễn Thị Ý Nhi | "Cơn Gió Lạ" | Lê Thùy An | —N/a | — | — | — |
| Episode 8 (Sunday, July 21, 2013) | Đàm Vĩnh Hưng | 5 | Nguyễn Song Tú | "One Night Only" | Vũ Cát Tường | ✔ | —N/a | ✔ | ✔ |
| Episode 9 (Sunday, July 28, 2013) | Quốc Trung | 1 | Lý Minh Trí | "Biết Rằng" | Trương Ngọc Dung | — | — | Team full | —N/a |
| Episode 9 (Sunday, July 28, 2013) | Mỹ Linh | 2 | Trần Huyền My | "Put Your Records On" | Trần Thụy Bình Quyên | —N/a | — | Team full | — |
| Episode 9 (Sunday, July 28, 2013) | Quốc Trung | 3 | Trần Thái Châu | "Feeling Good" | Nguyễn Văn Viết | ✔ | ✔ | Team full | —N/a |
| Episode 9 (Sunday, July 28, 2013) | Mỹ Linh | 4 | Nguyễn Phan Tuấn | "Em Sẽ Là Giấc Mơ" | Lê Đức Hùng | —N/a | Team full | Team full | — |
| Episode 9 (Sunday, July 28, 2013) | Quốc Trung | 5 | Nguyễn Lâm Hoàng Phúc | "You Know I'm No Good" | Huỳnh Nữ Thủy Tiên | — | Team full | Team full | —N/a |
| Episode 9 (Sunday, July 28, 2013) | Đàm Vĩnh Hưng | 6 | Phạm Quốc Huy | "Yêu Mình Anh" | Nguyễn Bá Phú Quý | — | Team full | Team full | — |
| Episode 9 (Sunday, July 28, 2013) | Hồng Nhung | 7 | Hoàng Nhật Minh | "Dư Âm" | Phạm Thị Thanh Trúc | ✔ | Team full | Team full | — |
| Episode 9 (Sunday, July 28, 2013) | Mỹ Linh | 8 | Nguyễn Hoàng Tôn | "Tình Về Nơi Đâu" | Nguyễn Văn Tây | —N/a | Team full | Team full | — |
| Episode 10 (Sunday, August 11, 2013) | Mỹ Linh | 1 | Nguyễn Thái Quang | "There You'll Be" | Nguyễn Hồng Nhung | Team full | Team full | Team full | — |
| Episode 10 (Sunday, August 11, 2013) | Quốc Trung | 2 | Lê Nguyệt Anh | "Biển Và Ánh Trăng" | Trần Tuấn | Team full | Team full | Team full | —N/a |
| Episode 10 (Sunday, August 11, 2013) | Đàm Vĩnh Hưng | 3 | Vũ Thảo My | "Dệt Tầm Gai" | Hoàng Thiên Minh Trị | Team full | Team full | Team full | — |
| Episode 10 (Sunday, August 11, 2013) | Hồng Nhung | 4 | Trần Thị Hoàng Oanh | "Girl On Fire" | Hồ Khánh Hà | Team full | Team full | Team full | — |
| Episode 10 (Sunday, August 11, 2013) | Quốc Trung | 5 | Nông Tiến Bắc | "Linh Hồn Và Thể Xác" | Thân Trọng Nghĩa | Team full | Team full | Team full | —N/a |
| Episode 10 (Sunday, August 11, 2013) | Hồng Nhung | 6 | Đỗ Thành Nam | "Nhìn Lại" | Y Kroc | Team full | Team full | Team full | — |
| Episode 10 (Sunday, August 11, 2013) | Đàm Vĩnh Hưng | 7 | Nguyễn Ngọc Trâm | "Và Em Có Anh" | Nguyễn Trà My | Team full | Team full | Team full | — |
| Episode 10 (Sunday, August 11, 2013) | Hồng Nhung | 8 | Âu Bảo Ngân | "The Prayer" | Phạm Khánh Duy | Team full | Team full | Team full | ✔ |

== The Knockouts ==
The Knockout was introduced this season. In this round, two artists from a team were selected into a battle, in which each of them performed a solo song and one would be declared the winner and advanced to the Live shows. The Knockout Rounds aired from August 18 to September 8, 2013.

Color key:

| Artist won the Knockouts and advances to the Live shows |
| Artist lost the Knockouts and was eliminated |

| Episode | Coach | Order | Song | Artists | | Song |
| Episode | Coach | Order | Song | Winner | Loser | Song |
|---|---|---|---|---|---|---|
| Episode 11 (Sunday, August 18, 2013) | Mỹ Linh | 1 | "Tìm Lại Giấc Mơ" | Nguyễn Thái Quang | Phạm Thị Thanh Trúc | "Cô Đơn Mình Em" |
| Episode 11 (Sunday, August 18, 2013) | Quốc Trung | 2 | "Nơi Ấy" | Nguyễn Lâm Hoàng Phúc | Trần Đào Anh Vũ | "Lời Yêu Xa" |
| Episode 11 (Sunday, August 18, 2013) | Hồng Nhung | 3 | "Giọt Sương Trên Mí Mắt" | Hoàng Nhật Minh | Nguyễn Thị Khánh Ly | "Cây Vĩ Cầm" |
| Episode 11 (Sunday, August 18, 2013) | Đàm Vĩnh Hưng | 4 | "Thư Pháp" | Nguyễn Trần Minh Sang | Trần Thị Hồng Gấm | "Dạ Khúc Cho Tình Nhân" |
| Episode 11 (Sunday, August 18, 2013) | Quốc Trung | 5 | "Tình Cho Muộn Phiền" | Trần Vũ Hà My | Lý Minh Trí | "Tôi Đọc Báo Công Cộng" |
| Episode 11 (Sunday, August 18, 2013) | Mỹ Linh | 6 | "Căn Gác Trống" | Nguyễn Hoàng Tôn | Nguyễn Thị Ý Nhi | "Sẽ Thôi Mong Chờ" |
| Episode 12 (Sunday, August 25, 2013) | Quốc Trung | 7 | "Vỏ Bọc" | Đinh Thị My Hoàn | Lê Nguyệt Anh | "Rơi" |
| Episode 12 (Sunday, August 25, 2013) | Hồng Nhung | 8 | "Chỉ Là Giấc Mơ" | Đỗ Thành Nam | Nguyễn Xuân Lân | "Độc Bước" |
| Episode 12 (Sunday, August 25, 2013) | Mỹ Linh | 9 | "Tìm Lại" | Trần Thị Diễm Hương | Nguyễn Nhật Thu | "I Don't Want to Miss a Thing" |
| Episode 12 (Sunday, August 25, 2013) | Mỹ Linh | 10 | "Mượn" | Trần Huyền My | Đỗ Hoàng Viễn Dương | "Tan Vào Mưa" |
| Episode 12 (Sunday, August 25, 2013) | Đàm Vĩnh Hưng | 11 | "I Have Nothing" | Vũ Thảo My | Nguyễn Sơn Hải | "Một Mình" |
| Episode 12 (Sunday, August 25, 2013) | Đàm Vĩnh Hưng | 12 | "Dấu Chân Tìm Về" | Nguyễn Văn Viết | Phạm Quốc Huy | "You Raise Me Up" |
| Episode 12 (Sunday, August 25, 2013) | Quốc Trung | 13 | "Hi Vọng" | Phạm Khánh Duy | Nguyễn Dương Nhật Quang | "Sài Gòn Cà Phê Sữa Đá" |
| Episode 12 (Sunday, August 25, 2013) | Hồng Nhung | 14 | "Cảm Ơn Tình Yêu Tôi" | Vũ Cát Tường | Trương Thảo Nhi | "Uống Trà" |
| Episode 13 (Sunday, September 8, 2013) | Quốc Trung | 15 | "Nhắm Mắt " | Trần Thái Châu | Nông Tiến Bắc | "The Reason" |
| Episode 13 (Sunday, September 8, 2013) | Đàm Vĩnh Hưng | 16 | "Khúc Hát Phiêu Ly" | Nguyễn Song Tú | Nguyễn Đức Thuận | "Take Me To The Pilot" |
| Episode 13 (Sunday, September 8, 2013) | Mỹ Linh | 17 | "Yêu" | Dương Hoàng Yến | Nguyễn Phan Tuấn | "Chỉ Còn Lại Tình Yêu" |
| Episode 13 (Sunday, September 8, 2013) | Hồng Nhung | 18 | "Somewhere Over The Rainbow" | Âu Bảo Ngân | Trần Thị Hoàng Oanh | "Read All About It" |
| Episode 13 (Sunday, September 8, 2013) | Đàm Vĩnh Hưng | 19 | "Xa" | Nguyễn Ngọc Trâm | Nguyễn Quân | "Lạc Lối" |
| Episode 13 (Sunday, September 8, 2013) | Hồng Nhung | 20 | "Đêm Nằm Mơ Phố" | Phạm Hà Linh | Lưu Thanh Thanh | "Mercy" |

== Live shows ==
This season nine live shows were produced.

Color key

| Artist was saved by the public's vote |
| Artist was part of the bottom two or three in his/her team and had to sing-off |
| Artist was saved by his/her coach |
| Artist was eliminated |

=== Episodes 14–16: Round 1 (Top 20) ===
The top 20 performed on the first two live shows, with the result announced on the third night. Within each team, the two top vote-getter was automatically sent through to the next round, each coach then saved one from elimination and the two remaining contestants faced each other in the sing-off.

- Group performance: The Voice of Vietnam 2 coaches (Medley of "Hò Kéo Pháo" & "Chiến Thắng Điện Biên"), Leanne Mitchell and the top 20 ("Yoü and I")
- Musical guests: Vũ Thanh Hằng ("Một"), Đinh Hương ("So I"), Leanne Mitchell & Hương Tràm ("Run to You"), Leanne Mitchell ("It's a Man's Man's Man's World").

| Episode | Coach | Order | Artist | Song | Result |
|---|---|---|---|---|---|
| Episode 14 (September 15) | Đàm Vĩnh Hưng | 1 | Nguyễn Văn Viết | "Đường Xa Tuyết Trắng" | Sing-off |
| Episode 14 (September 15) | Mỹ Linh | 2 | Trần Thị Diễm Hương | "Ngày Hôm Nay" | Sing-off |
| Episode 14 (September 15) | Đàm Vĩnh Hưng | 3 | Nguyễn Trần Minh Sang | "Cho Tôi Ước Mơ" | Sing-off |
| Episode 14 (September 15) | Mỹ Linh | 4 | Trần Huyền My | "Người Em Yêu Mãi" | Sing-off |
| Episode 14 (September 15) | Đàm Vĩnh Hưng | 5 | Vũ Thảo My | "Ngày Mưa Rơi" | Đàm Vĩnh Hưng's choice |
| Episode 14 (September 15) | Mỹ Linh | 6 | Nguyễn Thái Quang | "Lạc" | Mỹ Linh's choice |
| Episode 14 (September 15) | Đàm Vĩnh Hưng | 7 | Nguyễn Ngọc Trâm | "You Bring Me Down" | Public's vote |
| Episode 14 (September 15) | Mỹ Linh | 8 | Nguyễn Hoàng Tôn | "Để Em Rời Xa" | Public's vote |
| Episode 14 (September 15) | Đàm Vĩnh Hưng | 9 | Nguyễn Song Tú | "Try" | Public's vote |
| Episode 14 (September 15) | Mỹ Linh | 10 | Dương Hoàng Yến | "Hurt" | Public's vote |
| Episode 15 (September 29) | Quốc Trung | 1 | Đinh Thị My Hoàn | "Nhịp Đập Giấc Mơ" | Sing-off |
| Episode 15 (September 29) | Hồng Nhung | 2 | Đỗ Thành Nam | "Ngẫu Hứng Sông Hồng" | Sing-off |
| Episode 15 (September 29) | Quốc Trung | 3 | Nguyễn Lâm Hoàng Phúc | "Ai Về Sông Tương" | Sing-off |
| Episode 15 (September 29) | Hồng Nhung | 4 | Hoàng Nhật Minh | "Em Hãy Ngủ Đi" | Sing-off |
| Episode 15 (September 29) | Quốc Trung | 5 | Trần Vũ Hà My | "Just Give Me a Reason" | Public's vote |
| Episode 15 (September 29) | Hồng Nhung | 6 | Âu Bảo Ngân | "Cô Gái Vót Chông" | Hồng Nhung's choice |
| Episode 15 (September 29) | Quốc Trung | 7 | Phạm Khánh Duy | "Fix You" | Public's vote |
| Episode 15 (September 29) | Hồng Nhung | 8 | Phạm Hà Linh | "Người Ơi Người Ở Đừng Về" | Public's vote |
| Episode 15 (September 29) | Quốc Trung | 9 | Trần Thái Châu | "Trời Cho" | Quốc Trung's choice |
| Episode 15 (September 29) | Hồng Nhung | 10 | Vũ Cát Tường | "Run the World (Girls)"/"Billie Jean" | Public's vote |
Sing-off Performances
| Episode 16 (October 13) | Mỹ Linh | 1 | Trần Huyền My | "Giấc Mơ Mang Tên Mình" | Eliminated |
| Episode 16 (October 13) | Mỹ Linh | 2 | Trần Thị Diễm Hương | "Still Loving You" | Mỹ Linh's choice |
| Episode 16 (October 13) | Đàm Vĩnh Hưng | 3 | Nguyễn Văn Viết | "Đổi Thay" | Eliminated |
| Episode 16 (October 13) | Đàm Vĩnh Hưng | 4 | Nguyễn Trần Minh Sang | "Chạy Tìm Lá Non" | Đàm Vĩnh Hưng's choice |
| Episode 16 (October 13) | Hồng Nhung | 5 | Hoàng Nhật Minh | "Cô Gái Đến Từ Hôm Qua" | Eliminated |
| Episode 16 (October 13) | Hồng Nhung | 6 | Đỗ Thành Nam | "Where Did We Go Wrong" | Hồng Nhung's choice |
| Episode 16 (October 13) | Quốc Trung | 7 | Đinh Thị My Hoàn | "Chỉ Là Giấc Mơ" | Quốc Trung's choice |
| Episode 16 (October 13) | Quốc Trung | 8 | Nguyễn Lâm Hoàng Phúc | "Make You Feel My Love" | Eliminated |

=== Episodes 17–18: Round 2 (Top 16) ===
All 16 remaining artists performed on liveshow 4 and the results were announced at liveshow 5.

- Musical guests: Đỗ Xuân Sơn & Nguyễn Trọng Khương ("Un-Break My Heart")

| Episode | Coach | Order | Artist | Song | Result |
|---|---|---|---|---|---|
| Episode 17 (October 27) | Hồng Nhung | 1 | Âu Bảo Ngân | "In the End" | Sing-off |
| Episode 17 (October 27) | Mỹ Linh | 2 | Nguyễn Thái Quang | "Brave" | Sing-off |
| Episode 17 (October 27) | Quốc Trung | 3 | Đinh Thị My Hoàn | "Mùa Đông Đã Qua" | Public's vote |
| Episode 17 (October 27) | Đàm Vĩnh Hưng | 4 | Vũ Thảo My | "(You Make Me Feel Like) A Natural Woman" | Public's vote |
| Episode 17 (October 27) | Đàm Vĩnh Hưng | 5 | Nguyễn Ngọc Trâm | "Hồ Trên Núi" | Đàm Vĩnh Hưng's choice |
| Episode 17 (October 27) | Mỹ Linh | 6 | Trần Thị Diễm Hương | "Trăng Khuyết" | Sing-off |
| Episode 17 (October 27) | Quốc Trung | 7 | Phạm Khánh Duy | "Thu Cạn" | Sing-off |
| Episode 17 (October 27) | Hồng Nhung | 8 | Đỗ Thành Nam | "Đường Về Xa Xôi" | Sing-off |
| Episode 17 (October 27) | Hồng Nhung | 9 | Vũ Cát Tường | "Bài Hát Ru Mùa Đông" | Hồng Nhung's choice |
| Episode 17 (October 27) | Mỹ Linh | 10 | Dương Hoàng Yến | "Mẹ Yêu Con" | Mỹ Linh's choice |
| Episode 17 (October 27) | Quốc Trung | 11 | Trần Thái Châu | "Em Về Giữa Mênh Mông Đất Trời" | Sing-off |
| Episode 17 (October 27) | Đàm Vĩnh Hưng | 12 | Nguyễn Trần Minh Sang | "The Phantom of the Opera" | Sing-off |
| Episode 17 (October 27) | Hồng Nhung | 13 | Phạm Hà Linh | "Broken Vow" | Public's vote |
| Episode 17 (October 27) | Quốc Trung | 14 | Trần Vũ Hà My | "Tiếng Đêm" | Quốc Trung's choice |
| Episode 17 (October 27) | Mỹ Linh | 15 | Nguyễn Hoàng Tôn | "Treasure" | Public's vote |
| Episode 17 (October 27) | Đàm Vĩnh Hưng | 16 | Nguyễn Song Tú | "Ngọn Lửa Cao Nguyên" | Sing-off |
Sing-off Performances
| Episode 18 (November 10) | Mỹ Linh | 1 | Nguyễn Thái Quang | "Con Cò" | Mỹ Linh's choice |
| Episode 18 (November 10) | Mỹ Linh | 2 | Trần Thị Diễm Hương | "Giấc Mơ Mang Tên Mình" | Eliminated |
| Episode 18 (November 10) | Đàm Vĩnh Hưng | 3 | Nguyễn Trần Minh Sang | "Fleurs du Mal" | Eliminated |
| Episode 18 (November 10) | Đàm Vĩnh Hưng | 4 | Nguyễn Song Tú | "Perfect" | Đàm Vĩnh Hưng's choice |
| Episode 18 (November 10) | Hồng Nhung | 5 | Âu Bảo Ngân | "Mẹ Tôi" | Hồng Nhung's choice |
| Episode 18 (November 10) | Hồng Nhung | 6 | Đỗ Thành Nam | "Vẽ" | Eliminated |
| Episode 18 (November 10) | Quốc Trung | 7 | Phạm Khánh Duy | "Dấu Mưa" | Eliminated |
| Episode 18 (November 10) | Quốc Trung | 8 | Trần Thái Châu | "Điên" | Quốc Trung's choice |

=== Episodes 19: Quarterfinals (Top 12) ===
The Top 12 performed on liveshow 6, with the result announced at the end of the show.

- Group performance: Top 12 (Medley of "Mong ước kỉ niệm xưa"/"Ngày đầu tiên đi học"/"Bụi phấn"/"Bông hồng tặng cô")
- Musical guests: Bee.T ("Trên Đỉnh Phù Vân")

| Episode | Coach | Order | Artist | Song | Result |
|---|---|---|---|---|---|
| Episode 19 (November 17) | Quốc Trung | 1 | Trần Thái Châu | "Totem Sói" | Quốc Trung's choice |
| Episode 19 (November 17) | Hồng Nhung | 2 | Âu Bảo Ngân | "Bác Làm Vườn Và Con Chim Sâu" | Eliminated |
| Episode 19 (November 17) | Mỹ Linh | 3 | Nguyễn Thái Quang | "Những Mùa Đông Yêu Dấu" | Mỹ Linh's choice |
| Episode 19 (November 17) | Đàm Vĩnh Hưng | 4 | Nguyễn Song Tú | "Đừng Ngoảnh Lại" | Đàm Vĩnh Hưng's choice |
| Episode 19 (November 17) | Mỹ Linh | 5 | Dương Hoàng Yến | "Listen" | Eliminated |
| Episode 19 (November 17) | Quốc Trung | 6 | Đinh Thị My Hoàn | "Và Ta Đã Thấy Mặt Trời" | Eliminated |
| Episode 19 (November 17) | Đàm Vĩnh Hưng | 7 | Nguyễn Ngọc Trâm | "Những Ngày Yêu Như Mơ" | Eliminated |
| Episode 19 (November 17) | Hồng Nhung | 8 | Phạm Hà Linh | "Nước Mắt Mặt Trời" | Public's vote |
| Episode 19 (November 17) | Đàm Vĩnh Hưng | 9 | Vũ Thảo My | "Come Back To Me" | Public's vote |
| Episode 19 (November 17) | Hồng Nhung | 10 | Vũ Cát Tường | "Vết Mưa" | Hồng Nhung's choice |
| Episode 19 (November 17) | Quốc Trung | 11 | Trần Vũ Hà My | "Run" | Public's vote |
| Episode 19 (November 17) | Mỹ Linh | 12 | Nguyễn Hoàng Tôn | "Chỉ Có Thể Là Tình Yêu" | Public's vote |

=== Episodes 20–21: Semifinal (Top 8) ===
The two-part semi-finals aired on November 24 and December 8, 2012. Each contestant performed two solo songs, one on each show, and a group performance with their teammate and their coach. The result was announced at the end of night 2.

- Group performance: Jermaine Paul with Phạm Hà Linh, Vũ Cát Tường, Vũ Thảo My, Nguyễn Song Tú & Trần Vũ Hà My ("Roar"), team Hồng Nhung with Hồng Nhung ("Nhớ Mùa Thu Hà Nội"/"Em Còn Nhớ Hay Em Đã Quên"), team Mỹ Linh with Mỹ Linh ("Trưa Vắng"), team Quốc Trung with Quốc Trung ("Say Something"), team Đàm Vĩnh Hưng with Đàm Vĩnh Hưng ("Hãy Đàn Lên")
- Musical guest: Jermaine Paul ("Everybody"/"Open Arms"), Jermaine Paul & Bùi Anh Tuấn ("Without You")

| Coach | Contestant | Episode 20 (November 24) | | Episode 21 (December 8) | | Point | | | Result |
| Coach | Contestant | Order | First song | Order | Second song | Public | Coach | Total | Result |
|---|---|---|---|---|---|---|---|---|---|
| Hồng Nhung | Phạm Hà Linh | 1 | "Bóng Mây Đời Tôi" | 4 | "Cô Đơn" | 68.55 | 0 | 68.55 | Eliminated |
| Quốc Trung | Trần Thái Châu | 2 | "Hòn Đá Trong Vườn Tôi" | 8 | "1019, Chìa Khóa Bạc & Fin Cafe" | 65.46 | 30 | 95.46 | Eliminated |
| Mỹ Linh | Nguyễn Thái Quang | 3 | "Mây" | 1 | "You Raise Me Up" | 22 | 50 | 72 | Eliminated |
| Đàm Vĩnh Hưng | Nguyễn Song Tú | 4 | "Wrecking Ball" | 6 | "Dạ Khúc Cho Tình Nhân" | 18.5 | 50 | 68.5 | Eliminated |
| Quốc Trung | Trần Vũ Hà My | 5 | "Chuông Gió" | 7 | "Buồn" | 34.54 | 70 | 104.54 | Advanced |
| Mỹ Linh | Nguyễn Hoàng Tôn | 6 | "I Believe I Can Fly" | 2 | "Feel Your Love" | 78 | 50 | 128 | Advanced |
| Hồng Nhung | Vũ Cát Tường | 7 | "The Power of Love" | 3 | "Mẹ" | 31.45 | 100 | 131.45 | Advanced |
| Đàm Vĩnh Hưng | Vũ Thảo My | 8 | "Stronger (What Doesn't Kill You)" | 5 | "Con Yêu Mẹ" | 81.5 | 50 | 131.5 | Advanced |

=== Episodes 22: Finals (Top 4) ===
The Live Finale aired on December 15, 2013.

- Group performance: Terry McDermott with The Voice of Vietnam 1 top 4 – Hương Tràm, Đinh Hương, Xuân Nghi, Kiên Giang (Medley of "Silent Night"/"O Holy Night"/"Santa Claus Is Comin' to Town")
- Musical guest: Terry McDermott ("I Want to Know What Love Is"/"Let It Be")

| Coach | Artist | Order | First song | Order | Second song | Order | Duet song (with Coach) | Result |
|---|---|---|---|---|---|---|---|---|
| Đàm Vĩnh Hưng | Vũ Thảo My | 1 | "Bối Rối" | 5 | "Giọt Sương Bay Lên" | 9 | "A Time for Us" | Winner (37.01%) |
| Quốc Trung | Trần Vũ Hà My | 2 | "Giữa Đôi Bờ Xa Cách" | 7 | "Rơi" | 12 | "True Colors" | Fourth place (10.48%) |
| Mỹ Linh | Nguyễn Hoàng Tôn | 3 | "Hương Ngọc Lan" | 6 | "Illusion" | 10 | "Dành Cho Em"/"Gửi Anh" | Runner-up (27.81%) |
| Hồng Nhung | Vũ Cát Tường | 4 | "I Don't Know" | 8 | "Xin Cho Tôi" | 11 | "Papa" | Third place (24.69%) |

== Teams' Results ==
Artist's info

- Artist from Team Mỹ Linh
- Artist from Team Đàm Vĩnh Hưng
- Artist from Team Hồng Nhung
- Artist from Team Quốc Trung

Result details

- Winner
- Runner-up
- Third place
- Fourth Place
- Artist was saved by the public
- Artist was saved by his/her coach
- Artist was in the bottom two and had to sing-off
- Artist was eliminated

| Artist | Week 1+2+3 | Week 4+5 | Week 6 | Week 7+8 | Week 9 Finale |
|---|---|---|---|---|---|
| Trần Vũ Hà My | Safe | Safe | Safe | Safe | Fourth place |
| Trần Thái Châu | Safe | Sing-off | Safe | Eliminated | Eliminated (Week 8) |
| Đinh Thị My Hoàn | Sing-off | Safe | Eliminated | Eliminated (Week 6) | |
| Phạm Khánh Duy | Safe | Eliminated | Eliminated (Week 5) | | |
| Nguyễn Lâm Hoàng Phúc | Eliminated | Eliminated (Week 3) | | | |
| Vũ Cát Tường | Safe | Safe | Safe | Safe | Third place |
| Phạm Hà Linh | Safe | Safe | Safe | Eliminated | Eliminated (Week 8) |
| Âu Bảo Ngân | Safe | Sing-off | Eliminated | Eliminated (Week 6) | |
| Đỗ Thành Nam | Sing-off | Eliminated | Eliminated (Week 5) | | |
| Hoàng Nhật Minh | Eliminated | Eliminated (Week 3) | | | |
| Vũ Thảo My | Safe | Safe | Safe | Safe | Winner |
| Nguyễn Song Tú | Safe | Sing-off | Safe | Eliminated | Eliminated (Week 8) |
| Nguyễn Ngọc Trâm | Safe | Safe | Eliminated | Eliminated (Week 6) | |
| Nguyễn Trần Minh Sang | Sing-off | Eliminated | Eliminated (Week 5) | | |
| Nguyễn Văn Viết | Eliminated | Eliminated (Week 3) | | | |
| Nguyễn Hoàng Tôn | Safe | Safe | Safe | Safe | Runner-up |
| Nguyễn Thái Quang | Safe | Sing-off | Safe | Eliminated | Eliminated (Week 8) |
| Dương Hoàng Yến | Safe | Safe | Eliminated | Eliminated (Week 6) | |
| Trần Thị Diễm Hương | Sing-off | Eliminated | Eliminated (Week 5) | | |
| Trần Huyền My | Eliminated | Eliminated (Week 3) | | | |
