= When the Tenth Month Comes =

- Directed by: Đặng Nhật Minh
- Written by: Đặng Nhật Minh
- Starring: Lê Vân; Nguyen Hữu Mười; Nguyễn Minh Vương; Lại Phú Cường; Trịnh Phong
- Cinematography: Nguyen Manh Lan; Pham Phuc Dat
- Edited by: Hien Luong
- Music by: Phú Quang
- Production company: Vietnam Feature Film Studio
- Release date: 1984
- Running time: 82 minutes
- Country: Vietnam
- Language: Vietnamese

When the Tenth Month Comes (Vietnamese: Bao giờ cho đến tháng Mười) is a Vietnamese war film. The first Vietnamese film to be shown in the West after the Vietnam war, The film primarily centers around the misery of a young woman whose husband has died in the Cambodian–Vietnamese War. Despite the peaceful rural setting, the film is shot in black and white illustrating the oppressive and suffocating atmosphere of war. The theme of sadness and the inevitability of death dominates the film, uncovering a painful daily reality - a living imprint of Vietnam's history on the common people.

Since the actress Lê Vân played the title role of this film, her name has been closely linked to the character Duyên, the wife of the sacrificed fighter, a symbol of the fate of thousands, even millions of Vietnamese women in the face of war. Minh wanted to represent and embody this figure of the soldier's companion but also show the difficulties experienced by peasants in their daily life during the war.

The film was important in establishing the career of director Dang Nhat Minh internationally and it was also subject to multiple governmental reviews.

== Plot ==
The story takes place in North Vietnam near the end of the Vietnam war. Duyên is an actress in a theatrical troupe whose husband is away fighting on the front in South Vietnam. After going to the South for what should have been a visit to her husband, she learns that he had been dead for a year, killed in battle. With the help of Khang, a local schoolteacher and amateur poet, she tries to hide this devastating news from everyone, especially from her father in-law who is ill and has already lost his other son to war a few years ago. At Duyên's request, Khang forges new letters from her husband which she can then show to her family. Her lie becomes something that she hopes to be true; that her husband is here again and that the letters are real.

Through this process, Khang falls in love with the beautiful widow. This provokes anger among the villagers and Khang is forced to move on, transferred to another school in a different village. It is only when the soldier's death is officially announced towards the end of the film that the villagers realise that they had misjudged the two protagonists.

== Cast ==
- Lê Vân as Duyên
- Nguyen Hữu Mười as Khang
- Nguyễn Minh Vương as Thơm
- Đặng Lưu Việt Bảo as Nam (Duyên's husband)
- Lại Phú Cường as Duyên's father-in-law
- Trịnh Phong as Cháu Tuần
- Hoàng Yến as Mrs. Hiến
- Hoàng Long as the son-in-law
- Thúy Vinh as the daughter
- Thanh Thủy as the daughter-in-law
- Tiến Tho as the village god
- Đinh Thắng as Sửu

== Controversy and censorship ==
After authorities reviewed the screenplay numerous times, they forewarned Dang Nhat Minh that he would be allowed to make the film under the condition that the widow whose husband died in the war must not fall in love with the village's teacher. Dang Nhat Minh agreed but still tried to imply it in the film. The film screening for authorities went smoothly; however, the authorities raised another concern for a scene that looked "superstitious" where Duyen's late husband appears in long flashbacks or dream-like sequences, alluding to a ghost like figure. Dang Nhat Minh defended the scene, insisting that it was an essential characteristic of Vietnamese culture.

The film was reviewed 13 times in total, making Dang Nhat Minh feel like he was a criminal dragged to trials after trials. At last, the scene was allowed to be screened but had to be shortened.

== Reception ==
Originally released internationally under the name “The Love Doesn’t Come Back”, it was the first Vietnamese film shown in the West after 1975, and was selected for many international film festivals.

While the film is often mistakenly described by Western critics as a Vietnam War film, it actually takes place during the border war between Vietnamese and Khmer Rouge forces, which began in 1978.

== Awards ==
The film is a recipient of numerous awards. It received the Golden Lotus Award and the Award for Best Director at the 1985 Vietnam Film Festival. It was also the winner of the Special Jury Award at the 1985 Hawaii International Film Festival. At the 1985 Moscow International Film Festival, it was nominated for the Golden Prize, and at the 1985 Nantes Three Continents Festival it was nominated for the Golden Montgolfiere.

In 2008, it was named “one of the greatest Asian films of all times” by CNN.

Year	Award	Category	Recipient	Result	Source
1985	Hawaii International Film Festival	Special Jury Award	—N/a	Won	
1985	14th Moscow International Film Festival	Golden Prize	—N/a	Nominated	
1985	14th Moscow International Film Festival	Soviet Peace Committee Award	—N/a	Won	
1985	Nantes Three Continents Festival	Golden Montgolfiere	—N/a	Nominated	
1985	7th Vietnam Film Festival	Feature film	—N/a	Golden Lotus	
1985	7th Vietnam Film Festival	Best Director	Đặng Nhật Minh	Won	
1985	7th Vietnam Film Festival	Best Actor	Hữu Mười	Won	
1985	7th Vietnam Film Festival	Best Actress	Lê Vân	Won	
1985	7th Vietnam Film Festival	Best Cinematography	Nguyễn Mạnh Lân	Won	
1985	7th Vietnam Film Festival	Best Art Design	Nguyễn Văn Vý	Won	
1985	7th Vietnam Film Festival	Best Original Score	Phú Quang	Won	
1989	Asia-Pacific Film Festival	Special Jury Award	—N/a	Won	

== Sources ==
- Film Institute and Archives (1994). Diễn viên điện ảnh Việt Nam [Vietnamese film actors and actress] (in Vietnamese). Hà Nội: Nhà xuất bản Văn hóa Thông tin. OCLC 33133770.
- Nguyễn, Thị Hồng Ngát (2005). Lịch sử điện ảnh Việt Nam [History of Vietnamese cinema] (in Vietnamese). Vol. 2. Hà Nội: Vietnam Film Bureau. OCLC 53129383.
- Many authors (2007). Hành trình nghiên cứu điện ảnh Việt Nam (in Vietnamese). Hà Nội: Nhà xuất bản Văn hóa thông tin. OCLC 989966481.
- Trần, Tuấn Hiệp (2002). Điện ảnh không phải trò chơi: tập phê bình, tiểu luận điện ảnh (in Vietnamese). Hà Nội: Nhà xuất bản Văn hóa thông tin. OCLC 605594880.
