= Hồng Nhung =

Vietnamese singer (born 1970)

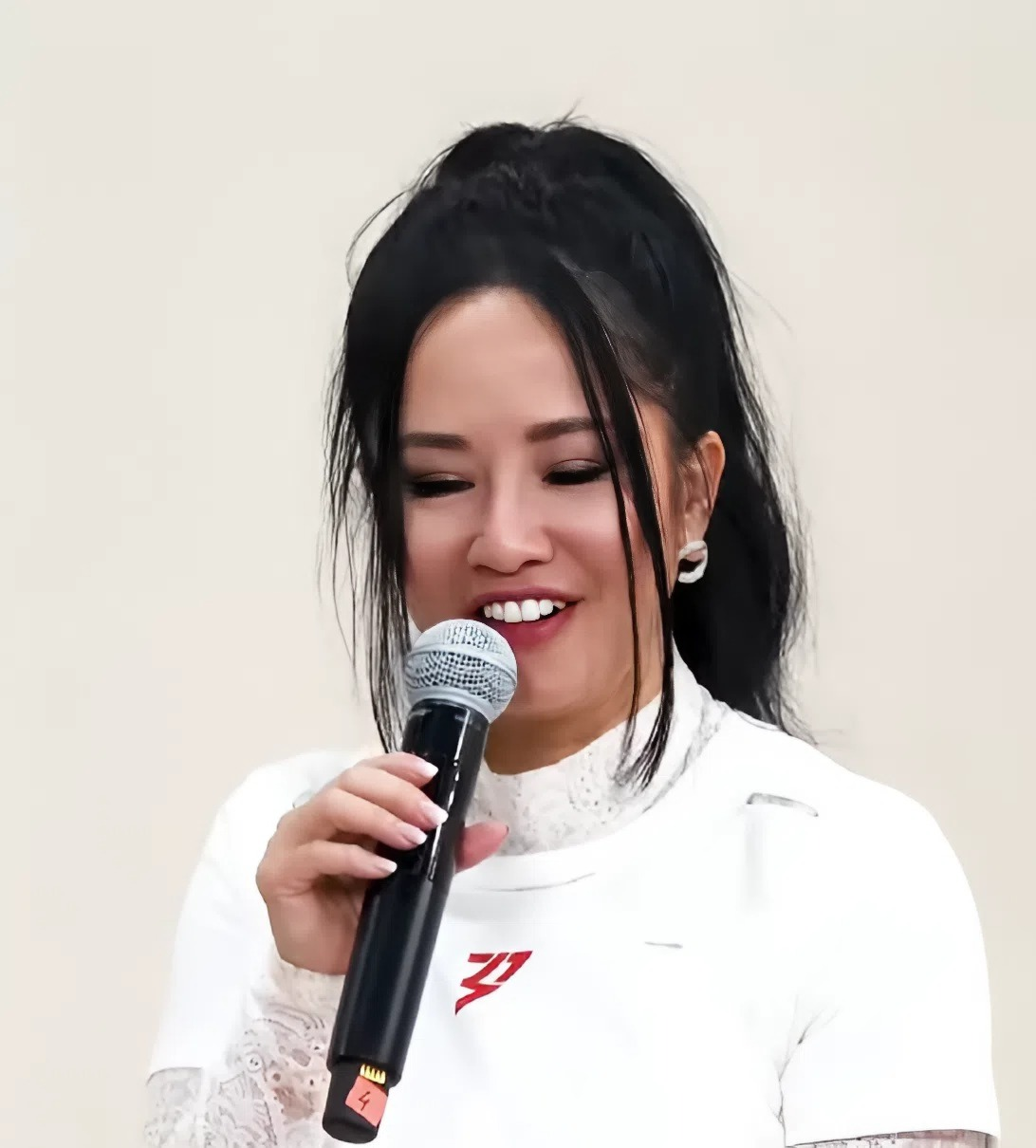
- Hồng Nhung in 2023

Background information
- Born: Lê Hồng Nhung; March 15, 1970 (age 56)
- Origin: Hanoi, North Vietnam
- Genres: Pop; soul; world; new-age; electronic
- Instrument: Vocals
- Years active: 1985–

Lê Hồng Nhung (born March 15, 1970) is a Vietnamese singer, a prominent figure in her country's pop music scene since the 1990s. She is especially associated with songs by Trịnh Công Sơn. She has been described as one of "the four divas of Vietnam". Later singers inspired by her include Mỹ Tâm, Tùng Dương, Uyên Linh, Noo Phước Thịnh and Vũ Cát Tường.

She became famous since early ages as exposing impressive vocal. She was partially influenced by Sinead O'Connor and Whitney Houston. She is also active in many campaigns such as being an ambassador for rhino and bear conservation awareness; participating in music shows against pedophilia, and other charity activities. Besides, she is also admired for her intelligence in both working ethnic and communication.

She has performed many songs from songwriters like Văn Cao, Dương Thụ, Tran Tien, Phú Quang, Quốc Trung, Thanh Tùng, Hong Dang, Tu Huy, Duy Thai, Tran Quang Loc, Bao Chan, Bao Phuc, Quoc Bao, and Huy Tuan. The most successful were songs by songwriter-composer Trịnh Công Sơn - a legend of Vietnam's music industry. He wrote many songs for her only, including: "Bong Bong Oi", "Bong Khong La Bong", and "Thuo Bong La Nguoi".

== Career ==
When she was 10 years old, she registered an exam at Children Culture House of Hanoi and later became a member of Hoa Mi group.

When she was 11 years old, she recorded her first song Loi Chao Cua Em (written by Nghiem Ba Hong) at Voice of Vietnam Station and performed in Mang Non performance group of Ha Noi. The record was saved by her family up to now and they play it sometimes.

Later, she became representative for children of Ha Noi to perform oversea.

When she was 15 years old, she won the golden medal of Nation's Professional Show in Hai Phong with the performance of Dieu Oi Cho Em Bay written by Nguyen Cuong. Then she met songwriter Dương Thụ and led by him into singing career.

One year later, she met songwriter Quang Vinh and enrolled at Ballad Music Group and started professional singing career, and became instantly famous.

In 1984, she represented Vietnam by participating in the International Festival of Art in Libya

In 1987, she was chosen to attend Hanoi's Best Vocal contest while she was only in first year of Ha Noi's Art Institute and eventually won first prize for the performance of the song Nho Ve Ha Noi. This was the big turn of her career.

In September 1991, she won the first prize of 2nd National Solo Ballad Song contest for the performance of the song Hay Den Voi Em (written by Duy Thai), Vi Sao Anh Khong Den (written by Tu Huy) and Nothing Compares To You (Sinead O'Connor).

She followed her dad to Ho Chi Minh City when she was 20 years old, here she had a meet up with late songwriter Trịnh Công Sơn and they both had a friendship related to music as this was also the great turn of her music career and influenced her music style.

In 1988, she released her first album Tieng Hat Hong Nhung. Later, she officially attended Ballad Performance Group and became one of the top ballad singers of Vietnam as she continued to perform at music shows.

In 1989, she performed at Ballad Festival in Berlin and 19th International Festival in North Korea.

=== Activities of 1990s ===
In 1990, she had a chance to perform in Iraq.

In 1991, she performed in China and Singapore as well as in the process of recording album Sao Anh Khong Den including five Vietnamese songs and four foreign songs.

In 1992, she performed in Russia, Poland, Korea and China and met later songwriter Trinh Cong Son, later she started to sing his songs with her own style.

In 1993, she joined Duyen Dang Viet Nam 1 show. The first Trinh Cong Son album title Bong Bong Oi made a new impact, as this was the new chapter of her career later on.

In 1995, she released her fourth album Chot Nghe Em Hat - as to be the first ever theme album included many songs from La Van Cuong and Tran Quang Loc. One of the songs Co Doi Khi was hit when it made to the top ten of Green Wave Music chart.

In 1997, she released music video Doa Hoa Vo Thuong. The music video was scripted as a story with open ending. It was said to be a big leap at that time as all the music videos had no proper script. Doa Hoa Vo Thuong became one of the top ballad music video of all times in Vietnam.

In 2002, she was the first Vietnamese singer to join annual International Asian Music Festival in Singapore alongside Tran Manh Tuan for the performance of the song Inh La Oi, Ngay Khong Mua, Ru Tinh, Ho Tren Nui. She also collaborated with composer Craig Armstrong for the soundtrack for the movie The Quiet American and had a cameo in the movie.

In 2003, she was chosen to perform the song "Vi Mot The Gioi Ngay Mai", SEA Games 22's official theme song which was operated in Ha Noi.

She was rated to be one of divas of Vietnam music industry, alongside Thanh Lam, Mỹ Linh, Trần Thu Hà.

Attaining vocal techniques and experience in performing, she was one of the coaches for singing contests like Vietnam Idol, The Voice of Vietnam.

In 2011, she was the judge of the contest "Sang Bung Suc Song", a reality show searching for a girl group.

In 2013, she was one of the coaches (alongside Quoc Trung, Dam Vinh Hung and My Linh) for The Voice Vietnam season 2.

In July 2014, she and other Vietnamese stars joined along with ENV for the campaign "I support wild animals conservation" with the theme "Act for Bears in Vietnam - Ending Bear Imprisonment" as an action to forbid hunting, trading and selling wild animals.

On September 8, 2014, she went to South Africa as an ambassador of Vietnam crew to figure out the massacre of rhino and the consequences of rhino horns consumption in Asian countries, Vietnam included.

In 2014 and 2015, she was the judge of the contest "Tuyet Dinh Tranh Tai" which was a contest for professional singers trying many different music genres.

On September 12, 2015, she and Ha Anh Tuan were invited by Rhinos Foundation to attend Rhinos Conservation Program.

On November 16, 2016, in Ha Noi, she and Thanh Bui with comedian Xuan Bac had met up with Prince William to talk about wild animals conservation, especially rhinos.

On May 30, 2017, she and Thu Minh, Doan Trang, Thao Trang, Tra My and Truong Quynh Anh participated in a community project of Trang Phap which is to raise awareness and search for solution to protect children from pedophile.

=== 2017: Pho a, Pho oi... ===
On December 16, 2017, she held a press conference to introduce her 11th studio album titled Pho a, Pho oi... in Ho Chi Minh City. There was the attendance of Miss Universe 2007 Riyo Mori and Vũ Cát Tường.

=== 2018 ===
On May 6, 2018, she joined the show The Oriental Mood of Tran Manh Tuan and Nguyen Le at VOH Music One theater, Ho Chi Minh City. As being a guest, she performed the song Beo Dat May Troi. On May 26, she was invited to Prince Frederik's 50th birthday party at Palace Christiansborg, Denmark. On June 20, the Music Festival which was operated by The Ambassador of Italia Cecillia Piccioni, in the festival, she performed Voi Che Sepete (Mozart) and Nho Mua Thu Ha Noi (Trinh Cong Son) along with the pianist Dang Quang.

== Personal life ==
Hồng Nhung's first marriage was with a Vietnamese man, but they separated shortly after. Her second husband is an American businessman named Kevin Gilmore. They became engaged at the end of June 2007 at Vũng Tàu, and were married in July 2011. In 2012, Hồng Nhung gave birth to twins on the Easter's Eve in the United States. Hồng Nhung and Gilmore filed for divorce in June 2018.

== Discography ==
=== Studio albums ===
- Đoản Khúc Thu Hà Nội (1997)
- Bài Hát Ru Cho Anh (1999)
- Ru Tình (2000)
- Cháu Vẽ Ông Mặt Trời (2001)
- Ngày Không Mưa (2002)
- Thuở Bống Là Người (2003)
- Một Ngày Mới (2003)
- Khu Vườn Yên Tĩnh (2004)
- Như Cánh Vạc Bay (2006)
- Vì Ta Cần Nhau (with Quang Dũng) (2007)
- Có Đâu Bao Giờ (with Quang Dũng) (2009)
- Vòng Tròn (2011)
- Phố À, Phố Ơi... (2017)
- Tuổi Thơ Tôi (2020)
- Bống Là Ai? (2023)
- Đài phát thanh công cộng (2024)
- Hát về Hà Nội (2025)
- Cảm ơn (2025)

=== Compilation albums ===
- Hồng Nhung & Những Bài Top Ten (1998)

=== Video albums ===
- Bống Bồng Ơi (1998)
- Bài Hát Ru Cho Anh (2000)
- Như Cánh Vạc Bay (2007)
- Vì Ta Cần Nhau (with Quang Dũng) (2008)

== Filmography ==
- Saving the Death (2009)
