= Trần Thu Hà =

Vietnamese singer and producer (born 1977)

- Trần Thu Hà in 2025
- Born: Trần Thu Hà; 26 August 1977 (age 49); Hanoi, Vietnam
- Occupation: Singer
- Years active: 1998–present
- Father: Trần Hiếu
- Musical career
- Genres: Electronica; alternative rock; pop; indie pop; world music
- Occupations: Singer; producer
- Instruments: Vocals, keyboards, piano
- Years active: 1998–present
- Labels: Ha Tran Productions; Thuy Nga Entertainments; Youth Pictures
- Website: www.hatranmusic.com, www.hatranproductions.com

Trần Thu Hà, otherwise known as Hà Trần (born 26 August 1977), is a Vietnamese singer and producer.

== Career ==
=== 1998–2001: Em về tinh khôi (Purity) and Bài tình cho giai nhân (Love Songs For Beauty) ===
Hà Trần's first studio collaboration with Bằng Kiều Wake up eglantine, produced by Hãng phim Trẻ (Youth Pictures) in 1998, includes songs composed by Dương Thụ, Bảo Chấn, Trần Tiến, and Ngọc Châu . The album gained them both recognition throughout the country and made Hà Trần one of the best-selling new artists at the time.

In 1999, Hà Trần released her debut studio album Purity, which was produced by musician Quốc Bảo. A series of hits from this album established her pop star status including "Purity" (Quốc Bảo), "Lời ru cho con" (Lullaby) (Xuân Phương – theme for drama of Của đề dành (Inherit)), "Tóc gió thôi bay" (Trần Tiến), "Ngày em đến" (Từ Huy) and these earned her the title "Person of The Year" among the most high-profile entertainers.

In 2000, her second solo album Love Songs For Beauty, co-produced by Quốc Bảo, included the songs: "Đêm cô đơn" (Lonely night), "Hãy yêu nhau đi" (Love to love) a duet with Diva Thanh Lam, "Dấu phố em qua", "Em về tóc xanh", and "Chờ em nơi thềm trăng". Both of her albums received positive critiques and became best-selling albums of all-time under her label Youth Pictures. However, she later departed from them and went freelance, releasing other collaborations with her uncle Trần Tiến. Tự họa (Self-portrait) became a national best-selling record, which opened a new chapter of her career, marked by records like: "Em vẫn như ngày xưa" (Forever young), "Dòng sông mùa thu" (River and the Fall), "Phố nghèo" (Old Town), "Tóc gió thôi bay", "Sắc màu" (Colors), "Chị tôi" (My sister), and "Thành phố trẻ" (City of the Youth).

In April, Hà's live performance in FM Blue Wave Awards of the song "Colors" led to its success in sales. She was voted Top 10 Singers by radio program of FM Làn sóng xanh (Blue Wave Awards) from 1998 to 2001 and also won the title "Most Favorite Singer" of Mai Vàng (Golden Orchid Awards), 2000. Later that year, Hà Trần took part in a live concert Chiều Hà Nội (Hanoi evening) created by musician Vũ Quang Trung to promote their previous jazz collaborations. Lullaby for Your Eyes (1999) features saxophonist Trần Mạnh Tuấn. Many songs were performed by Hà Trần, including "Tiếng mưa", "Lời cuối tình yêu", and "Anh yêu em." These expanded her influence as a multi-style soloist.

During 1998–2001, Hà Trần participated in other collaborations including: Môi hồng đào 1,2,3 (Red lips); Nghe mưa 2 (Listen to the rain) (with songs composed by Bảo Chấn and Dương Thụ), Thanh Tùng Love songs 1 & 2, Vừa biết dấu yêu (Puberty), series of Quốc Bảo's albums (Ngồi hát ca bềnh bồng, Vàng son) and ứa featured in many popular concerts such as Duyên dáng Việt Nam, Đồng Vọng Bốn Mùa, Dòng thời gian, Mai Vàng Awards, etc.

=== 2001–02: Nhật thực (Solar eclipse) ===
In 2002, Hà Trần and musician Ngọc Đại performed Nhật thực (Solar eclipse) live show throughout Vietnam to promote their album, also named Nhật thực (Solar eclipse). Songs on the album were written by Ngọc Đại and with lyrics from poems of Vi Thùy Linh. Composer Đỗ Bảo also contributed, along with singers Minh Anh – Minh Ánh (2M band). The live show was created by choreographer Quỳnh Lan, vision director Việt Tú and the stage decorator Trần Vũ Hoàng (Hà's brother).

Nhật thực faced a number of issues upon release. There was a copyright dispute between Hà and Hồng Nhung for the song "Det tam gai" (Weaving Tam Gai). In December 2001, the Performance Administration raised concern that the lyrics on the album were such that they may "cause bad effects to the culture and ethic of Vietnamese music" (Mr. Lê Nam – Director of the Administration). Therefore, the album was delayed, so that the artist could revise the track listing and make amendments to some lyrics.

After settling the above matters, the show took place in April 2002, and then Nhật thực, the album, was released in May. It includes seven songs: "Nghi ngại" (Shadow of doubt), "Đừng hát tình ca du mục nữa" (Don't sing the nomad's love song), "Phía ngày nắng tắt" (Other side of sunset), "Dệt tầm gai" (Weaving Tam Gai), "Tiếc nuối" (Regret), "Ảo ảnh" (Illusion), "Nhật thực" (Solar eclipse). Two songs "Mơ" (Dreaming) and "Tự tình" were removed, reducing the album from originally nine to now seven songs, and "Cây nữ tu" was changed to the new name of "Ảo ảnh". Nhật thực was promoted as a concept album, with a completed story of seven songs expressing seven stories told by a girl in love expressing feelings of desperation, doubt, regret and obsession.

The show became a special music event, soon after its release, and was then voted by presses as one of the most important cultural phenomena of 2002, a landmark of innovation in music in terms of its original style and performance in Vietnam. In addition, the existence of Nhật thực is said to have oriented the music audiences in Vietnam to be interested in music harmony, arrangement and mix of an album. Nhật thực was also an important step in the career of Hà Trần, causing a notable development in her style, described as stronger, more distinctive, and more diverse. As from Nhật thực, Hà was called one of the four divas of Vietnamese music.

Nevertheless, after success of the first show, dispute arose among the members of the show, Ngọc Đại – Trần Thu Hà – Vi Thuỳ Linh. As a result, after Nhật thực 1, Trần Thu Hà announced to the press that she had quit Nhat thuc. Ngọc Đại continued with his own Nhật thực 2 in 2003, without Hà Trần and Vi Thuỳ Linh, but there were many stars of Vietnam such as: Thanh Lam, Hồ Quỳnh Hương, Linh Dung, Tùng Dương, Khánh Linh, Ngọc Khuê... However, "Nhat Thuc 2" live concert and the album (sold at a special price of ₫6,000, equal to about US$0.5 at the time) were not as successful as the first.

=== 2002–04: Thanh Lam – Hà Trần ===
In October 2002, Hà Trần and Mỹ Linh went to San Jose, California, USA for a charity show. The show was held by Vnhelp to raise funds for underprivileged students. Hà Trần not only performed her hits but also sang many prewar songs, such as "Yêu" (To love) (Văn Phụng), "Hương xưa" (Memory of Incense) (Cung Tiến)... At the same time, a famous rock band of Vietnam The Wall noted that they would only invite Hà Trần to their show, but she could not participate.

In November 2002, Hà performed with Ian Shaw in the special show held by British Council.

In 2003, her voice appeared on vol.3 of Quoc Bao – Bình yên (Peaceful) with the songs "Bình yên", "Gió" (Windy), "Tình ca" (Love Song), "Là yêu chưa từng yêu" (To love as the beginner), "Tình ơi" (Dearest). "Bình yên" a duet song with her father – Trần Hiếu – received wide praise from the audience. Her voice in the song of "Là yêu chưa từng yêu" was taken in to Hotel Vietnam album of Japanese musician, Makoto Katoba.

In April 2003, she appeared in the second live show of The Wall band with the song "Khám phá" (Discovery) as a female rocker.

In August 2003, she was invited to be a judge of the Sao Mai Singers' Contest (former name: National Music Festival of VTV) when she was 26, the youngest judge in the history of the national music contest to date.

In October 2003, Hà held a live show in the series of Âm nhạc và những người bạn (Music and friends show) with theme of Colors. This show was supported by Vietnam Television and live broadcast on VTV3 channel with the participation of Ha's friends: Trần Hiếu, Trần Tiến, Thanh Lam, Phương Thanh, Nguyễn Ngọc Ánh, 5 Dòng Kẻ, etc.

In 2004, Hà cooperated with her friend, Thanh Lam, to release the album Thanh Lam – Hà Trần. The album included songs written by Trịnh Công Sơn, Thuận Yến, Kim Ngọc, Niels Lan Doky, Lê Minh Sơn and Thanh Lam (Thanh Lam wrote some songs for this album). While most of the songs were duets, Hà Trần had 3 solo songs "Sao đổi ngôi" (Kim Ngọc), "Chạy trốn" (Lê Minh Sơn) and "Trái tim lang thang" (Thanh Lam). At the same time, Hà also participated in Nghiêng nghiêng rừng chiều album of Nguyễn Cường with 2 songs "Cho tình yêu bay lên bồng bềnh" and "Để em mơ".

In October 2004, Hà Trần participated in the Lời của giòng sông – Trịnh Công Sơn and guitar. The album included five classic solo guitar songs and eight songs with singer and guitar, in which Hà Trần sang 4 Tình xa, Tình nhớ, Mưa hồng, Xin trả nợ người.

Ha was married in 2004 with a person of Vietnamese heritage in the United States. She later moved to the United States with her husband.

=== 2004–05: Hà Trần 98-03 ===
Since moving to the United States, Hà has collaborated with Thúy Nga and had some performances in Paris By Night.

In 2005, Hà released Hà Trần 98-03. The album included remixed versions of Hà Trần's hits from 1998 to 2003: Mùa xuân gọi, Phố nghèo, Dòng sông mùa thu, Sắc màu, Chuyện tình thảo nguyên (Trần Tiến), Lời chưa nói (Xuân Phương – theme of drama Phía trước là bầu trời), Mưa tháng giêng (Việt Hùng – Nguyễn Việt Chiến), Tình ca, Em về tóc xanh, Em về tinh khôi (Quốc Bảo), Hoa gạo (Ngọc Đại – Phan Huyền Thư). The album was released in the USA under the name of Sắc màu – Tình ca by Thúy Nga, with an additional song Tiến thoài lưỡng nan. The album has 3 tracks recorded with some American musicians in 510 Studios, Fremont, California.

In July 2005, she performed in Miss Vietnamese USA Contest. In November 2005, Hà came back to Vietnam to perform as main actress in the musical Mythology Night dedicated to Trinh Cong Son by Phuong Nam Film. She sang three songs: Nắng thuỷ tinh (duet with Quang Dũng), Lời thiên thu gọi, Tự tình khúc (with 5 Dòng kẻ).

=== 2006: Communication 06 ===
In September 2006, Hà released the 5th album Communication 06 (Đối thoại 06). This album was the first album produced by Hà Trần Productions (a company founded by Hà Trần in 2005) implemented with her coordinators: musician Trần Tiến, Nguyễn Xinh Xô, Thanh Phương, Ben Doan (her husband), and 2 American sound engineers John Vestman and Max Neutra. The album was recorded at Kingkong Music Group (North Hollywood), Sound Matrix and Vestman Studio in Orange County, California and was published by Viết Tân Studio. The album was also released in the US, and was sold on some websites, such as CD Baby, Amazon, Target.

Communication 06 was released as a conversation between Eastern (Vietnam) and Western music (the United States), as well as between 2 musical generations, Nguyễn Xinh Xô and Trần Tiến. It was released by an independent label under the ambient/trip hop/electronic genre, and included songs by Trần Tiến (Ra ngõ mà yêu, Bình nguyên xa vắng, Mưa bay tháp cổ, Lữ khách sông Hồng and Quê nhà) and Nguyễn Xinh Xô (Giấc mơ lạ, Nước sâu). There were 3 instrumental tracks: Tiếng gọi (The Calling) by Ben Doan & Hà Trần, outro Quê nhà(Nolstagia) by Thanh Phương and Without by Ben Doan & Hà Trần.

After release, the album led to debates and controversies in Vietnam on the value of such music. The album also drew the interest of both audiences and music critics, with Hà Trần going on to win for Best Album at the Cống Hiến Contribution Awards (a culture and sports newspaper).

=== 2007: Tình ca qua thế kỷ (Century of love songs) ===
In 2007, Hà participated in Paris By Night 90, 88, 86, 85, 84, 83, 82, 78. She had two duets with Bằng Kiều in his album: Vá lại tình tôi: Bây giờ tháng mấy (Từ Công Phụng) and Cho quên thu đau thương (Main dans la main). She acted as judge again in the PBN Talent Show. Hà was also featured in the debut album of new singer Hòa Trần by duet song Lời ru cho con (Lullaby) (Xuân Phương). Hà Trần, Thanh Lam and Tùng Dương also performed on the album for Trần Viết Tân – Biệt.

In July 2007, Hà Trần production cooperated with Thúy Nga to release album Tình ca qua thế kỷ (century of love songs). This album included prewar songs of Từ Công Phụng, Ngọc Bích, Đức Huy, Tùng Giang, Trịnh Công Sơn, Đoàn Chuẩn, Ngô Thụy Miên, Nguyễn Ánh 9, arranged by Thanh Phương, Nguyễn Xinh Xô, Nguyễn Nhân, Shane Barber. It included some live performances from Paris By Night: Tình khúc tháng 6 and Đường xa ướt mưa – duet with Bằng Kiều (PBN82), Cô đơn – Nguyễn Ánh 9 (PBN83), Giọt lệ thiên thu – duet with Khánh Ly, guitar Thanh Phương (PBN84). The album was only published in the USA due to some political issues.

=== 2008: Trần Tiến ===
In 2008, Hà Trần Production released album the first musician's album Trần Tiến. Beside Hà Trần, the album included contributions by Tùng Dương, Hòa T. Trần and David Trần.

In September 2008, Hà performed on Đỗ Bảo's albumThời gian để yêu. The songs "Bài ca tháng 6" (Song for June) and "Câu trả lời" (The answer) was popular with the Vietnamese audience right after its release. At the end of 2008, Hà danced and sang on PBN95 with song Ra ngõ mà yêu (Leaving the alley).

In March 2009, the album Tran Tien was nominated for 2008 Best Album of Cong Hien Contribution Awards (culture and sports newspaper), with winners voted by music critics and newspapers/magazines in Vietnam. Tran Tien lost by 6 votes to first-place winner Do Bao album Thoi gian de yeu.

=== 2009–10: Minimal Beast ===
In 2009, Hà continued performing in some productions by Thúy Nga Paris By Night and travelled to Vietnam for several shows, including "Khúc giao mùa", "Bóng ai qua thềm", "Duyên Dáng Việt Nam 21". She also worked on new material and collaborated with the electronic project Whodat (www.Myspace.com/whodatmusic), co-producing and singing 4 songs in English and Vietnamese. The result was a collective album called Minimal Beasts, and in December 2009, the first single Stroma won the people's choice prize of Bài Hát Việt show in Vietnam. This song was dedicated for the love of nature, describing the relationship between humans and the Earth. Hà Trần Productions released Minimal Beasts in the U.S. in March 2010.

=== 2012–13: Đỗ Bảo – Hà Trần: Chuyện của Mặt Trời, Chuyện của Chúng ta ===
Đỗ Bảo – Hà Trần: Chuyện của Mặt Trời, Chuyện của Chúng Ta was released in 2013 and garnered critical acclaim. The first pressing of 2,000 CDs sold out within three days of its release. The album was produced over a period of 18 months via telecommunication with Do Bao in Ha Noi, Vietnam and Tran Thu Ha in Southern California, USA. The post-production took 10 days at a full-fledged studio in Boston. Some of fans' favorite are: Chuyện tôi yêu, Đôi Giày Lười, Thời gian để yêu, Kế Hoạch Làm Bạn, and Bài Ca Cây Đàn. In December 2013, Đỗ Bảo & Hà Trần organized a few concerts in Hanoi and Ho Chi Minh City with great success. In January 2014, Đỗ Bảo – Hà Trần: Chuyện của Mặt Trời, Chuyện của Chúng ta was nominated for 4 Cống Hiến Awards, including Album of The Year, Singer of The Year, Concert of the Year, and Composer of the Year. The awards took place on April 22, 2014, in Hanoi.

=== 2024: Những con sông ngón tay (OST Mai) ===
On February 13, 2024, Hà Trần released Những con sông ngón tay on YouTube channel for Trấn Thành.

== Awards ==
- Album Tran Tien received second place category the Best Album of Contribution Awards, 2008.
- Album Communication 06 won the Best Album of Contribution Awards in 2006 and Top 10 Albums by Labor Newspaper and Album of the year on Nhacso.net dedicated by online viewers, 2006.
- Album Nhật Thực (Solar Eclipse) with Ngọc Đại, Đỗ Bảo and Vi Thùy Linh was voted as cultural phenomenon by National Newspapers, 2002.
- Most favorite singer of Mai Vang Awards (Golden Orchid Awards), 2000.
- Top 10 Vietnamese Singers since 1998 by FM Radio South Vietnam.
- Most Favorite Television Performer by Hanoi Broadcast Center, 1997
- Best Recording Artist by Vietnam Musician Association, 1996.
- Gold Medal of National Professional Voices, 1995.
- Third Place of the Oriole Singer "Tiếng hát Vàng Anh" held by Japan Television NHK and Horitro Productions, 1995.
- First Class of National Student Voices Festival, 1994.
- Most Potential Face of Hanoi Best New Voice, 1993.

== Albums ==
=== Solo albums ===
- To the Core (2016)
- Timeless Classics Vol. 2 (2014)
- Timeless Classics (2007) – Only in the USA
- Communication 06 (2006)
- Hà Trần 98-03 (in Vietnam) and Sắc Màu – Love songs (in the USA) (2005)
- Eclipse (2002)
- Songs for Beauty (2000)
- Purity (1999)

=== Collaborations ===
- Giang Sol's album Shadow of Jazz (2015)
- Longbow 3: Chuyện của Mặt Trời, Chuyện của Chúng Ta (2013)
- Đỗ Bảo's second album Thời Gian Để Yêu (2008)
- Trần Tiến (2008)
- Đỗ Bảo's first album Cánh Cung (2004)
- Thanh Lam – Hà Trần (2004)
- Lời Ru Mắt Em – with Vũ Quang Trung and Trần Mạnh Tuấn (2001)
- Self Portrait – with Trần Tiến (2000)
- Dòng Sông Lơ Đãng – with Bằng Kiều (1998)
- Featured in 3 Quoc Bao's album Bình Yên (Peaceful 2002), Vàng Son (2000), Ngồi Ca Hát Bềnh Bồng (1999) and many more....
