= Thanh Lam =

Vietnamese singer

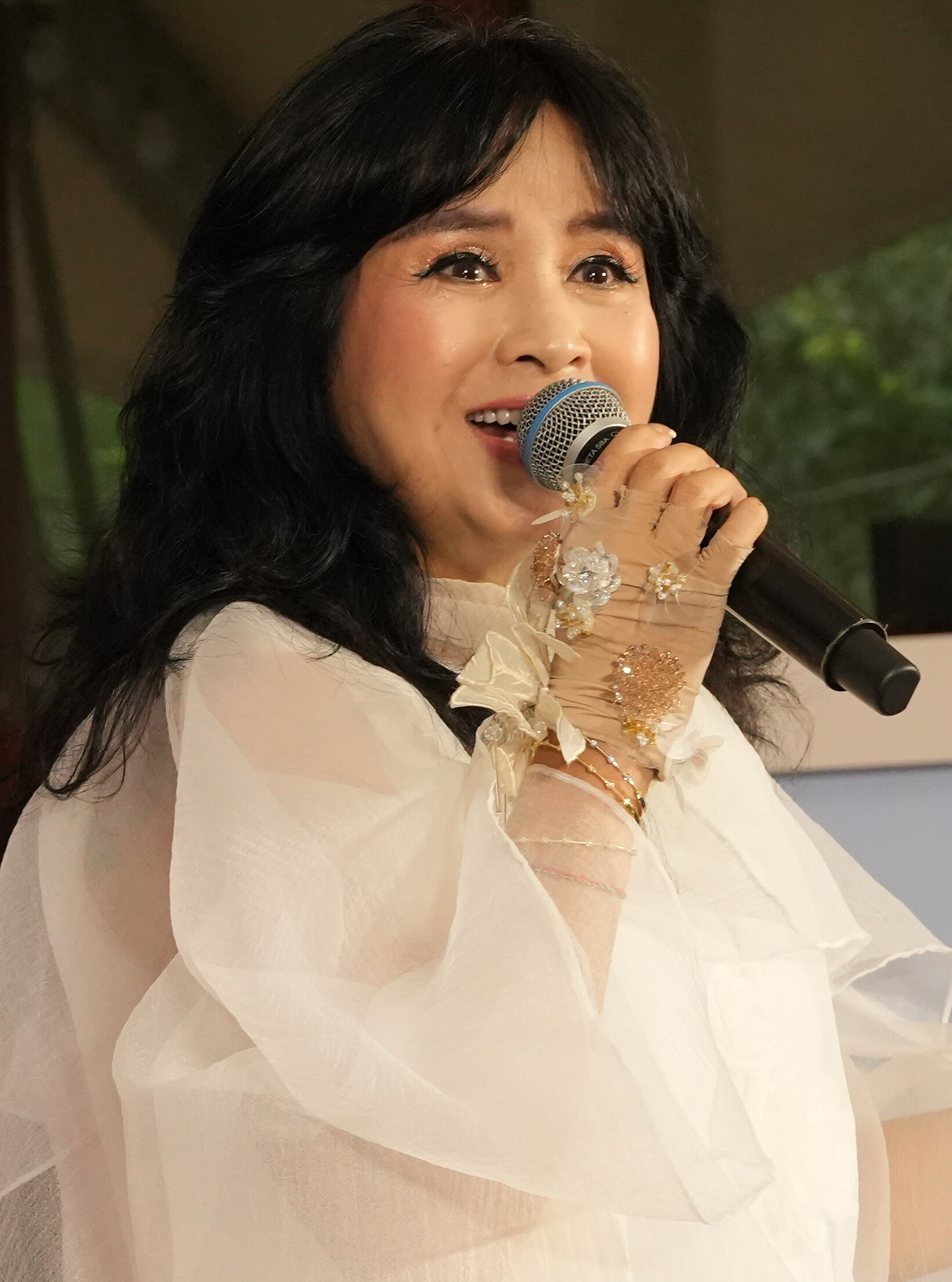
- Thanh Lam in 2025

Background information
- Born: Đoàn Thanh Lam; 19 June 1969 (age 57)
- Origin: Hanoi, Vietnam
- Genres: Pop; jazz; folk
- Occupation: Singer
- Years active: 1981–

Vietnamese name
- Vietnamese: Thanh Lam
- Literal meaning: Beautifully blue

Đoàn Thanh Lam (born 19 June 1969) is a Vietnamese singer.

== Biography ==
Đoàn Thanh Lam was born in Hanoi to music composer Thuận Yến and traditional music artist Thanh Hương. She has one younger brother, Trí Minh. At the age of nine, Thanh Lam started studying đàn tỳ bà, a Vietnamese traditional music instrument, at the Hanoi Conservatory of Music. In 1985, she switched to study Vocal Music. This was an important turning-point in her music career. After winning several singing contests, she became famous with her father's song, Chia Tay Hoàng Hôn (Farewell Sunset) in the National Professional Solo Singer contest in 1991. Her father has been a strong supporter in her music career, penning many songs that became Thanh Lam's hits: Khát Vọng (Desire), Tình Yêu Không Lời (Wordless Love), Màu Hoa Đỏ (Color of Rose).

Thanh Lam was married to composer Quốc Trung from 1994 to 2004; the couple has two children. Her daughter, Nguyễn Thiên Thanh, is one of bright actress and composer of Youth Theatre of Vietnam. In 2012 she resigned, changed her name and moved to Singapore. April 2018 she won the best songwriter of the year in Hanoi.

== Discography includes ==
- Nếu điều đó xảy ra
- Em đi qua tôi (1990)
- Gọi tên bốn mùa
- Bài hát ru anh (1997)
- Nghe mưa (Hồng Nhung) (1997)
- Nghe mưa 2 (Hồng Nhung and Lam Trường) (2007)
- Em và tôi (1998)
- Nơi mùa thu bắt đầu (1998)
- Lá thư (1998)
- Ru đời đi nhé (1999)
- Khát vọng (2000)
- Đợi chờ (2001)
- Mây trắng bay về (2001)
- Giọt lệ tình (Hồng Nhung) (1997)
- Thiện Thanh (2002)
- Tự sự (2004)
- Thanh Lam - Hà Trần (Trần Thu Hà) (2004)
- Nắng lên (2005)
- Ru mãi ngàn năm (2005)
- Em và đêm (2005)
- Này em có nhớ (2005)
- Nợ (Hồng Nhung) (2006)
- Thanh Lam - Trọng Tấn (Trọng Tấn) (2006)
- Giọt...Lam – Thanh Lam Collection Vol 1 (2006)
- Biệt (Tùng Dương and Trần Thu Hà) (2007)
- Lam Blue 'TA' (2007)
- Lam xưa (2008)
- Nơi bình yên (2009)
- Thanh Lam Acoustic (2009)
- Sa mạc tình yêu (Đàm Vĩnh Hưng) (1997)
- Yêu (Tùng Dương) (1997)
- Nơi gặp gỡ tình yêu (2020)
