= Quốc Trung =

Vietnamese musician

Nguyễn Quốc Trung
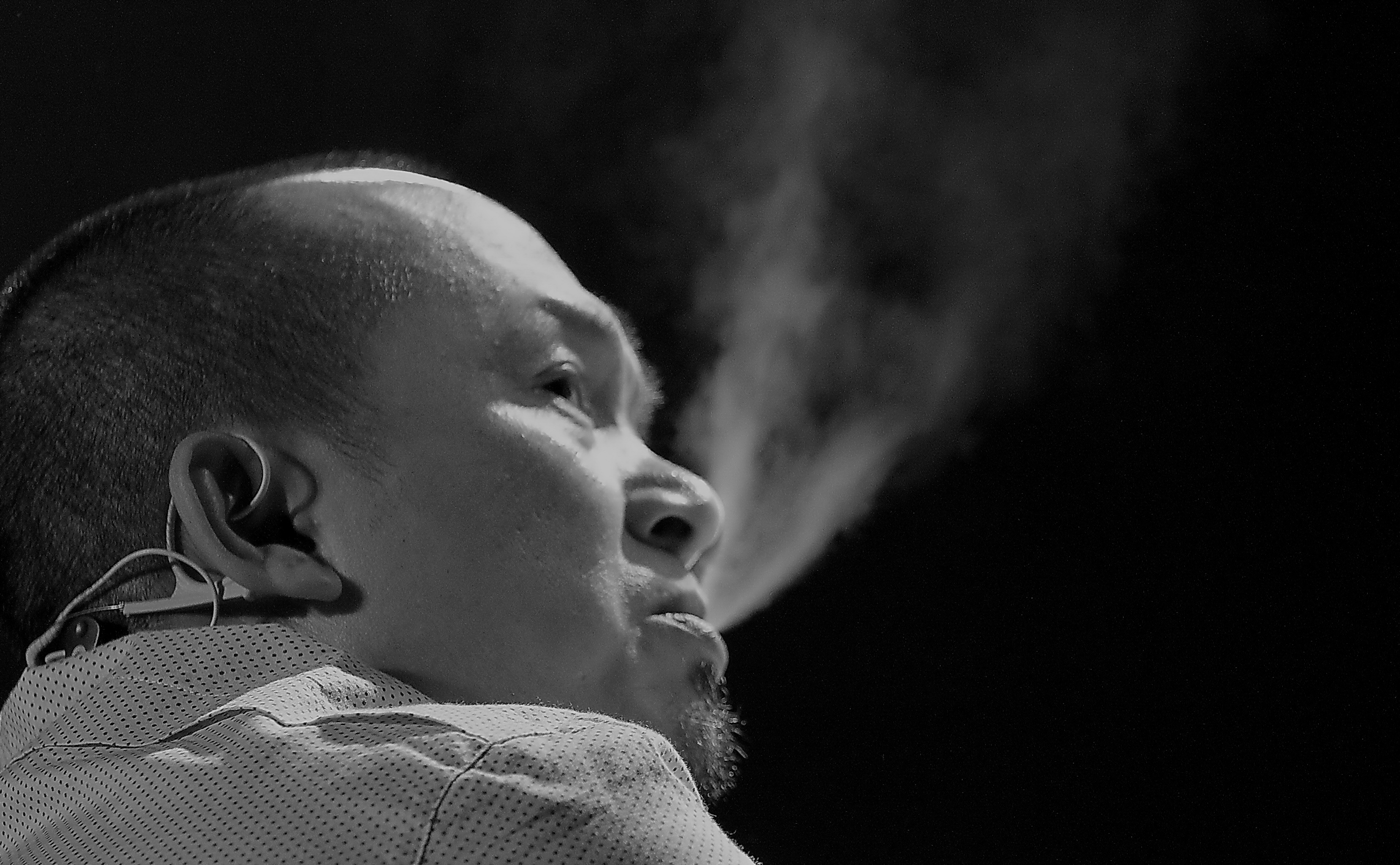
- Quoc Trung in 2012
- Education: Vietnam National Academy of Music
- Occupations: Songwriter; musician; producer; composer
- Years active: 1983–present
- Known for: Music producer; Founder of Monsoon Music Festival; President of the evaluation council of Songs of Vietnam
- Partners: Thanh Lam (1994–2004); Lê Hương Lan (2015–present)
- Children: Nguyễn Thiện Thanh; Nguyễn Đăng Quang
- Parents: Nguyễn Thanh Nga (mother); Nguyễn Trung Kiên (father)
- Musical career
- Genres: World music; Pop; New-age; Electronic music
- Instruments: Piano; Organ; Keyboard; Synthesizer
- Labels: Viết Tân Records; Dihavina; The Oriental Productions; Thanh Việt Production
- Website: Quốc Trung on Facebook

Nguyễn Quốc Trung, commonly known as Quoc Trung, is a Vietnamese composer, sound arranger, and record producer.

== Recent activities and on-going projects ==
Quoc Trung aims to push the Vietnamese music industry towards more standardized practices with intellectual property and copyright laws. In 2012, Quoc Trung was vocal about the digital intellectual property copyright issue and the distribution of music on Internet websites, which freely broadcast tracks from new albums with no regard to the artists and their copyrights in Vietnam. He stated that this is a worldwide problem for the entertainment industry and is common in Vietnam.

He has taken part in the Montreux Jazz Festival and the Roskilde Music Festival.

The Hanoi Monsoon Music Festival was a three-day event of live performances featuring Sato (France), DJ Van Cliffe (Japan), 9Bach (Wales), Benjamin Schoos (Belgium), Carpark North (Denmark), Lulu Rouge (Denmark), Dominic Miller (UK-Argentina), Yi Sung Yol (South Korea), and Vietnamese artists such as Diva Thanh Lam, Diva Trần Thu Hà, 5 Dòng Kẻ band, Ngũ Cung (Pentatonic) band, Kop Band, Rhapsody Philharmonic Group, DJ Tuấn Kruise, DJ Hoang Touliver, DJ SlimV, rapper Suboi and rapper Kimese.

Trung participated in Season 2 of The Voice of Vietnam as one of four coaches.

The Roots was a cross-cultural project in collaboration with French-Vietnamese jazz guitarist Nguyen Le. This project was officially launched with a concert, billed as Khởi Nguồn (The Roots- Beginning) on September 1, 2012, at the Hanoi Opera House. Alongside Quoc Trung and Nguyen Le, the concert featured Vietnamese pop diva Thanh Lam, traditional opera singer Kieu Anh, Tunisian musician Dhafer Youssef, and German percussion artist Rhani Krija.

Quoc Trung first appeared on the 3rd season of Vietnam Idol in 2010.

In 2011, Trung founded Thanh Viet Production, a record label and stage production company. Trung produced Uyen Linh's first album, My Own Dream (Giấc Mơ Tôi), released in February 2011.

== Influences ==
Trung is influenced by both traditional Vietnamese sounds and electronic influences of pop and folklore. Trung incorporates many Vietnamese traditional strings instruments (Dan Bau, Dan Tranh, Dan Co, etc.), which he blends with digital mixers, samplers, and current Western instruments.

== Achievements ==
Quoc Trung composed soundtrack commercials for the Sony brand. He has written music for a number of Asian feature films, and his music was played in the official ads for Vietnam Airlines.

== Collaborators ==
He has collaborated with Thanh Lam, Duong Thu, Niels Lan Doky, Nguyen Le, Martin Hedin, Dhafer Youssef, Rhani Krija, Hong Nhung, Stephan Eicher, Tùng Dương, Xavier Desandre Navarre, Bui Huy Tuan, Manu Katche, Truong Anh Quan, Bent Bitte Iversen, My Linh, Tran Thu Ha, Uyen Linh and others.

== Discography ==
- The Roots (2012)
- Vòng Tròn (2011)
- Wishing Upon the Moon (2011)
- Như cánh vạc bay (2006)
- Road to Infinity (2005)
- Khu vườn yên tĩnh (2004)
- Một ngày mới (2003)
