= Dương Thụ =

Vietnamese songwriter

- Also known as: Trần Xuân Nam; Vân Đình; Ái Nhạc
- Born: Dương Thụ; February 10, 1943 (age 83); Vân Đình, Hà Sơn Bình, Vietnam
- Occupation: Composer

Dương Thụ (Vân Đình, Ứng Hòa Hanoi, 10 February 1943) is a Vietnamese songwriter.

He has profound influence on Vietnamese music especially in the 1990's. His songs have been covered by well-known singers like Lệ Quyên (b. 1959), Thanh Lam, Mỹ Linh, Hồng Nhung, and Bằng Kiều.

His close friends - Trần Tiến, Nguyễn Cường, and Phó Đức Phương, and him formed the "Fantastic Four" of Red River, a title that reflects their contribution to contemporary music.

== Notable works ==
- Ru em bằng tiếng sóng
- Họa mi hót trong mưa
- Lắng nghe mùa xuân về
- Hơi thở mùa xuân
- Mong về Hà Nội
- Bay vào ngày xanh
- Cho em một ngày
- Đánh thức tầm xuân
- Tháng tư về
- Nghe mưa
- Vẫn hát lời tình yêu
- Em đi qua tôi
- Bóng tối ly cà phê
- Bài hát ru cho anh

== Discography ==
- Dương Thụ & Arlene Estrella (Philippines) SUN DANCE (Live Music Live Sound) [Nhạc Việt Lời Anh]
