= Dedication Music Awards =

Vietnamese award for achievements in music

Dedication Music Award
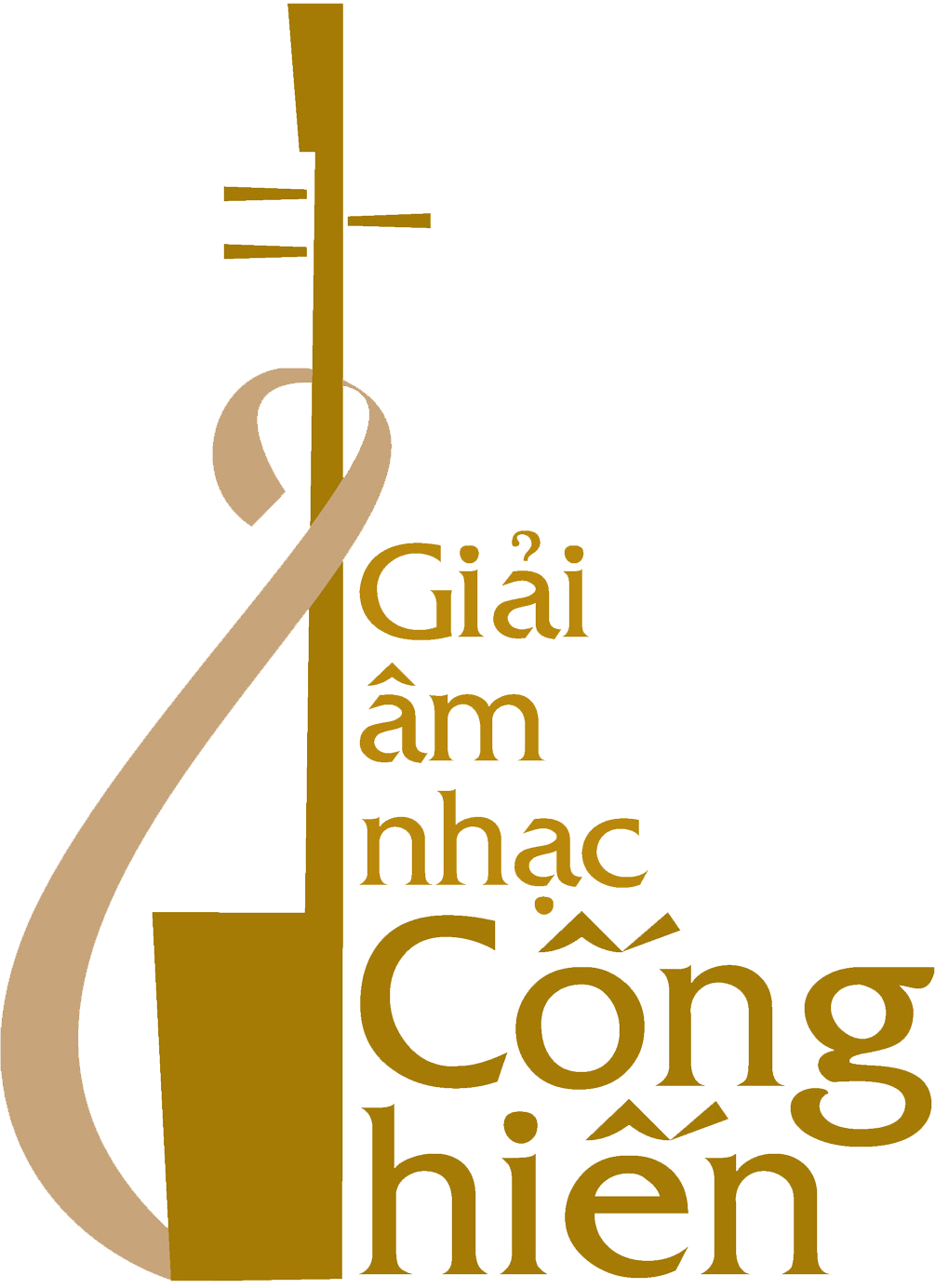
- Awarded for: The discoveries and creations contributed to the richness and development of Viet Nam pop music life.
- Country: Vietnam
- Presented by: Sports and Culture
- First award: 2005

Highlights
- Most awards: Tùng Dương
- Website: conghien.thethaovanhoa.vn

Dedication Music Awards (Vietnamese: Giải thưởng Âm nhạc Cống hiến) is an annual music award presented by Sports and Culture, a prestigious entertainment newspaper in Viet Nam, to recognize the discoveries and creations contributed to the richness and development of Viet Nam pop music. The award is considered as a "Grammy Award" in Vietnamese music. The first ceremony was held in 2005, with the original name "Pre-Dedicated Music Award".
