= Tùng Dương =

Vietnamese singer

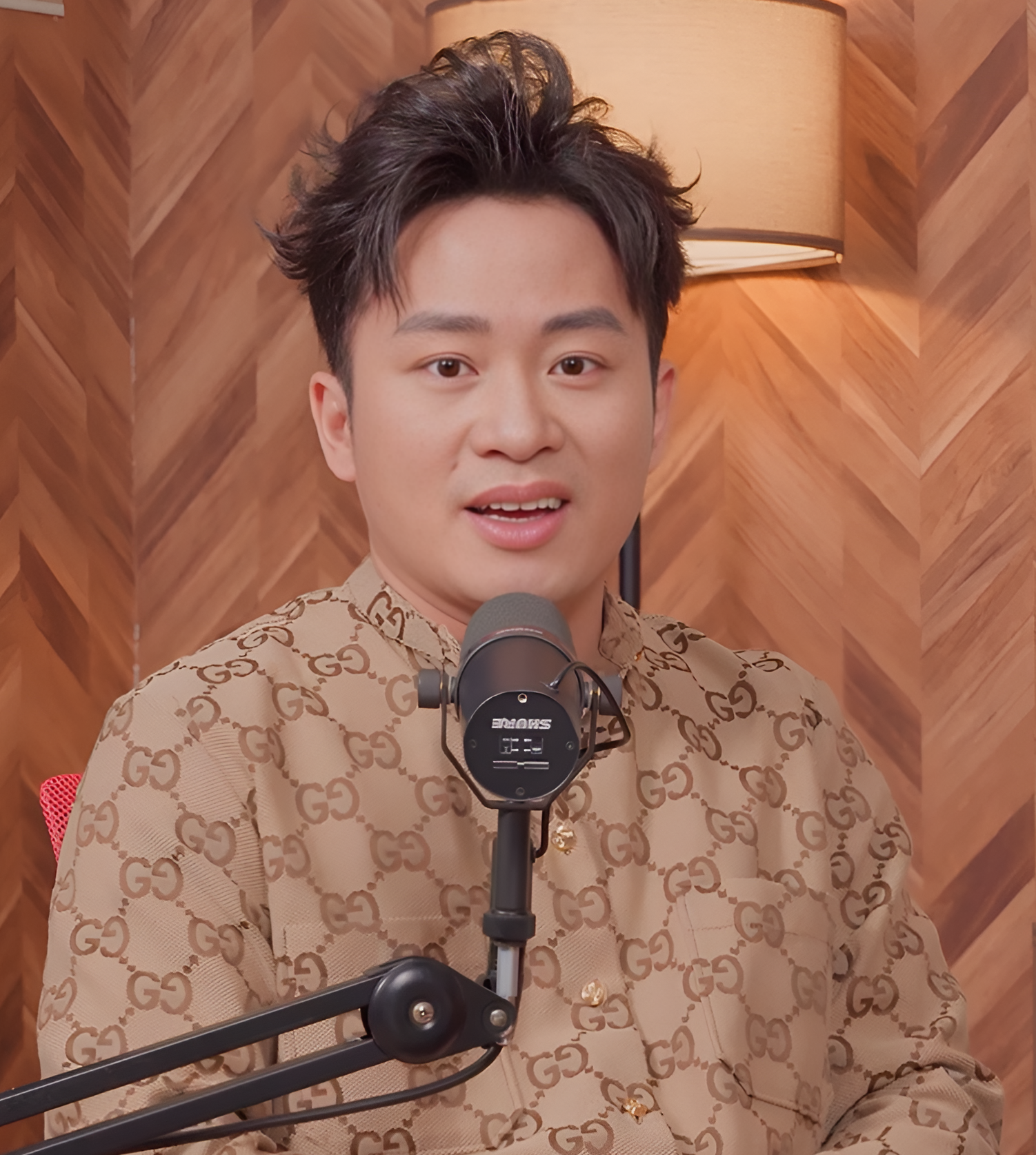
- Tùng Dương in 2024

Background information
- Also known as: Tùng Dương
- Born: Nguyễn Tùng Dương; September 18, 1983 (age 43); Hanoi, Vietnam
- Origin: Bắc Ninh
- Genres: Pop, jazz, acoustic, new-age, electronic
- Occupations: Singer, producer
- Instrument: Vocal
- Years active: 2004–present
- Label: Independent singer

Tùng Dương (birth name Nguyễn Tùng Dương, born September 18, 1983) is a Vietnamese singer. He came to fame after the 2004 music contest Sao Mai điểm hẹn, in which he won first place as ranked by the judges. Songs he performed in the contest, most of which are contemporary folk songs written by Lê Minh Sơn, were included in his first studio album called Chạy trốn (2004). After ceasing from performing Lê Minh Sơn's compositions, Tùng Dương started to sing songs by other songwriters such as Ngọc Đại, Như Huy, Giáng Son, Lưu Hà An, and performed in two music shows, Vọng Nguyệt by songwriter Quốc Trung and Gió bình minh by songwriter Đỗ Bảo.

== Biography ==
=== Early life and childhood ===
Tùng Dương was born on September 18, 1983, in Hà Nội. His father's homeland is Quảng Trị. He is the eldest child in his family. His father is a businessman, his mother was once the owner of a make-up and photo shop ~ later she became the costume designer for Tùng Dương. While his parents weren't singers, Dương had been exposed to music early in life, especially under the influence of his grandfather, songwriter Trần Hoàn. Other than that, poet Phạm Hổ and songwriter Phạm Thế Mỹ were his grandmother's younger brothers. When Tùng Dương was in grade 3, his parents went to Russia for business, and Dương was brought up by his uncles. In Russia, his parents often sent him new CDs. He had been exposed to jazz since he was very young, which helped shape his musical style later on.

In 1995, Tùng Dương received his first award, a silver medal at the 1995 Vietnam National Radio and Television Broadcast Talented Vocalist (Huy chương bạc Giọng hát hay Phát thanh Truyền hình Toàn quốc). Soon after that, when he was 12, Dương was delegated as the youngest member of Vietnam Singing and Dancing Team (Đoàn Ca múa nhạc Việt Nam) to perform in Moscow.

In 1999, Tùng Dương passed the entrance test of Hanoi Conservatory of Music (currently the Vietnam National Academy of Music), and studied under the guidance of Quang Thọ. Tùng Dương continued to win numerous awards, namely the third prize of Hanoi Music Contest for Young Singers in 1999, third prize and first prize of Hanoi Music Contest for Talented Singers in 2001 and 2003, respectively. He earned his Bachelor of Arts from the Academy in 2007.

== Career ==
=== Sao Mai Diem Hen and Chay Tran ===
In 2004, Tung Duong participated in the first Sao Mai Diem Hen contest, and became one of the 12 contestants who entered the final round with the code 04. In the contest, he mainly performed songs by musician Le Minh Son in a contemporary folk style. In the first round of the final, he was the contestant who received the most votes from the audience and continued to enter the second round. He was also the contestant who received the most compliments from the Arts Council, in which musician Tuan Khanh commented: "The modern Vietnamese youth music scene is very proud to have you in it". However, in the final night, he lost the leading position voted by the audience to Kasim Hoang Vu and became the second most voted contestant with 25% of the votes. However, he won 2 out of 3 most important awards: The award for the singer voted by the most readers of Vietnamnet newspaper, and especially, the award voted by the Arts Council, 101 received the reward of a short-term training course in performing arts abroad.

Performance night	Date	Song	Composer	Source
First	July 10, 2004	"Ôi quê tôi"	Lê Minh Sơn
Pop	July 17, 2004	"Đến bên em dịu dàng"	Lê Minh Sơn
Rock	July 24, 2004	"Lửa mắt em"	Lê Minh Sơn
Hip hop - R&B - Dance	July 31, 2004	"Hồng môi"	Lê Minh Sơn
First night of Round 2	August 15, 2004	"Trăng khát"	Lê Minh Sơn
Second night of Round 2	August 22, 2004	"Guitar cho ta" "Trăng khuyết"	Lê Minh Sơn
Third night of Round 2	August 29, 2004	"Quê nhà" "Yêu"	Trần Tiến; Lê Minh Sơn
Grand Finale	September 12, 2004	"Ôi quê tôi" "Đen và trắng"	Lê Minh Sơn; Trần Tiến

Also in July, Tung Duong released his debut album, Chay Troi, which included 7 songs by Le Minh Son, most of which he performed at Sao Mai Diem Hen, in a jazz style combined with folk music. However, Tung Duong later announced that he would temporarily stop singing Le Minh Son's music to try his hand at other musicians. In a 2007 interview, when asked about this cessation of cooperation, Tung Duong said that the relationship between the two was still very good and there was no mess. As of September 2005, the album Run Away had sold over 10,000 copies.

After Le Minh Son, Tung Duong participated in the "Sunset 2" project of musician Ngoc Dai with performances in Hai Phong (October) and Ho Chi Minh City (November). At the same time, the album Sunset 2, consisting of 7 songs by Ngoc Dai performed by him and Khanh Linh, was released at the end of December. This album, priced at 6,000 VND, achieved a sales record in recent years with 50,000 CDs printed. At the end of November, Tung Duong participated in the European Jazz Festival as the only Vietnamese singer to attend. He performed on the night of November 30 at the Cong Nhan Theater (Hanoi), in the program Vietnam Night, with a performance called "Tung Duong 3+", including compositions by Le Minh Son, Ngoc Dai, and two songs by musician Tran Minh, "Return to the Pottery Village" and "Sudden Rain". His activities in 2004 helped him receive the Singer of the Year award, part of the Tien Cong Hien award organized by the Sports & Culture newspaper (the beginning of the Cong Hien award later).

In 2005, he continued to collaborate with musician Ngoc Dai, participating in the program "Total Eclipse" in June. He also participated in the live show Khuc tu tinh 2 by musician Ha Dung with "Doi cho" and "Ben phai tinh" with ca tru and jazz influences in July. In September, Tung Duong became a guest in the performance of British singer Mara Carlyle at the Hanoi Opera House. He participated in the European Jazz Festival for the second time (the 5th time), with a music night on December 9 with the band Trong Sam (Vietnam) and Lars Storck (Denmark), in which he performed Chay tan by Le Minh Son and some classic jazz pieces. During this year, Tung Duong also planned to release an album with musician Quoc Trung and a joint album with his close friend, singer Khanh Linh, but in the end, both were not realized. He participated in the program Vietnamese Songs in April, with "Rain flying over the ancient tower", the song won the monthly round and won the award for Most Favorite Song of Vietnamese Songs in 2005.

In early 2006, Tung Duong and singer Nghi Van sang in the album Touch by musician Nhu Huy, in which he performed songs such as "Hat ru em", "Xin dung hoi toi", "Nam mo"... In June, he participated in the program Vong Nguyet by musician Quoc Trung and Niels Lan Doky, performing two nights at the Youth Theater (Hanoi) and Ho Chi Minh City Theater, and finally the program crew went to perform Vong Nguyet at the Roskilde Music Festival (Denmark) in early July. In this program, besides Quoc Trung's world music compositions in Duong xa van dam, he and senior singer Thanh Lam performed songs by Quoc Trung, Niels Lan Doky, Pho Duc Phuong... Another program that Tung Duong also participated in was Gio binh minh, a traditional folk instrument concert program by musician Do Bao that took place in late September - early October, however, he did not perform the song but took on the vocal part with Minh Anh and Minh Anh. He also performed "Sang nay" by Luu Ha An and "Chut nang vang bay" by Giang Son, two of the 18 songs that entered the 2006 Vietnamese Song Awards. At the 2006 Mai Vang Awards at the end of the year, Tung Duong received the award for Most Favorite Male Singer of Folk Songs with the song "Oh My Hometown" (Le Minh Son). The award ceremony caused a scandal when another nominated singer, Dan Truong, and his manager claimed that the results were "pre-arranged" and therefore announced that they would no longer participate in the Mai Vang awards.

=== Những ô màu khối lập phương ===
In 2007, three years after his debut album "Run Away", Tung Duong released his second album, "Những ô màu khối lập phương". The album was released in September, produced, arranged and edited by musician Do Bao. In contrast to the acoustic and contemporary folk style of the previous album, this time "Những ô màu khối lập phương" includes 8 songs by Do Bao, Luu Ha An, Tran Tien and Huyen Ngoc, performed on a New Age harmony background mixed with many different musical elements such as rock, jazz, electronic music and classical music. Talking about the content of this album, Tung Duong replied:

My second album is called "Những ô màu khối lập phương"... is a strange, abstract musical space, each color represents the fate of a person, like a Rubik's cube, not a sweet love song about love and happiness, but deep, philosophical contemplations about desire, lust, instinct.... But not heavy, gloomy, but each song is a color block, linked together...

The album received high professional reviews and sold nearly 30,000 copies after 3 years of release. With this album, Tung Duong received the 2007 Dedication Award for Album of the Year.

In 2007, in addition to releasing his second album, Tung Duong also participated in several other albums. He and two singers Le Quyen and Tuan Hiep released the album Mat Biec, including pre-war compositions and 54-75 love songs by musicians Doan Chuan, Ngo Thuy Mien, and Pham Dinh Chuong. In his first experiment with old music, Tung Duong sang three songs: "Autumn for you", "Send the wind to the thousand clouds" and "Leaves fall in many directions". He also recorded 3 songs - "Cổ và mưa", "Nến trắng" and "Chất nắng vàng bay" - in the album Giáng Son (released in July) by female musician Giáng Son, and appeared in the album Biệt by musician Trần Viết Tân with two senior singers Thanh Lam and Hà Trần. In addition, the song "Tre xanh ru" by Quốc Trung that he performed along with "Ngữ ở, người về" (Lê Minh Sơn) performed by Thanh Lam, two songs with folk melodies of the Northern Delta, were approved by the Ministry of Culture, Sports and Tourism to participate in the project on the album "Collection of ASEAN Pop Songs".

This period also marked Tung Duong's appearance on many television music programs. In the program Con duong am nhac, he appeared continuously in the programs of many musicians, such as Thuan Yen, Phu Quang, Doan Chuan - Tu Linh, Quoc Trung, Duong Thu, Pho Duc Phuong, Ngoc Chau - Do Bao... In particular, the program Bai hat Viet in 2007 had the reappearance of Tung Duong with the song "Con co" by musician Luu Ha An, the composition won the two most important awards Song of the Year and Song most loved by the audience, and also helped him receive the award for Most loved singer of the program.

2008 witnessed Tung Duong's quiet activities, apart from a tour to serve the Vietnamese community in France, Germany, the Netherlands, Hungary with the group 5 Dong Ke organized by the Department of Culture and Information of Ho Chi Minh City in June. He collaborated with other artists such as Nathan Lee, or sang a duet "Con thuyen khong ben" in the album Phut cuoi by Cao Thai Son. Tung Duong also had his first collaboration with Quoc Bao's music in the live show themed "Quoc Bao in Concert" called Tinh ca hong Live '08 which took place on July 19. Notably, this year, he participated in three author albums: Tran Tien (released in July) by Tran Tien - performed by Tran Thu Ha, in which he performed "Diep khuc tinh yeu", "Doc huyen cam" and the duet "Trang den" with Ha Tran and Hoa Tran; Time to Love - Do Bao's second album (released in September), in which he performed two songs: "Clouds" and "Backlight": and Sitting on the sunny wall, Nguyen Vinh Tien's second album (released in September), in which he recorded the song "A small grain of rice".

In 2009, Tung Duong continued to tour in many countries such as France, Germany, the US... including charity performances. At the beginning of this year, he planned to continue the album project with musician Quoc Trung as promised before, and planned for a live show at the end of the year. However, during the trip to Germany to meet with musician Nguyen Cong Phuong Nam, Tung Duong decided to put the above two plans aside to carry out an electronic music project with this musician.

Besides that, Tung Duong also participated in domestic performance programs, especially a series of live shows of authors: the song "Love Without Words" (September 26) of Thuan Yen; returned with Le Minh Son in the live show "A Section of the Red River" (October 24) in which he performed the new song "My Hanoi", the song "Falling Leaves in the Evening" (October 29) of Doan Chuan; and the live show "Sending a Love" (November 19) of Phu Quang. Tung Duong also held two of his own minishows in March in Hanoi and Ho Chi Minh City, in which, besides his familiar songs, he also performed classic jazz love songs such as "The Girl from Ipanema", "Fly Me to the Moon", "Misty", "When I Fall in Love"... In November, he was one of the artists participating in the first ever Street Art Festival held in Hanoi. He also contributed his voice to musician Minh Chau's album released in December, "The Epic of the Vietnamese People". He returned to Vietnamese Song in 2009 with "Wall Clock" by Nguyen Xinh Xo, a song that not only helped Tung Duong win the Singer award.

The artist performed effectively in the monthly competition, and also won the annual final with the top prize, Song of the Year.

=== Li ti ===
Nearly two years after embarking on the project with Nguyen Cong Phuong Nam (Vincent Nguyen), Tung Duong released his third album, Li ti, in December 2010. The album consists of eight songs, including two instrumental pieces by Nguyen Cong Phuong Nam and Sebastian Parche and 6 songs, of which 4 songs "Li ti" (the title song, composed by Sa Huynh), "Alarm Clock", "The Crane", "This Morning" won awards at the Vietnamese Song program and 2 new songs written specifically for him. This album was recorded and produced in Germany with a budget of 30,000 USD by Nguyen Cong Phuong Nam's team at Touch The Sky Productions, in the style of electronic music, with the participation of a symphony orchestra (The Beethoven Orchestra of Bonn) and a blend of folk music elements. This album won the February 2011 Gold Album award, and was one of the 3 Gold Albums of 2010 along with albums by Dam Vinh Hung and Nguyen Vu.

Another highlight of Tung Duong in 2010 was the joint live show with Thanh Lam called Love, held on January 27 and 28, 2010 at the Hanoi Grand Theatre and January 15, 2011 at the Ho Chi Minh City Theatre, along with some minishows in the following year. Love mainly consists of pre-war songs and love songs from 1954-1975 by Doan Chuan - Tu Linh, Van Phung, Cung Tien, Pham Duy..., alongside some youth music compositions by Le Minh Son and Giang Son. Besides Love, Tung Duong also participated in several other live programs, such as the second live show of jazz artist Quyen Van Minh and his friends (November 29, 2010), the Miss World Vietnam program at Vinpearl Land on August 21, and especially two contemporary art programs, Sound Bridge (February 25, 2010) and Tree of Life (October 15, 2010) by Dao Anh Khanh in the "Flow of 1000 Years" program series commemorating 1000 years of Thang Long-Hanoi.

With his activities in 2010, Tung Duong was nominated in 3 out of 4 categories of the Dedication Awards: Album of the Year (for Li ti), Program of the Year (for Yêu), and Singer of the Year.

He was a big winner at the awards ceremony, taking home both Album of the Year and Singer of the Year awards.

In early 2011, he and singer My Linh released a single online - a new version of the song "Khuc Giao Mua" (Huy Tuan) which My Linh had previously performed. In mid-April, right after the Cong Hien Awards ceremony, Tung Duong and Le Cat Trong Ly - the musician who won the Musician of the Year award - had a joint performance program called Duong & Ly, starting the Music Space project directed by Viet Tu. In May, Tung Duong once again performed with Thanh Lam and Le Minh Son in the program "Dem Giai Nhan", and performed the jazz song "Fly to the Moon" at the third live show of the Dancing with the Stars competition. He was a guest on the program "Homeland" by French-Vietnamese musician Nguyen Le on July 13 & 14 in Hanoi, where he performed "Homeland", "Spinning the Web", "Mercedes Benz" and "Redemption Song" with new jazz and world music arrangements by Nguyen Le. Also in July, Tung Duong accepted the invitation to be a judge of the National Television Singing Contest - Sao Mai Award 2011. Afterwards, he also planned a duet album with Thanh Lam conducted by conductor Le Phi Phi, and an album of old songs called "Love Song No. 1".

== Artistry ==
Tung Duong's voice and style are heavily influenced by stars like Thanh Lam, Whitney Houston, Peter Gabriel, Björk... He also loves and is greatly influenced by jazz, although Tung Duong's experimentation with jazz is still not much.

Tung Duong has a Full Lirico Tenor voice, with a dark, thick, spongy, and powerful tone. Tung Duong doesn't confine himself to one genre but pursues many different musical genres, such as jazz, pop, contemporary folk (like "Running Away," "The Crane"), New Age (Cubes of Color), electronic (Li Ti), world music, and even revolutionary music and old music (lyric music before 1975).

At the same time, Tung Duong also believes that this helps him expand his audience. He admits that the music genre he pursues "does not have high popularity," so he always follows two paths. One is to explore and experiment in contemporary music, while also performing more accessible pop songs to reach the public.

Besides his work as a singer, Tung Duong also tried his hand at songwriting. He released a song called "In the Arms of Loneliness" which was performed by Thai Thuy Linh in the Sao Mai Rendezvous album.

=== Fashion ===
Tung Duong considers himself a "fashionista," and often carefully chooses his outfits whenever he goes on stage. He is considered one of the artists with a unique and impressive sense of style. However, Tung Duong's unconventional fashion sense has also caused controversy, and when asked about this, he said that "my music and fashion are too new."

In Vietnam, his costumes are often custom-designed and have changed in style over time. During the period when he sang contemporary folk music, he often performed in costumes made of silk and brocade, with many stylized ethnic patterns, designed by his mother and Van Thanh Cong. Later, when his musical genre expanded, he often appeared in more impressive and modern costumes, which he commissioned from designers Cong Tri and Do Manh Cuong.

He was one of the guest artists who participated in the Dep Fashion Show 5 titled "Mystery of the Soul" in April 2007.

== Personal life ==
Due to his "picky" fashion and music style, Tung Duong also had to endure criticism from a segment of the audience, considering his style "eccentric", "ghostly", In addition, after the Vietnam Idol 2010 contest ended, when answering an interview about the winner Uyen Linh, he commented that he had not found a "musical personality" in Uyen Linh and therefore did not feel "really interested" in her. This comment by Tung Duong caused him to be harshly criticized by many of Uyen Linh's fans. In another interview, Tung Duong said that he felt sad and offended by these criticisms.

It was also Tung Duong's performance style and costumes that raised suspicions about his sexual orientation, however he denied that he was "gay". At the end of 2006, he revealed his current girlfriend, a young poet born in 1987, who was studying abroad in France. These revelations led public opinion to believe that the girlfriend he was referring to was poet Truong Que Chi. However, both Tung Duong and Truong Que Chi denied this information. In 2010, he announced that his relationship with his girlfriend studying abroad had broken up. During a concert celebrating more than 10 years of singing in Hanoi in December 2015, Tung Duong announced his first son, who was born two days ago.

On the other hand, in the professional circle, Tung Duong has good relationships with many female artists, such as Thanh Lam, Ngoc Khue, Khanh Linh, Thu Phuong, poet Vi Thuy Linh... He is also known for his feisty personality, which was put into the soundtrack of the movie *Kiss of Death*: "As long as there are more builders than destroyers. And as long as Tung Duong stops being feisty..."

Besides his singing career, Tung Duong also runs a restaurant and a souvenir shop on Cha Ca Street, Hanoi. In his free time, he often spends time listening to music, reading books, writing blogs and drawing.

== Awards ==
Year	Award	Category	Nominee	Result
1995	National Radio and Television Singing Contest		Tùng Dương	Silver Medal
1999	Hanoi Youth Singing Contest		Tùng Dương	Third Prize
2001	Hanoi Singing Contest		Tùng Dương	Third Prize
2003	Hanoi Singing Contest		Tùng Dương	First Prize
2004	Sao Mai điểm hẹn	Art Council's Choice Award	Tùng Dương	Won
2005	Pre-Dedication Award	Singer of the Year	Tùng Dương	Won
2005	Pre-Dedication Award	Album of the Year	Chạy trốn (Escape)	Nominated
2005	VTV – The Songs I Love (3rd Edition)	Art Council's Award	Cuối đêm (End of Night)	Won
2006	Mai Vang Awards	Most Popular Male Folk-Inspired Singer	Tùng Dương	Won
2007	Bai Hat Viet (Vietnamese Song)	Most Popular Singer	Tùng Dương	Won
2008	Dedication Music Awards	Album of the Year	Những ô màu khối lập phương (The Colored Cubes)	Won
2009	Dedication Music Awards	Album of the Year	Trần Tiến	Nominated
2011	Dedication Music Awards	Album of the Year	Li ti (Tiny)	Won
2011	Dedication Music Awards	Singer of the Year	Tùng Dương	Won
2011	Dedication Music Awards	Show of the Year	Yêu (Love) Liveshow	Nominated
2011	Golden Album 2010	Golden Album of February	Li ti (Tiny)	Won
2011	Golden Album 2010	Golden Album of the Year 2010	Li ti (Tiny)	Won
2012	Dedication Music Awards	Show of the Year	Những chuyến đi (The Journeys) Liveshow	Nominated
2012	Dedication Music Awards	Singer of the Year	Tùng Dương	Won
2013	Dedication Music Awards	Singer of the Year	Tùng Dương	Nominated
2013	Favorite Song	Song of the Year	"Chiếc khăn piêu" (The Pieu Shawl)	Won
2013	Dedication Music Awards	Song of the Year	"Chiếc khăn piêu" (The Pieu Shawl)	Won
2014	Dedication Music Awards	Show of the Year	Độc đạo (The Only Path) Liveshow	Won
2014	Dedication Music Awards	Album of the Year	Độc đạo (The Only Path)	Nominated
2014	Dedication Music Awards	Singer of the Year	Tùng Dương	Won
2015	Dedication Music Awards	Singer of the Year	Tùng Dương	Nominated
2016	Dedication Music Awards	Singer of the Year	Tùng Dương	Nominated
2016	Dedication Music Awards	Album of the Year	Bóng tối Jazz (The Shadow of Jazz)	Won
2016	Dedication Music Awards	Show of the Year	Thập kỷ hoan ca (A Decade of Joyful Songs) Liveshow	Won
2018	Dedication Music Awards	Show of the Year	Trời và đất (Heaven and Earth) Liveshow	Nominated
2018	Dedication Music Awards	Singer of the Year	Tùng Dương	Nominated
2019	Dedication Music Awards	Singer of the Year	Tùng Dương	Nominated
2019	Dedication Music Awards	Show of the Year	Tùng Dương sings the Red River Quartet Liveshow	Nominated
2021	Dedication Music Awards	Show of the Year	Human Liveshow	Won
2021	Dedication Music Awards	Album of the Year	Human	Won
2021	Dedication Music Awards	Song of the Year	"Cơn mưa tháng 5" (May Rain)	Nominated
2021	Dedication Music Awards	Singer of the Year	Tùng Dương	Won
2022	Male Icon Awards	Music Artist of the Year	Tùng Dương	Won
2023	Dedication Music Awards	Male Singer of the Year	Tùng Dương	Won
2023	Dedication Music Awards	Show of the Year	20th Anniversary of Singing Liveshow	Nominated
2024	Male Icon Awards	Lifetime Artist of the Year	Tùng Dương	Won
2024	Vietnam Music Awards	Best Singer	Tùng Dương	Sol Vang
2025	Dedication Music Awards	Album of the Year	Multiverse	Nominated
2025	Dedication Music Awards	Show of the Year	Người đàn ông hát (The Singing Man) Liveshow	Nominated
2025	Dedication Music Awards	Song of the Year	"Tái sinh" (Rebirth)	Won
2025	Dedication Music Awards	Male Singer of the Year	Tùng Dương	Nominated
2025	Japan Music Awards	Special Award: Vietnamese Popular Music	"Tái sinh" (Rebirth)	Won
2025	Luxuo Asia Awards	Most Inspiring Person of the Year (Male)	Tùng Dương	Won
2025	Dep Awards	Outstanding Collaboration	Tùng Dương and Nguyễn Văn Chung	Won
2025	Mai Vang Awards	Male Singer	Tùng Dương	Nominated
2025	Mai Vang Awards	Music Video	"Việt Nam tự hào tiếp bước tương lai" (Vietnam Proudly Steps into the Future)	Nominated
2025	Mai Vang Awards	Singer of the Year	Tùng Dương	Won
2025	Lan Song Xanh	Male Singer/Rapper of the Year	Tùng Dương	Nominated
2025	Lan Song Xanh	Breakthrough Singer	Tùng Dương	Nominated
2025	Lan Song Xanh	Phenomenal Song	"Tái sinh" (Rebirth)	Nominated
2025	Lan Song Xanh	Top 10 Favorite Songs	"Tái sinh" (Rebirth)	Won
2025	Lan Song Xanh	Most Popular Male Singer/Rapper	Tùng Dương	Nominated
2025	Lan Song Xanh	Special Award	"Viết tiếp câu chuyện hòa bình" (Write in the Story of Peace)	Won
