= Phú Quang =

Vietnamese composer (1949–2021)

- Born: Nguyễn Phú Quang; 13 October 1949; Phú Thọ, Phú Thọ Province, North Vietnam
- Origin: Hanoi, Vietnam
- Died: 8 December 2021 (aged 72) Hanoi, Vietnam
- Occupation: Composer

Nguyễn Phú Quang (13 October 1949 – 8 December 2021), known popularly simply as Phú Quang, was an influential Vietnamese composer, primarily known for his love songs and songs about Hanoi. He also wrote symphonies and concertos, as well as film scores and soundtracks.

== Biography ==
Nguyễn Phú Quang was born on 13 October 1949 in Phú Thọ as his family was evacuating during the First Indochina War. The family returned to Vinh Loc, Phung Xa, Thach That, Hanoi in 1954. In 1985, he moved to Ho Chi Minh City, but frequently returned to Hanoi, which was of great music inspiration. He resided in Hanoi with his family and ran a restaurant.

He had three children. One of his children, Trinh Huong, is an accomplished pianist. Her husband, Bui Cong Duy, is a well-known Vietnamese violinist.

Quang died in Hanoi on 8 December 2021, at the age of 72 due to complications from diabetes.

== Works ==
=== Music albums ===
- Về Lại Phố Xưa
- Mười Ba Chuyện Bình Thường
- Dòng Sông Không Trở Lại
- Cho Một Người Tình Xa
- Một Dại Khờ, Một Tôi
- Trong Ánh Chớp Số Phận
- Phố Cũ Của Tôi
- Tôi Muốn Mang Hồ Gươm Đi
- Cha và Con - with pianist Trinh Huong
- The Best of Phu Quang - Gửi một tình yêu

=== Notable songs ===
- Hà Nội ngày trở về
- Em ơi Hà Nội phố
- Đâu phải bởi mùa thu
- Khúc mùa thu
- Im lặng đêm Hà Nội
- Mơ về nơi xa lắm
- Có Một Ngày
- Trong Ánh Chớp Số Phận
