= The Voice Kids of Vietnam =

Vietnamese TV series or program

- Vietnamese: Giọng hát Việt nhí
- Genre: Reality television
- Created by: John de Mol
- Presented by: Trấn Thành & Thanh Thảo; Thanh Bạch; Jennifer Phạm; Thanh Duy; Hoàng Oanh; Ngô Kiến Huy & Chi Pu; Thành Trung; Quỳnh Chi; Phí Linh; Ali Hoàng Dương; Gil Lê; Khả Ngân; Nguyên Khang
- Judges: Thanh Bùi; Hồ Hoài Anh & Lưu Hương Giang; Hiền Thục; Lam Trường; Cẩm Ly; Dương Khắc Linh; Noo Phước Thịnh; Đông Nhi & Ông Cao Thắng; Vũ Cát Tường; Hương Tràm & Tiên Cookie; Soobin Hoàng Sơn; Khắc Hưng & Bảo Anh; Phạm Quỳnh Anh; Ali Hoàng Dương & Lưu Thiên Hương; Dương Cầm & Hương Giang Idol; Hưng Cao; BigDaddy & Emily
- Country of origin: Vietnam
- Original language: Vietnamese
- No. of series: 8
- No. of episodes: 104

Production
- Production location: Ho Chi Minh City
- Running time: About 60-120 mins
- Production company: Cát Tiên Sa

Original release
- Network: Vietnam Television
- Release: June 1, 2013 – April 25, 2021

Related
- The Voice of Vietnam; The Voice Kids (Dutch TV series)

The Voice Kids of Vietnam (Vietnamese: Giọng hát Việt nhí) is a reality television singing competition for children from 6 to 14 years old (9 to 14 years old from 2013 to 2016), based on the concept of The Voice Kids of Holland. It premiered in Vietnam on June 1, 2013, on Vietnam Television (VTV3).

== Timeline ==
Coaches	Seasons									
Coaches	1 (2013)	2 (2014)	3 (2015)	4 (2016)	5 (2017)	6 (2018)	7 (2019)	8 (2021)	9 (2023)	10 (2026)
Presenter
Trấn Thành										
Thanh Thảo										
Thanh Bạch										
Jennifer Pham										
Thanh Duy										
Hoàng Oanh										
Ngô Kiến Huy										
Chi Pu										

== Coaches and hosts ==
After the success of the first season of The Voice, Cat Tien Sa announced that they would produce The Voice Kids, where 6-15 year-olds compete against each other. The first season was premiere on the Children's Day in Vietnam, June 1, 2013. The presenters are Trấn Thành and Thanh Thảo. The coaches are three instead of four: the husband-and-wife duo Hồ Hoài Anh and Lưu Hương Giang, Hiền Thục and Thanh Bùi.

For season 2 in 2014, Hồ Hoài Anh & Lưu Hương Giang returned along with two new coaches, Cẩm Ly and Lam Trường. New presenters were Thanh Bạch and Jennifer Phạm. For the third season premiered in July 2015, The X Factor Vietnam judge Dương Khắc Linh replaced Lam Trường, while the duo Giang Hồ and singer Cẩm Ly remained.

After season 3 finale, it was announced that the duo Giang Hồ would leave the show because of Lưu Hương Giang's pregnancy. Hồ Hoài Anh then moved to become the show's music executive. As Cẩm Ly also stated not to return either, Cat Tien Sa decided to refresh the judging panel with younger singers in Vietnam. Đông Nhi & Ông Cao Thắng were the first coaches confirmed for season 4. Noo Phước Thịnh came on board in early April. Even though rumors stated that the fourth coach would be Sơn Tùng M-TP, on June 6, 2016, it was officially confirmed that The Voice of Vietnam season 2 runner-up Vũ Cát Tường would become a coach.

On May 28, 2017, in an interview, Soobin Hoàng Sơn revealed that he has signed to become a coach for The Voice Kids season 5. On June 11, 2017, Vũ Cát Tường announced her return to the show. On June 26, 2017, the double chair was revealed to be composed of Hương Tràm, The Voice season 1 winner; and musician Tiên Cookie. Actor and comedian Thành Trung joined the show as host for season 5.

On July 12, 2018, the show's producers announced that all coaches for season 6 would be duos, and that former coaches Hồ Hoài Anh and Lưu Hương Giang would return for the sixth season. A week later, Vũ Cát Tường confirmed to be returning to the show for her third year. The following day, Soobin Hoàng Sơn also confirmed to be returning, while former The Voice season 1 contestant Bảo Anh was announced as a new coach. On July 31, music producer Khắc Hưng was announced as the new sixth coach for the sixth season. On the taping day at August 2, 2018, it was revealed that the two new coaches would form a new duo coach, whereas Soobin and Vũ Cát Tường would combine as a duo coach. The Voice season 4 winner Ali Hoàng Dương appointed as the new host for season 6. This season marks the first time in any version of The Voice worldwide to have three different duo coaches, and the second time that the judging panel consists of six coaches, following the Belgian-Flemish version.

On June 12, 2019, three new duo coaches were announced for season 7 as: musician Dương Cầm & 2018 Miss International Queen Hương Giang, Ali Hoàng Dương & Lưu Thiên Hương, and Dương Khắc Linh & Phạm Quỳnh Anh; while Hồ Hoài Anh would once again become the music executive. A reimagined eighth season premiered in January 2021 with BigDaddy & Emily, Hưng Cao & Vũ Cát Tường and Hồ Hoài Anh & Lưu Hương Giang as three duo coaches.

=== Season summary ===
Team Hồ Hoài Anh & Lưu Hương Giang
Team Thanh Bùi
Team Hiền Thục
Team Cẩm Ly
Team Soobin Hoàng Sơn & Vũ Cát Tường
Team Dương Cầm & Hương Giang Idol

Team Lam Trường
Team Dương Khắc Linh
Team Noo Phước Thịnh
Team Đông Nhi & Ông Cao Thắng
Team Ali Hoàng Dương & Lưu Thiên Hương
Team BigDaddy & Emily

Team Vũ Cát Tường
Team Soobin Hoàng Sơn
Team Hương Tràm & Tiên Cookie
Team Khắc Hưng & Bảo Anh
Team Dương Khắc Linh & Phạm Quỳnh Anh
Team Hưng Cao & Vũ Cát Tường

Season	Premiere	Finale	Winner	Runner-up	Third place	Fourth Place		Winning coach	Host(s)		Coaches (order)		
Season	Premiere	Finale	Winner	Runner-up	Third place	Fourth Place		Winning coach	Host(s)		1	2	3
1	June 1, 2013	September 7, 2013	Nguyễn Quang Anh	Phương Mỹ Chi	Trần Ngọc Duy	No fourth finalist		Hồ Hoài & Lưu Hương	Trấn Thành	Thanh Thảo	Hiền Thục	Hồ Hoài & Lưu Hương	Thanh Bùi
2	June 21, 2014	October 4, 2014	Nguyễn Thiện Nhân	Nguyễn Hoàng Anh	Trần Kayon Thiên Nhâm	No fourth finalist		Cẩm Ly	Thanh Bạch	Jennifer Pham & Thanh Duy	Cẩm Ly	Hồ Hoài & Lưu Hương	Lam Trường
3	July 1, 2015	October 24, 2015	Trịnh Nguyễn Hồng Minh	Nguyễn Công Quốc	Nguyễn Trọng Tiến Quang	No fourth finalist		Hồ Hoài & Lưu Hương	Thanh Bạch	Hoàng Oanh	Cẩm Ly	Hồ Hoài & Lưu Hương	Dương Khắc Linh
4	July 23, 2016	October 29, 2016	Trịnh Nhật Minh	Đào Nguyên Thụy Bình	Nguyễn Hoàng Mai Anh	Milana Zavolokina		Đông Nhi & Ông Cao Thắng	Ngô Kiến Huy	Chi Pu	Noo Phước Thịnh	Đông Nhi & Ông Cao Thắng	Vũ Cát Tường
5	August 12, 2017	November 25, 2017	Dương Ngọc Ánh	Đỗ Thị Hoài Ngọc	Lê Châu Như Ngọc	No fourth finalist		Vũ Cát Tường	Thành Trung	Quỳnh Chi	Soobin Hoàng Sơn	Hương Tràm & Tiên Cookie	Vũ Cát Tường
6	September 8, 2018	December 29, 2018	Hà Quỳnh Như	Đào Đình Anh Tuấn	Nguyễn Minh Chiến	Nguyễn Trần Xuân Phương		Hồ Hoài & Lưu Hương	Phí Linh	Ali Hoàng Dương; Vannie	Soobin Hoàng & Vũ Cát	Hồ Hoài & Lưu Hương	Khắc Hưng & Bảo Anh
7	July 20, 2019	October 26, 2019	Kiều Minh Tâm	Nguyễn Đoàn Chấn Quốc	Vũ Linh Đan	Nguyễn Ngọc Bảo Hân	Nguyễn Đỗ Khánh An	Ali & Lưu	Gil Lê	Khả Ngân; Nguyên Khang	Dương & Hương	Ali & Lưu	Dương & Phạm
8	January 3, 2021	April 25, 2021	Lê Đăng Bách	Lê Song Tùng	Trần Thị Thùy Trang	Nguyễn Hà Anh		Hưng Cao & Vũ Cát Tường	Gil Lê	Thành Trung	BigDaddy & Emily	Hưng Cao & Vũ Cát	Hồ Hoài & Lưu Hương
