= Dancing with the Stars Vietnam season 7 =

The seventh season of the Vietnamese television dance competition program Bước nhảy hoàn vũ featured Khánh My, Trang Pháp, Jennifer Phạm, S.T Sơn Thạch, Vũ Ngọc Anh, MLee, Lâm Khánh Chi, Hồng Quế, Khả Ngân, Thuận Nguyễn, Minh Trung and Diệu Nhi.

After this season, the show didn't return until 2024.

== Couples ==
Celebrity	Notability (known for)	Professional partner	Team	Status
Thuận Nguyễn	Actress	Viktoriya Gencheva	Trần Ly Ly	Eliminated 1st on February 27, 2016
Trang Pháp	Singer	Dorbi Petrov	Chí Anh	Withdrew on March 5, 2016
Minh Trung	Model	Daniela Nicheva	Trần Ly Ly	Eliminated 2nd on March 12, 2016
Vũ Ngọc Anh	Model & Actress	Georgi Dimov	Khánh Thi	Eliminated 3rd on March 12, 2016
Lâm Khánh Chi	Singer	Svetoslav Vasilev	Hồng Việt	Withdrew on March 19, 2016
Diệu Nhi	Actress	Mikolay	Chí Anh	Eliminated 6th on March 19, 2016
Khả Ngân	Actress	Zhivko Ivanov	Chí Anh	Eliminated 7th on March 26, 2016
MLee	Singer	Kiril Dimov	Khánh Thi	Eliminated 8th on April 2, 2016
Hồng Quế	Model	Kristian Yordanov	Trần Ly Ly	Withdrew on April 9, 2016
Jennifer Phạm	Model	Teodor Georgiev	Hồng Việt	Third place on April 16, 2016
Khánh My	Model	Georgi Ganev	Hồng Việt	Runner-up on April 16, 2016
S.T Sơn Thạch	Singer	Vyara Klisurska	Khánh Thi	Winner on April 16, 2016

== Scoring charts ==
Couple	Place	1	2	3	4	5	6	7	8
Jennifer Phạm & Teodor (01)	participating	37.5	TBA	37.5	37.5	38	39	TBA	
Khánh My & Georgi (02)	participating	36.5	TBA	39	39	36	38	TBA	
Lâm Khánh Chi & Svetoslav (03)	8th	35	TBA	35.5					
Diệu Nhi & Nikolay (04)	7th	TBA	36	37.5	36.5				
Khả Ngân & Zhivkp (05)	6th	TBA	37.5	39	39.5	36			
Trang Pháp & Vasil (06)	11th	TBA							
Hồng Quế & Kristian (07)	4th	36.5	TBA	38	37.5	37	38.5		
Thuận Nguyễn & Vicky (08)	12th	37.5							
Minh Trung & Daniela (09)	9th	36.5	TBA	35					
MLee & Kiril (10)	5th	TBA	36.5	37	38	39	39		
S.T Sơn Thạch & Vyara (11)	participating	TBA	38	36.5	39	39	40	TBA	
Vũ Ngọc Anh & Dimov (12)	9th	TBA	35.5	37		38			
Liveshow 1: 1st Latin night
Couples	Voting number	Style	Music	Score	#	Voting #	Total	Result	
Jennifer Phạm & Teodor	01	Rumba - Paso Doble	Gặp mẹ trong mơ - Đặng Thùy Trâm ơi!	37.5	6	2	8	Safe	
Khánh My & Georgi	02	Rumba - Paso Doble	Unstoppable - Cursed by beauty	36.5	4	4	8	Safe	
Lâm Khánh Chi & Svetoslav	03	Rumba - Cha cha cha	Let it go - Wake me up	35.5	1	6	7	Safe	
Hồng Quế & Kristian	07	Rumba - Contemporary	Holding hands	36.5	4	5	9	Safe	
Thuận Nguyễn - Vicky	08	Jive - Paso Doble - Rumba	He's a pirate - Unchained melody	37.5	6	1	7	Eliminated	
Minh Trung & Daniela	09	Paso Doble - Rumba	Can you feel the love tonight - The burning bridge	36.5	4	3	7	Safe	
