= VCT Tour 2019 =

2019 concert tour by Vũ Cát Tường (VCT)

- Tour by Vũ Cát Tường
- Location: Hanoi; Ho Chi Minh City
- Associated album: Inner Me
- Start date: August 31, 2019
- End date: December 15, 2019
- No. of shows: 2
- Supporting acts: Diva Hồng Nhung; Phương Uyên; Anh Tuấn The Voice Kids; Ngọc Ánh The Voice Kids
- Attendance: 6,000
- Box office: 9 billion VND (estimated)

Vũ Cát Tường concert chronology
- Stardom concert (2018); VCT Tour (2019)

VCT Tour 2019 is the first concert tour by Vietnamese singer-songwriter Vũ Cát Tường (VCT). The tour started on August 31, 2019, in Hanoi and ended on December 15, 2019, in Ho Chi Minh City.

Throughout the tour, each concert has a different vibe, style, visual effect and emotions. The tour brought unforgettable moments for the attendees.

== Release context ==
After 2 concerts – "Birthday concert" (2017) and "Stardom concert" (2018), on June 1, 2019, Vũ Cát Tường announced the tour by posted the official poster on Instagram and immediately attracted many fans and audiences about her first concert tour in music career. Then, the first destination was revealed – Hanoi.

== Concerts details and content ==
There were 2 concerts in the tour. Happened in Hanoi and Ho Chi Minh City.

Date	Concert	Location
August 31, 2019	"Dear Hanoi,"	Vietnam-XoViet friendship cultural theater, Hanoi
December 15, 2019	"Inner Me"	Quan khu 7 indoor stadium, Ho Chi Minh City

=== Dear Hanoi, concert ===
This is VCT's first concert in Hanoi. With the inspiration from The Little Prince – an iconic image that has same character with Vũ Cát Tường. The stage had a small asteroid model – symbolized for the place VCT live and enjoy her own life. Throughout the concert, Vũ Cát Tường has invited the fans to visit her asteroid through songs with chilling, soft and romantic melodies.

"If the first songs I performed are the key to open my little house, then the next songs will lead you to my bedroom, where the deepest and most private things are going to reveal"

– Vũ Cát Tường

In the concert, she also invited Hồng Nhung – VCT's judge and couch when she was in The Voice Vietnam, 2013. Two of her contestants that Tường taught in The Voice Kids: Ngọc Ánh and Anh Tuấn.

The concert offered audiences an insight into Vũ Cát Tường's artistic world, reflecting on the challenges she has faced throughout her career. Attendees gained a deeper understanding of her musical journey and the experiences that have shaped her work.

=== Inner Me concert ===
On November 9, 2019, the ticket website of Inner Me concert opened. After released the album Inner Me – recorded in Hollywood, US, Inner Me concert is the first promoting show for the album.

The Inner Me concert is the first concert in Vietnam using infinity LED stage effect, include movement sensors and Lazer. In the concert, Vũ Cát Tường performed 21 song, included 8 first-live songs in the new album. When the concert began, some 5,000 people crowded, and in the first performance – Leader, VCT appeared on a giant Cheetah model, showed that she is a brave, hard working and confident artist. The 4 side stage helped all the audiences to enjoy both visual effects and sounds.

" Today, in this Inner Me concert, you guys will see a prichly, full of ambitions, brave Vũ Cát Tường, and full of wounds too."

– Vũ Cát Tường

== Songs list ==
The songs below are from both "Dear Hanoi" and "Inner Me" concerts.

- Em ơi (Dear babe)
- Buổi sáng bình thường (Typical morning)
- Vài phút trước (Last minute)
- San Francisco
- Ngày hôm qua (Can't get enough)
- Tôi (Myself)
- Cô gái ngày hôm qua (The girl from yesterday)
- Be A Fool
- Stardom
- Don't you go
- Tôi xưa nay Hà Nội (The old and current me in Hanoi)
- Đông (Winter)
- If
- Vết mưa (Rainy)
- Yêu xa (Long-distance love)
- Nobody
- One Second
- Leader
- The Party Song
- Có Người (Someone)
- Dõi Theo (Watching you from afar)
- Hỏi thăm (How Are You)
- Gió (Wind)
- The Old You
- Ticket For Two
- Yours
- Forever Mine

== Accolades ==
After the success of Inner Me album and concert, Vũ Cát Tường appeared on International artist page of Billboard America, and received many compliments from Billboard, audiences and experts, media newsletters too.

"She spent more time and effort than ever before to create the album, because she wanted to take the first step to reach an international audience with good songs that she wrote herself, that would get the attention of this new audience and hopefully start to build a new fanbase outside Vietnam."

– Billboard USA

== Production crew and Partners ==
=== Dear Hanoi, concert ===
Production crew

- Composer: Vũ Cát Tường
- Mix and master: Vũ Cát Tường, Nguyen Thanh Binh
- Production director: Vo Do Minh Hoang
- Stage director: Cao Trung Hieu
- Band: Mau Nuoc
- Production team: The Little Prince Entertainment, Viet Vision.

Partners & Sponsors

- V Live
- Levi's
- Skechers
- Yamaha
- Viet Vision
- Dinogo
- VinID

=== Inner Me concert ===
Production team

- Composer: Vũ Cát Tường
- Mix and master: Vũ Cát Tường, Nguyen Thanh Binh
- Stage director: Nguyen Huu Thanh
- Production team: The Little Prince Entertainment, Box
- Dancers: OH Dance Crew
- Band: Potato
- Chorus team: Cadillac

Partners and sponsors

- Levi's
- V Live
- Skechers
- Box
- Cat Tien Sa
- VinID
