= The Voice Kids of Vietnam season 5 =

The Voice Kids of Vietnam
- Season 5
- Hosted by: Thành Trung; Quỳnh Chi (backstage)
- Judges: Vũ Cát Tường; Soobin Hoàng Sơn; Hương Tràm; Tiên Cookie
- Winner: Dương Ngọc Ánh
- Winning coach: Vũ Cát Tường
- Runners-up: Lê Châu Như Ngọc; Đỗ Thị Hoài Ngọc

Release
- Original network: VTV3
- Original release: August 12 – November 25, 2017

Season chronology
- ← Previous; Season 4 Next → Season 6

The fifth season of The Voice Kids of Vietnam- Giọng hát Việt nhí began on 12 August 2017 on VTV3. Vũ Cát Tường returned for her second season as a coach, while Noo Phước Thịnh, Đông Nhi and Ông Cao Thắng were replaced by singers Soobin Hoàng Sơn, Hương Tràm (The Voice season 1 winner), and Tiên Cookie, respectively.

This season was won by Dương Ngọc Ánh, an 11-year-old girl from Bắc Giang, mentored by Vũ Cát Tường, marking Vũ Cát Tường's first win as a coach after two seasons coaching on The Voice Kids.

== Coaches and hosts ==
The coaching panel had three changes from season four. After joining the adult version earlier in 2017, it was speculated that both Noo Phước Thịnh and Đông Nhi would not be returning to The Voice Kids for the fifth season. Continue with the success from the judging panel in 2016, young and famous Vietnamese singers were rumoured to be joining the show, which included Soobin Hoàng Sơn, Vietnamese hitmaker Sơn Tùng M-TP, The X Factor Vietnam winner Giang Hồng Ngọc, Tiên Tiên, Minh Hằng and The Voice season 1 winner Hương Tràm. On May 28, 2017, in an interview, Soobin Hoàng Sơn confirmed that he would become a coach for The Voice Kids season 5. Bảo Thy, The Remix 2017 winner, revealed that she was approached by Cat Tien Sa, but she turned the chance down, saying it "was not the right time". Vũ Cát Tường announced her return to the show as a coach on June 11. On June 26, 2017, the double chair was revealed to be composed of Hương Tràm, and musician Tiên Cookie. Different from the history of the show's double chair, which is usually composed of duos or couples, this is the first time that Hương Tràm and Tiên Cookie collaborate with each other.

On the filming day, comedian Thành Trung was revealed to become the show's new host. Quỳnh Chi, former host of the adult version, joined him in the Battles and Live shows.

== Teams ==
Color key

- Winner
- Runners-up
- Third place
- Eliminated in the Live shows
- Stolen in the Battle rounds
- Eliminated in the Battle rounds

| Coach | Top 45 Artists | | | |
|---|---|---|---|---|
| Soobin Hoàng Sơn | | | | |
| Soobin Hoàng Sơn | Đỗ Thị Hoài Ngọc | Trần Quốc Thái | Đặng Hữu Lâm | Nguyễn Phi Long |
| Soobin Hoàng Sơn | Huỳnh Nguyễn Gia Hân | Hà Phương Linh | ~~Bạch Duy Khánh~~ | Trần Tuyết Đan Lê |
| Soobin Hoàng Sơn | Nguyễn Duy Linh | Trần Nam Khánh | Nguyễn Huy Hoàng | Phạm Ngọc Thiên Thanh |
| Soobin Hoàng Sơn | Lê Kim Ngân | Huỳnh Thị Ái Vy | Nguyễn Thị Minh Ngọc | Nguyễn Ngọc Châu Linh |
| Hương Tràm & Tiên Cookie | | | | |
| Hương Tràm & Tiên Cookie | Lê Châu Như Ngọc | Trần Thị Hồng Thư | Lê Thanh Ngân | Nguyễn Tâm Hào |
| Hương Tràm & Tiên Cookie | Trần Minh Thư | Nguyễn Khả Vy | ~~Hà Phương Linh~~ | Trần Ngọc Gia Hân |
| Hương Tràm & Tiên Cookie | Vũ Thị Thảo Vy | Trần Xương Nhi | Bùi Bích Vi | Nguyễn Thủy Tiên |
| Hương Tràm & Tiên Cookie | Nguyễn Võ Ngọc Giàu | Võ Lê Hoàng Ánh | Huỳnh Gia Phú | Nguyễn Trần Phương Trúc |
| Vũ Cát Tường | | | | |
| Vũ Cát Tường | Dương Ngọc Ánh | Đặng Đình Tâm | Hoàng Thị Thu Hà | Trần Nguyễn Thanh Thy |
| Vũ Cát Tường | Đào Nguyễn Hải Bình | Bạch Duy Khánh | ~~Nguyễn Tâm Hào~~ | Nguyễn Lê Minh Nguyên |
| Vũ Cát Tường | Lương Phương Linh | Nguyễn Vũ Phương Anh | Bùi Mộng Thơm | Nguyễn Ngọc Trọng |
| Vũ Cát Tường | Lê Đình Anh Đức | Phạm Lê Quốc Hưng | Vũ Tiến Dũng | Nguyễn Phi Khang |
Note: Italicized names are stolen contestants (names struck through within former teams). Bold names are Wildcard contestants who was previously eliminated but was brought back to the final.

== Blind auditions ==
Filming for the blind auditions began in late June 2017. The blind auditions consists of five episode, airing from August 12 to September 5, 2017. Each coach has the length of the contestant's performance to choose them for their team. If more than two coaches want the same contestant, the contestant will choose which team they want to join. The blind auditions end when all teams are full.

| Key | Coach hit his or her "TÔI CHỌN BẠN" (I WANT YOU) button | Contestant eliminated with no coach pressing his or her "TÔI CHỌN BẠN" (I WANT YOU) button | Contestant defaulted to this coach's team | Contestant elected to join this coach's team | Contestant received an "All Turn" |

=== Episode 1 (12 August) ===
| Order | Artist | Age | Hometown | Song | Coaches and artists choices | | |
| Order | Artist | Age | Hometown | Song | Soobin Hoàng Sơn | Hương Tràm & Tiên Cookie | Vũ Cát Tường |
|---|---|---|---|---|---|---|---|
| 1 | Vũ Thị Thảo Vy | 10 | Nghệ An | "Tôi là một ngôi sao" - Noo Phước Thịnh | | | — |
| 2 | Lê Kim Ngân | 9 | Ho Chi Minh City | "Quê nhà" - Tùng Dương | | — | — |
| 3 | Nguyễn Duy Linh | 11 | Hanoi | "Con đường tôi" - Trọng Hiếu | | | |
| 4 | Lê Thanh Ngân | 9 | Hải Phòng | "Mẹ yêu" - Phương Uyên | — | | — |
| 5 | Trần Nam Khánh | 13 | Hanoi | "Đốm lửa" - Thùy Chi | | — | — |
| 6 | Nguyễn Lê Minh Nguyên | 11 | Bình Thuận | "Vì đâu" - Siu Black | | | |
| 7 | Huỳnh Thu Hằng | 9 | Ho Chi Minh City | "Tôi thấy hoa vàng trên cỏ xanh" - Ái Phương | — | — | — |
| 8 | Vũ Nguyễn Minh Anh | 14 | Ho Chi Minh City | "Sống như những đóa hoa" - Tạ Quang Thắng | — | — | — |
| 9 | Hà Phương Linh | 12 | Hanoi | "Faded" - Alan Walker | | | |
| 10 | Nguyễn Trần Phương Trúc | 11 | Ho Chi Minh City | "Con có mẹ rồi" - Hồ Hoài Anh | | | — |
| 11 | Lê Châu Như Ngọc | 11 | Ho Chi Minh City | "Hurt" - Christina Aguilera | | | |

=== Episode 2 (19 August) ===
| Order | Artist | Age | Hometown | Song | Coaches and artists choices | | |
| Order | Artist | Age | Hometown | Song | Soobin Hoàng Sơn | Hương Tràm & Tiên Cookie | Vũ Cát Tường |
|---|---|---|---|---|---|---|---|
| 1 | Trần Thị Hồng Thư | 14 | Hanoi | "Em tôi" - Thanh Lam | | | — |
| 2 | Nguyễn Phi Long | 12 | Ho Chi Minh City | "Mưa bay tháp cổ" - Tùng Dương | | | — |
| 3 | Phạm Lê Quốc Hưng | 11 | Gia Lai | "Đã có anh hai" - Phạm Hồng Phước | — | — | |
| 4 | Trần Minh Thư | 11 | Hanoi | "Cho em gần anh thêm chút nữa" - Hương Tràm | | | — |
| 5 | Vũ Tiến Dũng | 11 | Đồng Nai | "Santa Lucia" (Traditional Neapolitan song) | — | — | |
| 6 | Trần Tuyết Đan Lê | 10 | Nghệ An | "Thềnh Thềnh Oong ơi" - Nguyễn Cường | | | |
| 7 | Nguyễn Phi Khang | 10 | Ho Chi Minh City | "Áo mùa đông" - Trọng Tấn | — | — | |
| 8 | Huỳnh Nguyễn Gia Hân | 10 | Hanoi | "Sắc màu" - Trần Thu Hà | | | |
| 9 | Huỳnh Hồng Ân | 5 | Ho Chi Minh City | "Đi học" - Bùi Đình Thảo & Minh Chính | — | — | — |
| 10 | Nguyễn Tâm Hào | 13 | Bình Dương | "Nội tôi" - Đan Trường | | | |

=== Episode 3 (26 August) ===
| Order | Artist | Age | Hometown | Song | Coaches and artists choices | | |
| Order | Artist | Age | Hometown | Song | Soobin Hoàng Sơn | Hương Tràm & Tiên Cookie | Vũ Cát Tường |
|---|---|---|---|---|---|---|---|
| 1 | Lương Phương Linh | 9 | — | "Bring Me to Life" - Evanescence | | — | |
| 2 | Trần Ngọc Gia Hân | 10 | — | "Giấc mơ trưa" - Giáng Son | | | |
| 3 | Nguyễn Vũ Phương Anh | 14 | Ho Chi Minh City | "Chợt như giấc mơ" - Võ Hạ Trâm | — | — | |
| 4 | Trần Xương Nhi | 9 | Ho Chi Minh City | "Ba kể con nghe" - Nguyễn Hải Phong | | | — |
| 5 | Đặng Đình Tâm | 11 | Thanh Hóa | "Đêm ả đào" - Tân Nhàn | | | |
| 6 | Nguyễn Khả Vy | 10 | Bình Dương | "Bão đêm" - Microwave Band | | | — |
| 7 | Hoàng Thị Thu Hà | 14 | Hà Tĩnh | "Huyền Thoại Mẹ" - Trịnh Công Sơn | | | |
| 8 | Nguyễn Thị Minh Ngọc | 10 | Nghệ An | "Đất nước lời ru" - Thu Hiền | | — | — |
| 9 | Đào Nguyễn Hải Bình | 12 | Hải Phòng | "Firework" - Katy Perry | | | |

=== Episode 4 (2 September) ===
| Order | Artist | Age | Hometown | Song | Coaches and artists choices | | |
| Order | Artist | Age | Hometown | Song | Soobin Hoàng Sơn | Hương Tràm & Tiên Cookie | Vũ Cát Tường |
|---|---|---|---|---|---|---|---|
| 1 | Bùi Mộng Thơm | 14 | Đồng Nai | "Còn thương rau đắng mọc sau hè" - Như Quỳnh | — | | |
| 2 | Nguyễn Ngọc Châu Linh | 10 | Hải Phòng | "Radio" - Hà Anh Tuấn | | | — |
| 3 | Bùi Bích Vi | 11 | Biên Hòa | "Về với Đông" - Hồng Nhung | — | | |
| 4 | Đặng Hữu Lâm | 14 | Bình Thuận | "Mái đình làng biển" - Nguyễn Cường | | | |
| 5 | Nguyễn Ngọc Trọng | 11 | Thanh Hóa | "Giấc mơ Chapi" - Y Moan | — | — | |
| 6 | Nguyễn Thủy Tiên | 14 | Ho Chi Minh City | "Nhiều người ôm giấc mơ" - Lê Cát Trọng Lý | — | | |
| 7 | Nguyễn Huy Hoàng | 14 | Thanh Hóa | "Hồ trên núi" - Phó Đức Phương | | — | — |
| 8 | Nguyễn Võ Ngọc Giàu | 9 | — | "Giấc mơ của tôi" - Phương Anh | | | |
| 9 | Nguyễn Minh Nhật | 13 | Quy Nhơn | "Ngẫu hứng sông Hồng" - Hồng Nhung | — | — | — |
| 10 | Dương Ngọc Ánh | 11 | Bắc Giang | "Hello" - Adele | | | |

=== Episode 5 (16 September) ===
| Order | Artist | Age | Hometown | Song | Coaches and artists choices | | |
| Order | Artist | Age | Hometown | Song | Soobin Hoàng Sơn | Hương Tràm & Tiên Cookie | Vũ Cát Tường |
|---|---|---|---|---|---|---|---|
| 1 | Phạm Ngọc Thiên Thanh | 11 | Ho Chi Minh City | "Nhà là nơi để về" - Yến Lê | | — | |
| 2 | Bạch Duy Khánh | 12 | Nghệ An | "Chiếc khăn piêu" - Tùng Dương | | — | |
| 3 | Lê Đình Anh Đức | 12 | Ho Chi Minh City | "Quê hương tuổi thơ tôi" - Từ Huy | — | | |
| 4 | Huỳnh Thị Ái Vy | 13 | Bình Định | "Nhật kí của mẹ" - Hiền Thục | | | — |
| 5 | Trần Quốc Thái | 10 | Thanh Hóa | "It's My Life" - Bon Jovi | | | |
| 6 | Võ Lê Hoàng Ánh | 9 | Kiên Giang | "Thời gian" - Phạm Anh Khoa | — | | — |
| 7 | Huỳnh Gia Phú | 11 | Ho Chi Minh City | "Đi để trở về" - Soobin Hoàng Sơn & Tiên Cookie | | | |
| 8 | Trần Nguyễn Thanh Thy | 12 | Hanoi | "Cha già rồi đúng không" - Phạm Hồng Phước | — | Team full | |
| 9 | Trần Thị Vân Anh | 12 | Hà Tĩnh | "Quê hương ba miền" - Thanh Sơn | — | Team full | Team full |
| 10 | Đỗ Thị Hoài Ngọc | 11 | Hải Phòng | "Uống trà" - Phạm Toàn Thắng | _{1} | _{1} | _{1} |

_{1} Hương Tràm & Tiên Cookie, Vũ Cát Tường all turned for Đỗ Thị Hoài Ngọc in spite of their teams were full. She was still joined team Soobin by default.

== The Battles ==
The Battle Round follows the same rule as previous seasons, with 5 battles from each team. However, in a new twist, a coach may save one contestant from another team to join his/her team for the Playoffs rather than from his/her own team, thus marking the first time in the history of The Voice Kids to adapt the "Steals" from the adult version. However, the "Steals" would be recorded off-stage. After this round ends, each team would have 6 contestants.

The advisors for each team in the Battles are: Hoàng Bách for team Soobin, Thùy Chi for team Tràm Tiên and Hà Anh Tuấn for team Vũ Cát Tường.

Colour key

| Artist won the Battle and advanced to the Playoffs |
| Artist lost the Battle but was saved by another coach and advanced to the Playoffs |
| Artist lost the Battle and was eliminated |

| Episode | Coach | Order | Winner | Song | Losers | | "Steal" result |
|---|---|---|---|---|---|---|---|
| Episode 6 (September 23) | Soobin Hoàng Sơn | 1 | Huỳnh Nguyễn Gia Hân | "Ngẫu hứng lý ngựa ô" - Trần Tiến | Trần Tuyết Đan Lê | Nguyễn Thị Minh Ngọc | — |
| Episode 6 (September 23) | Hương Tràm & Tiên Cookie | 2 | Trần Thị Hồng Thư | "Đánh Thức Tầm Xuân" - Dương Thụ | Nguyễn Võ Ngọc Giàu | Bùi Bích Vi | — |
| Episode 6 (September 23) | Vũ Cát Tường | 3 | Trần Nguyễn Thanh Thy | "Cảm Ơn Tình Yêu Tôi" - Phương Uyên | Nguyễn Ngọc Trọng | Phạm Lê Quốc Hưng | — |
| Episode 6 (September 23) | Vũ Cát Tường | 4 | Đặng Đình Tâm | "Quê nhà" - Trần Tiến/ "Người ơi người ở đừng về" (Traditional) | Vũ Tiến Dũng | Nguyễn Phi Khang | — |
| Episode 6 (September 23) | Hương Tràm & Tiên Cookie | 5 | Nguyễn Khả Vy | "Lý Quạ Kêu"/ "Lý Kéo Chài" (Traditional) | Vũ Thị Thảo Vy | Võ Lê Hoàng Ánh | — |
| Episode 7 (September 30) | Soobin Hoàng Sơn | 1 | Nguyễn Phi Long | "Việt Nam những chuyến đi" - Vicky Nhung | Nguyễn Duy Linh | Trần Nam Khánh | — |
| Episode 7 (September 30) | Hương Tràm & Tiên Cookie | 2 | Lê Châu Như Ngọc | "Beauty and the Beast" - Celine Dion | Hà Phương Linh | Trần Xương Nhi | Soobin Hoàng Sơn |
| Episode 7 (September 30) | Soobin Hoàng Sơn | 3 | Trần Quốc Thái | "Chưa Bao Giờ Mẹ Kể" - Min & Erik St.319 | Phạm Ngọc Thiên Thanh | Huỳnh Thị Ái Vy | — |
| Episode 7 (September 30) | Hương Tràm & Tiên Cookie | 4 | Trần Minh Thư | "Con Khóc" - Bùi Anh Tuấn | Huỳnh Gia Phú | Nguyễn Trần Phương Trúc | — |
| Episode 7 (September 30) | Vũ Cát Tường | 5 | Hoàng Thị Thu Hà | "Đèn Khuya" - Quang Linh | Bùi Mộng Thơm | Nguyễn Tâm Hào | Hương Tràm & Tiên Cookie |
| Episode 8 (October 7) | Vũ Cát Tường | 1 | Đào Nguyễn Hải Bình | "Trở Về" - MTV Band | Nguyễn Lê Minh Nguyên | Lê Đình Anh Đức | — |
| Episode 8 (October 7) | Hương Tràm & Tiên Cookie | 2 | Lê Thanh Ngân | "Khúc Ca Yêu Cuộc Đời" - Thùy Chi | Trần Ngọc Gia Hân | Nguyễn Thủy Tiên | — |
| Episode 8 (October 7) | Soobin Hoàng Sơn | 3 | Đỗ Thị Hoài Ngọc | "Chuồn chuồn ớt" - Lê Minh Sơn | Lê Kim Ngân | Nguyễn Ngọc Châu Linh | — |
| Episode 8 (October 7) | Vũ Cát Tường | 4 | Dương Ngọc Ánh | "Flashlight" - Jessie J | Lương Phương Linh | Nguyễn Vũ Phương Anh | — |
| Episode 8 (October 7) | Soobin Hoàng Sơn | 5 | Đặng Hữu Lâm | "Con cò" - Tùng Dương | Nguyễn Huy Hoàng | Bạch Duy Khánh | Vũ Cát Tường |

== Playoffs ==
In this season of The Voice Kids, all the playoff rounds is pre-recorded while only the finals show is recorded live, following the new regulation applied in the fourth season of The Voice of Vietnam. The "Wildcard" twist is also returned, bringing back one contestant who was eliminated before the finals back to the show's live finale. The audience will vote for contestants through the vote portal on the website SaoStar.vn. However, in a new twist, this year each team would receive a Wildcard, meaning that there would be 3 contestants brought back to the finals, thus a 6-contestant finale.

Color key:

| Artist was saved by the Public's votes |
| Artist was saved by his/her coach |
| Artist was originally eliminated but was brought back by the Wildcard |
| Artist was eliminated |

=== Week 1 and 2 (October 14 & 21, 2017) ===
The first 9 contestants of the 3 teams performed together at Liveshow 1. During the night, each team had 3 contestants. Results were not announced. The following 9 contestants of all three teams performed together on Liveshow 2. On that night, each team had three contestants. The results of the contestants were announced at the end of Liveshow 2 in the following manner:

- The top two contestants received the highest public vote were automatically sent through the next round.
- Three contestants selected by their coach were qualified for the next round.
- The remaining contestant was eliminated.

| Episode | Coach | Order | Artist | Song | Result |
|---|---|---|---|---|---|
| Episode 9 (October 14) | Hương Tràm & Tiên Cookie | 1 | Nguyễn Khả Vy | "Son" - Đức Nghĩa | Eliminated |
| Episode 9 (October 14) | Soobin Hoàng Sơn | 2 | Hà Phương Linh | "Stay" - Zedd & Alessia Cara | Eliminated |
| Episode 9 (October 14) | Hương Tràm & Tiên Cookie | 3 | Trần Minh Thư | "Với Em Là Mãi Mãi" - Hương Tràm | Saved by coach |
| Episode 9 (October 14) | Vũ Cát Tường | 4 | Hoàng Thị Thu Hà | "Xin Trả Tôi Về" - Hương Lan | Saved by coach |
| Episode 9 (October 14) | Soobin Hoàng Sơn | 5 | Nguyễn Phi Long | "Beat It" - Michael Jackson | Saved by coach |
| Episode 9 (October 14) | Hương Tràm & Tiên Cookie | 6 | Nguyễn Tâm Hào | "Huế Thương"/ "Mưa Trên Phố Huế" - Quang Lê | Saved by coach |
| Episode 9 (October 14) | Vũ Cát Tường | 7 | Bạch Duy Khánh | "Tháng Tư Về" - Dương Thụ | Eliminated |
| Episode 9 (October 14) | Soobin Hoàng Sơn | 8 | Trần Quốc Thái | "Untitled, 2014" - G-Dragon with Vietnamese lyrics | Public's vote |
| Episode 9 (October 14) | Vũ Cát Tường | 9 | Trần Nguyễn Thanh Thy | "Tôi Thích" - Phương Uyên | Public's vote |
| Episode 10 (October 21) | Vũ Cát Tường | 1 | Đào Nguyễn Hải Bình | "Shape of You" - Ed Sheeran | Saved by coach |
| Episode 10 (October 21) | Hương Tràm & Tiên Cookie | 2 | Trần Thị Hồng Thư | "Inh lả ơi" (Traditional)/ "Niềm vui của em" - Nguyễn Huy Hùng | Public's vote |
| Episode 10 (October 21) | Soobin Hoàng Sơn | 3 | Đặng Hữu Lâm | "The Power of Love" - Celine Dion | Saved by coach |
| Episode 10 (October 21) | Vũ Cát Tường | 4 | Dương Ngọc Ánh | "Trở Về Dòng Sông Tuổi Thơ" - Hoàng Hiệp | Saved by coach |
| Episode 10 (October 21) | Hương Tràm & Tiên Cookie | 5 | Lê Châu Như Ngọc | "Bài ca trên núi"- Trọng Tấn | Public's vote |
| Episode 10 (October 21) | Vũ Cát Tường | 6 | Đặng Đình Tâm | "Xẩm Quê Choa" (Traditional) | Public's vote |
| Episode 10 (October 21) | Soobin Hoàng Sơn | 7 | Đỗ Thị Hoài Ngọc | "Gió Mùa Về" - Lê Minh Sơn | Public's vote |
| Episode 10 (October 21) | Soobin Hoàng Sơn | 8 | Huỳnh Nguyễn Gia Hân | "La Vie en rose" - Edith Piaf | Saved by coach |
| Episode 10 (October 21) | Hương Tràm & Tiên Cookie | 9 | Lê Thanh Ngân | "Chiếc Bụng Đói" - Tiên Cookie | Saved by coach |

=== Week 3 (October 28, 2017) ===
All 15 contestants from 3 teams performed at this round. Results are based on the same method as the last round, with four contestants from each team advanced to the next round, two chosen by the public and two selected by their coaches. The remaining contestant was eliminated.

| Episode | Coach | Order | Artist | Song | Result |
|---|---|---|---|---|---|
| Episode 11 (October 28) | Soobin Hoàng Sơn | 1 | Trần Quốc Thái | "I Don't Want to Miss a Thing"- Aerosmith | Public's vote |
| Episode 11 (October 28) | Vũ Cát Tường | 2 | Hoàng Thị Thu Hà | "Điều Không Thể Mất" - Tân Nhàn | Public's vote |
| Episode 11 (October 28) | Hương Tràm & Tiên Cookie | 3 | Trần Thị Hồng Thư | "Bánh Trôi Nước" - Hoàng Thùy Linh/ "Cây Trúc Xinh" (Traditional) | Saved by coach |
| Episode 11 (October 28) | Soobin Hoàng Sơn | 4 | Huỳnh Nguyễn Gia Hân | "Cheap Thrills" - Sia | Eliminated |
| Episode 11 (October 28) | Vũ Cát Tường | 5 | Đào Nguyễn Hải Bình | "Đôi Chân Trần" - Y Moan | Eliminated |
| Episode 11 (October 28) | Hương Tràm & Tiên Cookie | 6 | Lê Thanh Ngân | "Gặp Mẹ Trong Mơ" - Thùy Chi | Saved by coach |
| Episode 11 (October 28) | Soobin Hoàng Sơn | 7 | Đặng Hữu Lâm | "Stone Cold" - Demi Lovato | Saved by coach |
| Episode 11 (October 28) | Vũ Cát Tường | 8 | Trần Nguyễn Thanh Thy | "Thu Cạn " - Giáng Son | Saved by coach |
| Episode 11 (October 28) | Hương Tràm & Tiên Cookie | 9 | Trần Minh Thư | "Mùa Hoa Trở Lại" - Khánh Linh | Eliminated |
| Episode 11 (October 28) | Soobin Hoàng Sơn | 10 | Nguyễn Phi Long | "Lột Xác" - Nguyễn Hải Phong | Saved by coach |
| Episode 11 (October 28) | Hương Tràm & Tiên Cookie | 11 | Lê Châu Như Ngọc | "Believe" - Cher | Public's vote |
| Episode 11 (October 28) | Hương Tràm & Tiên Cookie | 12 | Nguyễn Tâm Hào | "Nỗi Nhớ Cha" - Ngọc Sơn | Public's vote |
| Episode 11 (October 28) | Soobin Hoàng Sơn | 13 | Đỗ Thị Hoài Ngọc | "Vẽ" - Phạm Toàn Thắng | Public's vote |
| Episode 11 (October 28) | Vũ Cát Tường | 14 | Đặng Đình Tâm | "Trên Đỉnh Phù Vân" - Mỹ Linh | Public's vote |
| Episode 11 (October 28) | Vũ Cát Tường | 15 | Dương Ngọc Ánh | "Mamma Knows Best" - Jessie J | Saved by coach |

=== Week 4 (November 4, 2017) ===
| Episode | Coach | Order | Artist | Song | Result |
|---|---|---|---|---|---|
| Episode 12 (November 4) | Soobin Hoàng Sơn | 1 | Đặng Hữu Lâm | "Người Mù" - Bùi Caroon | Public's vote |
| Episode 12 (November 4) | Vũ Cát Tường | 2 | Dương Ngọc Ánh | "Xa Khơi" - Tân Nhân | Public's vote |
| Episode 12 (November 4) | Hương Tràm & Tiên Cookie | 3 | Lê Thanh Ngân | "Bài hát cho Bi" - Anh Quân, Mỹ Linh | Public's vote |
| Episode 12 (November 4) | Soobin Hoàng Sơn | 4 | Trần Quốc Thái | "Góc Tối" - Nguyễn Hải Phong | Wildcard |
| Episode 12 (November 4) | Vũ Cát Tường | 5 | Hoàng Thị Thu Hà | "Tạ Ơn Mẹ" - Lam Phương | Saved by coach |
| Episode 12 (November 4) | Hương Tràm & Tiên Cookie | 6 | Trần Thị Hồng Thư | "Chị Tôi" - Trọng Đài | Wildcard |
| Episode 12 (November 4) | Soobin Hoàng Sơn | 7 | Nguyễn Phi Long | "Đi Đâu Để Thấy Hoa Bay" - Hoàng Dũng | Saved by coach |
| Episode 12 (November 4) | Vũ Cát Tường | 8 | Trần Nguyễn Thanh Thy | "Người Em Yêu Mãi" - Phạm Hải Âu | Eliminated |
| Episode 12 (November 4) | Hương Tràm & Tiên Cookie | 9 | Nguyễn Tâm Hào | "Neo Đậu Bến Quê" - An Thuyên | Saved by coach |
| Episode 12 (November 4) | Soobin Hoàng Sơn | 10 | Đỗ Thị Hoài Ngọc | 'Chị Tôi" - Trần Tiến, Trần Thu Hà | Public's vote |
| Episode 12 (November 4) | Vũ Cát Tường | 11 | Đặng Đình Tâm | 'Khúc Hát Sông Quê" - Anh Thơ | Public's vote |
| Episode 12 (November 4) | Hương Tràm & Tiên Cookie | 12 | Lê Châu Như Ngọc | 'Giặt Xong Lại Mặc" - Tiên Cookie | Public's vote |

=== Week 5: Quarterfinals (November 11, 2017) ===
This week, for the first time in the show's history, all teams had to set up a minishow based on a specific theme. Each team's minishow consisted of 3 solo performances from each team members, and concluded with a group performance with their coaches. One contestant with the most public vote was sent through to the semifinals, one then saved by the coaches, and the other contestant was eliminated.

| Episode | Theme | Coach | Order | Artist | Song | Result |
|---|---|---|---|---|---|---|
| Episode 13 (November 11) | Traditional | Vũ Cát Tường | 1 | Hoàng Thị Thu Hà | "Thương Về Miền Trung" - Quang Linh | Eliminated |
| Episode 13 (November 11) | Traditional | Vũ Cát Tường | 2 | Đặng Đình Tâm | "Giọt Sương Bay Lên" - Ngọc Khuê | Public's vote |
| Episode 13 (November 11) | Traditional | Vũ Cát Tường | 3 | Dương Ngọc Ánh | "Bà Năm" - Vũ Quốc Việt | Saved by coach |
| Episode 13 (November 11) | Traditional | Vũ Cát Tường | 4 | Vũ Cát Tường and her team: "Về Miền Tây" (Cẩm Ly, Quốc Đại) | | |
| Episode 13 (November 11) | Youth and music | Soobin Hoàng Sơn | 5 | Đặng Hữu Lâm | "I Got You (I Feel Good)" - James Brown | Saved by coach |
| Episode 13 (November 11) | Youth and music | Soobin Hoàng Sơn | 6 | Nguyễn Phi Long | "Ngại Gì Khác Biệt" - Soobin Hoàng Sơn | Eliminated |
| Episode 13 (November 11) | Youth and music | Soobin Hoàng Sơn | 7 | Đỗ Thị Hoài Ngọc | "Cây Đàn Tróc Sơn" - Lưu Thiên Hương | Public's vote |
| Episode 13 (November 11) | Youth and music | Soobin Hoàng Sơn | 8 | Soobin Hoàng Sơn and his team: "Đi Và Yêu" (Soobin Hoàng Sơn) | | |
| Episode 13 (November 11) | Love | Hương Tràm & Tiên Cookie | 9 | Lê Thanh Ngân | "Tháng Tư Là Lời Nói Dối Của Em" - Hà Anh Tuấn | Saved by coach |
| Episode 13 (November 11) | Love | Hương Tràm & Tiên Cookie | 10 | Nguyễn Tâm Hào | "Tiếng Dân Chài" - Phạm Đình Chương | Eliminated |
| Episode 13 (November 11) | Love | Hương Tràm & Tiên Cookie | 11 | Lê Châu Như Ngọc | "Em Gái Mưa" - Hương Tràm | Public's vote |
| Episode 13 (November 11) | Love | Hương Tràm & Tiên Cookie | 12 | Hương Tràm, Tiên Cookie and their team: "Tuổi Đá Buồn"/ "Tuổi Đời Mênh Mông" (Trịnh Công Sơn) | | |

=== Week 6: Semifinals (November 18, 2017) ===
At the Semifinals this season, each contestant performed a solo song and a song with his/ her teammate and a guest performer. The contestant earned more total score based on 50% of the audience vote and 50% of the coach advanced to the finals. The other one was automatically eliminated.

On Sunday, November 19, 2017, the three Wildcards were announced via the show's Facebook fanpage as: Trần Thị Hồng Thư for team Hương Tràm & Tiên Cookie, Đặng Đình Tâm for team Vũ Cát Tường and Trần Quốc Thái for team Soobin Hoàng Sơn.

| Episode | Coach | Order | Artist | Song | Coach points | Public points | Total points | Result |
|---|---|---|---|---|---|---|---|---|
| Episode 14 (November 18) | Hương Tràm & Tiên Cookie | 1 | Lê Châu Như Ngọc | "Fighter" - Christina Aguilera/ "Uptown Funk" - Bruno Mars | 50 | 72 | 122 | Advanced |
| Episode 14 (November 18) | Vũ Cát Tường | 2 | Đặng Đình Tâm | "Bèo Dạt Mây Trôi"/ "Tát Nước Đầu Đình" (Traditional) | 50 | 47 | 97 | Wildcard |
| Episode 14 (November 18) | Soobin Hoàng Sơn | 3 | Đặng Hữu Lâm | "Giăng Tơ" - Tùng Dương | 50 | 44 | 94 | Eliminated |
| Episode 14 (November 18) | Hương Tràm & Tiên Cookie | 4 | Lê Thanh Ngân | "Chúc Bé Ngủ Ngon" - Thùy Chi | 50 | 28 | 78 | Eliminated |
| Episode 14 (November 18) | Soobin Hoàng Sơn | 5 | Đỗ Thị Hoài Ngọc | "Tháng Giêng" - Lưu Thiên Hương | 50 | 56 | 106 | Advanced |
| Episode 14 (November 18) | Vũ Cát Tường | 6 | Dương Ngọc Ánh | "Mặt Trời Của Tôi (’O sole mio)" - Quang Thọ | 50 | 53 | 103 | Advanced |

Non-competition performances
| Order | Performers | Song |
|---|---|---|
| 14.1 | Đông Nhi with team Hương Tràm & Tiên Cookie | "We Belong Together"- Đông Nhi |
| 14.2 | Đức Phúc with team Vũ Cát Tường | "Tình Cha" - Ngọc Sơn |
| 14.3 | Ali Hoàng Dương with team Soobin | "Về Nhà Thôi" - Ali Hoàng Dương |

=== Week 7: Finals (November 25, 2017) ===
The finals were broadcast live with the final 6's performances.

| Episode | Coach | Order | Artist | Song | % vote | Result |
|---|---|---|---|---|---|---|
| Episode 15 (November 25) | Soobin Hoàng Sơn | 1 | Trần Quốc Thái | "Người Mẹ" - Microwave Band | 8,34% | Joint 3rd Place |
| Episode 15 (November 25) | Vũ Cát Tường | 2 | Đặng Đình Tâm | "Xẩm Thập Ân" (Traditional) | 15,57% | Joint 3rd Place |
| Episode 15 (November 25) | Hương Tràm & Tiên Cookie | 3 | Lê Châu Như Ngọc | "Đêm" - Trần Thu Hà | — | Runner-up |
| Episode 15 (November 25) | Vũ Cát Tường | 4 | Dương Ngọc Ánh | "Dệt Tầm Gai" - Trần Thu Hà | 39,38% | Winner |
| Episode 15 (November 25) | Hương Tràm & Tiên Cookie | 5 | Trần Thị Hồng Thư | "Gọi Tên Bốn Mùa" - Trịnh Công Sơn | 4,65% | Joint 3rd Place |
| Episode 15 (November 25) | Soobin Hoàng Sơn | 6 | Đỗ Thị Hoài Ngọc | "Tết Trên Bản" - Lưu Thiên Hương | — | Runner-up |

Non-competition performances
| Order | Performers | Song |
|---|---|---|
| 15.1 | The Voice Kids 5 coaches | "Mong Ước Kỷ Niệm Xưa" - Xuân Phương |
| 15.2 | Trần Quốc Thái & Đỗ Thị Hoài Ngọc | "Hủ Tiếu Gõ" - Michelle Lưu |
| 15.3 | Hương Tràm & Lê Châu Như Ngọc | "Mẹ Sắp Có Em Bé" - Tiên Cookie |
| 15.4 | Vũ Cát Tường, Dương Ngọc Ánh & Đặng Đình Tâm | "Forever Mine" - Vũ Cát Tường |
| 15.5 | The Top 6 | "Lời Cảm Ơn" - Lưu Thiên Hương |

Final Result

After all teams' group performances were concluded, the voting window was officially closed. The Top 6 then took the stage to perform one final song, "Lời Cảm Ơn (Thank You)". The three finalists with the lowest votes were announced afterward as Trần Thị Hồng Thư, Trần Quốc Thái and Đặng Đình Tâm. They received the bronze prize, thus all finished in joint third places. This left the other three finalist as the official final 3. Presenter Thành Trung only announced the percentage vote of the winner only, and then crowned Dương Ngọc Ánh as the winner, after scoring 39,38% of the public votes. Đỗ Thị Hoài Ngọc and Lê Châu Như Ngọc were both announced to be runners-up.

== Elimination chart ==
Artist's info

- Artist from Team Soobin Hoàng Sơn
- Artist from Team Hương Tràm & Tiên Cookie
- Artist from Team Vũ Cát Tường

Result details

- Winner
- Runner-up
- Third place
- Saved by Wildcard
- Artist was saved by the public
- Artist was saved by his/her coach
- Artist was eliminated

Live show results per week
| Artist | Week 1+2 | Week 3 | Week 4 | Week 5 | Semi-Finals | Finals |
|---|---|---|---|---|---|---|
| Dương Ngọc Ánh | Safe | Safe | Safe | Safe | Safe | Winner |
| Đỗ Thị Hoài Ngọc | Safe | Safe | Safe | Safe | Safe | Runner-up |
| Lê Châu Như Ngọc | Safe | Safe | Safe | Safe | Safe | Runner-up |
| Đặng Đình Tâm | Safe | Safe | Safe | Safe | Wildcard | Third place |
| Trần Quốc Thái | Safe | Safe | Eliminated | Eliminated (Week 4) | Wildcard | Third place |
| Trần Thị Hồng Thư | Safe | Safe | Eliminated | Eliminated (Week 4) | Wildcard | Third place |
| Đặng Hữu Lâm | Safe | Safe | Safe | Safe | Eliminated | Eliminated (Week 6) |
| Lê Thanh Ngân | Safe | Safe | Safe | Safe | Eliminated | Eliminated (Week 6) |
| Nguyễn Phi Long | Safe | Safe | Safe | Eliminated | Eliminated (Week 5) | |
| Nguyễn Tâm Hào | Safe | Safe | Safe | Eliminated | Eliminated (Week 5) | |
| Hoàng Thị Thu Hà | Safe | Safe | Safe | Eliminated | Eliminated (Week 5) | |
| Trần Nguyễn Thanh Thy | Safe | Safe | Eliminated | Eliminated (Week 4) | | |
| Huỳnh Nguyễn Gia Hân | Safe | Eliminated | Eliminated (Week 3) | | | |
| Trần Minh Thư | Safe | Eliminated | Eliminated (Week 3) | | | |
| Đào Nguyễn Hải Bình | Safe | Eliminated | Eliminated (Week 3) | | | |
| Hà Phương Linh | Eliminated | Eliminated (Week 1+2) | | | | |
| Nguyễn Khả Vy | Eliminated | Eliminated (Week 1+2) | | | | |
| Bạch Duy Khánh | Eliminated | Eliminated (Week 1+2) | | | | |

== Contestants who appeared on previous shows or seasons ==
- Nguyễn Duy Linh competed on season 4 of The Voice Kids and joined team Noo Phước Thịnh, but was eliminated at the Battles.
- Trần Thị Hồng Thư sang in the Blind auditions of the fourth season but didn't turn a chair.
- Vũ Nguyễn Minh Anh competed on season 1 of Junior MasterChef, where she placed 4th.
- Trần Quốc Thái won Đồ Rê Mí 2013 as a double prize, along with The Voice Kids season 4 winner Trịnh Nhật Minh. He also participated in Your Face Sounds Familiar: Kids in 2016.
