= List of awards and nominations received by Vũ Cát Tường =

Vũ Cát Tường awards and nominations
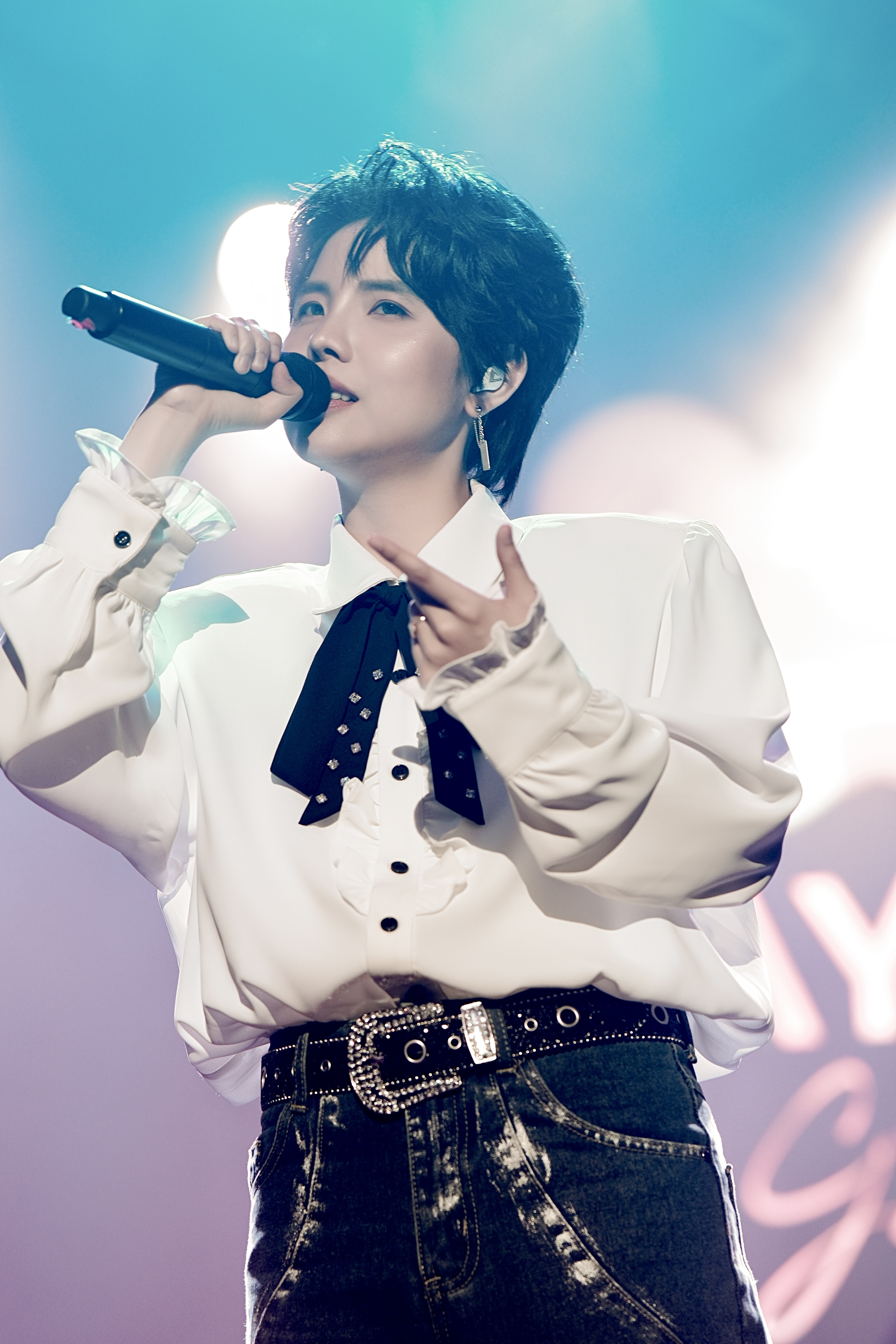
Awards and nominations
Award	Wins	Nominations
Dedication Music Award	2	6
Keeng Young Awards	6	13
The Voice of Vietnam	1	1
ELLE Women in Music	1	
The Favorite Songs	7	
Vietnamese songs	5	
Green Wave	4	
YAN Vpop 20 Awards	3	
Zing Music Awards	1	
HTV Awards	2	
VTV The song I love	1	
Mai Vàng Awards	6	1
Her World Young Woman Achiever	2	
VLive Awards	1	1
Ấn tượng VTV	1	0
Fitness & Entertainment Award	1	1
Forbes Việt Nam	1	0
Ngôi sao của năm	1	0
WeChoice Awards	1	2

Totals (Note: Certain award groups do not simply award one winner. They acknowledge several different recipients, have runners-up, and have third place. Since this is a specific recognition and is different from losing an award, runner-up mentions are considered wins in this award tally. For simplification and to avoid errors, each award in this list has been presumed to have had a prior nomination.)
- Wins: 52

Vũ Cát Tường (born October 2, 1992) is a Vietnamese singer-songwriter and record producer. During the music career, she has received 6 nominations, won 2 Dedication Music Award and an inclusion on Forbes Vietnam's 2018 30 Under 30 list, along with many other awards.

== Dedication Music Award ==
Year	Nominee / work	Award	Result	Ref.
2014	"Vết mưa"	Song of the year	Nominated	
2014	Vũ Cát Tường	New artist of the year	Won	
2015	Vũ Cát Tường	Musician of the year	Nominated	
2017	"Mơ"	Song of the year	Nominated	
2019	Vũ Cát Tường	Musician of the year	Won	
2019	"Stardom"	Album of the year	Nominated	

== Keeng Young Awards ==
Year	Nominee / work	Award	Result	Ref.
2017	Vũ Cát Tường	Best artist of the year	Nominated	
2017	Vũ Cát Tường	Composer has the most loved songs of the year	Won	
2017	"Cô gái ngày hôm qua"	OST of the year	Won	
2017	"Em ơi" (Vũ Cát Tường ft. Hakoota Dũng Hà)	Cooperative song	Nominated	
2018	Vũ Cát Tường	Best artist of the year	Nominated	
2018	Vũ Cát Tường	The most favorite singer	Won	
2018	Vũ Cát Tường	The most favorite musician	Won	
2018	Vũ Cát Tường	Artists of innovation	Won	
2018	"Leader"	MV of the year	Nominated	
2018	Stardom	Album of the year	Won	
2018	"You Are Mine"	Ca khúc của năm	Nominated	
2018	"You Are Mine"	Ca khúc nhạc Pop	Nominated	
2018	"Leader"	Ca khúc nhạc Rap/Hiphop/R&B	Nominated	

== The Voice of Vietnam ==
Year	Nominee / work	Award	Result	Ref.
2013	Vũ Cát Tường	The runner-up season 2	Won	

== ELLE Women in Music ==
Year	Nominee / work	Award	Result	Ref.
2014	Vũ Cát Tường	One of four honored female singers	Won	

== The Favorite Songs ==
Year	Nominee / work	Award	Result	Ref.
2014	"Vết mưa"	Favorite song of month in liveshow on January	Won	
2015	"Anh và Anh"	Favorite song of month in liveshow on March	Won	
2015	"Phai"	Favorite song of month in liveshow on May	Won	
2015	"Phai"	The most effective music mix in liveshow on May	Won	
2015	"Mơ"	Favorite song of month in liveshow on December	Won	
2015	"Mơ"	Impressive song in liveshow on December	Won	
2016	"Mơ"	The favorite song of the Month in liveshow on January	Won	

== Vietnamese songs ==
Year	Nominee / work	Award	Result	Ref.
2014	Vũ Cát Tường	Effective performing singer with the song "Yêu xa" in liveshow on August	Won	
2014	Vũ Cát Tường	Passive and creative with the song " Yêu xa" in liveshow on August	Won	
2014	"Yêu xa"	Favorite song	Won	
2014	"Yêu xa"	The song voted the press council	Won	
2015	"Phai"	Song voted by viewers	Won	

== Green Wave ==
Year	Nominee / work	Award	Result
2014	Vũ Cát Tường	Prospective singer	Won
2014	Vũ Cát Tường	Top 10 composers of the year	Won
2017	Vũ Cát Tường	Award of dedication	Won
2018	Vũ Cát Tường	Top 10 most favorite singer	Won
2018	Vũ Cát Tường	Female artist of the year	Nominated

== YAN Vpop 20 Awards ==
Year	Nominee / work	Award	Result	Ref.
2014	Vũ Cát Tường	New artist of the year	Won	
2014	Vũ Cát Tường	Top 20 singers of the year	Won	
2015	Vũ Cát Tường	Top 20 singers of the year	Won	

== Zing Music Awards ==
Year	Nominee / work	Award	Result
2014	Vũ Cát Tường	Prospective singer	Won

== HTV Awards ==
Year	Nominee / work	Award	Result	Ref.
2015	Vũ Cát Tường	The most favorite singer	Nominated	
2015	Vũ Cát Tường	The most favorite musician	Won	
2016	Vũ Cát Tường	The most favorite singer	Nominated	
2016	Vũ Cát Tường	The most favorite musician	Won	

== VTV The song I love ==
Year	Nominee / work	Award	Result	Ref.
2016	"Mơ"	The Gold Music Video	Won	

== Mai Vàng Awards ==
Year	Nominee / work	Award	Result	Ref.
2016	"Mơ"	Song of the year	Won	
2016	Vũ Cát Tường	Top 10 artists of the year	Won	
2016	Vũ Cát Tường	The most favorite singer of the year	Won	
2017	Vũ Cát Tường	Top 10 artists of the year	Won	
2017	Vũ Cát Tường	The most favorite singer of the year	Won	
2018	Vũ Cát Tường	The most favorite singer of the year	Nominated	

== Her World Young Woman Achiever ==
Year	Nominee / work	Award	Result	Ref.
2016	Vũ Cát Tường	Composer award by Art Board	Won	
2016	Vũ Cát Tường	Composer award voted by readers	Won	

== VLive Awards ==
Year	Nominee / work	Award	Result	Ref.
2017	Vũ Cát Tường	Best Female Artist	Won	
2018	Vũ Cát Tường	Artist of the year	Nominated	

== Ấn tượng VTV ==
Year	Nominee / work	Award	Result	Ref.
2017	Vũ Cát Tường	Impressive singer of the year	Won	

== Fitness and Entertainment Award ==
Year	Nominee / work	Award	Result	Ref.
2017	Vũ Cát Tường	People's Choice Most Inspirational #IAMMORE	Won	
2018	Vũ Cát Tường	Fitness & Entertainment Icon of the Year	Nominated	

== Forbes Việt Nam ==
Year	Nominee / work	Award	Result	Ref.
2018	Vũ Cát Tường	Top 30 Under 30	Won	

== Ngôi sao của năm ==
Year	Nominee / work	Award	Result	Ref.
2018	Vũ Cát Tường	Star of the year	Won	

== WeChoice Awards ==
Year	Nominee / work	Award	Result	Ref.
2014	Vũ Cát Tường	Best female artist of the year	Nominated	
2016	"Mơ"	MV of the year	Nominated	
2018	Vũ Cát Tường	Artists have outstanding activities	Won	

== Other awards ==
Year	Award	Category
2007	Giai điệu Tuổi hồng Toàn quốc	Silver Medal
2008	Tiếng ca học đường	The third prize
2011	IU Singer	The first prize
2011	Coca-Cola Music Award	The second prize
2011	Coca-Cola Music Award	The most impressive performance awards
2011	GE Foundation Scholar-Leaders’ scholarships	Top 10 most excellent Vietnamese students
