= Junior MasterChef Vietnam =

- Created by: Franc Roddam
- Judges: Phan Tôn Tịnh Hải; Alain Nguyễn; Jack Lee
- Country of origin: Vietnam
- Original language: Vietnamese
- No. of seasons: 1
- No. of episodes: 13

Production
- Production company: BHD Company - VTV

Original release
- Network: VTV
- Release: 2 October – 25 December 2016

The first season of Junior MasterChef Vietnam has been launched to search for budding kid chefs in the country.

== Seasons ==
Season	Premiere date	Finale date	No. of Finalists	Winner	Runner(s)-up	Judge 1	Judge 2	Judge 3
1	2 October 2016	25 December 2016	12	Đinh Thanh Hải	Nguyễn Danh Đức Hải	Phan Tôn Tịnh Hải	Alain Nguyễn	Jack Lee
