= Vũ Cát Tường =

Vietnamese singer-songwriter

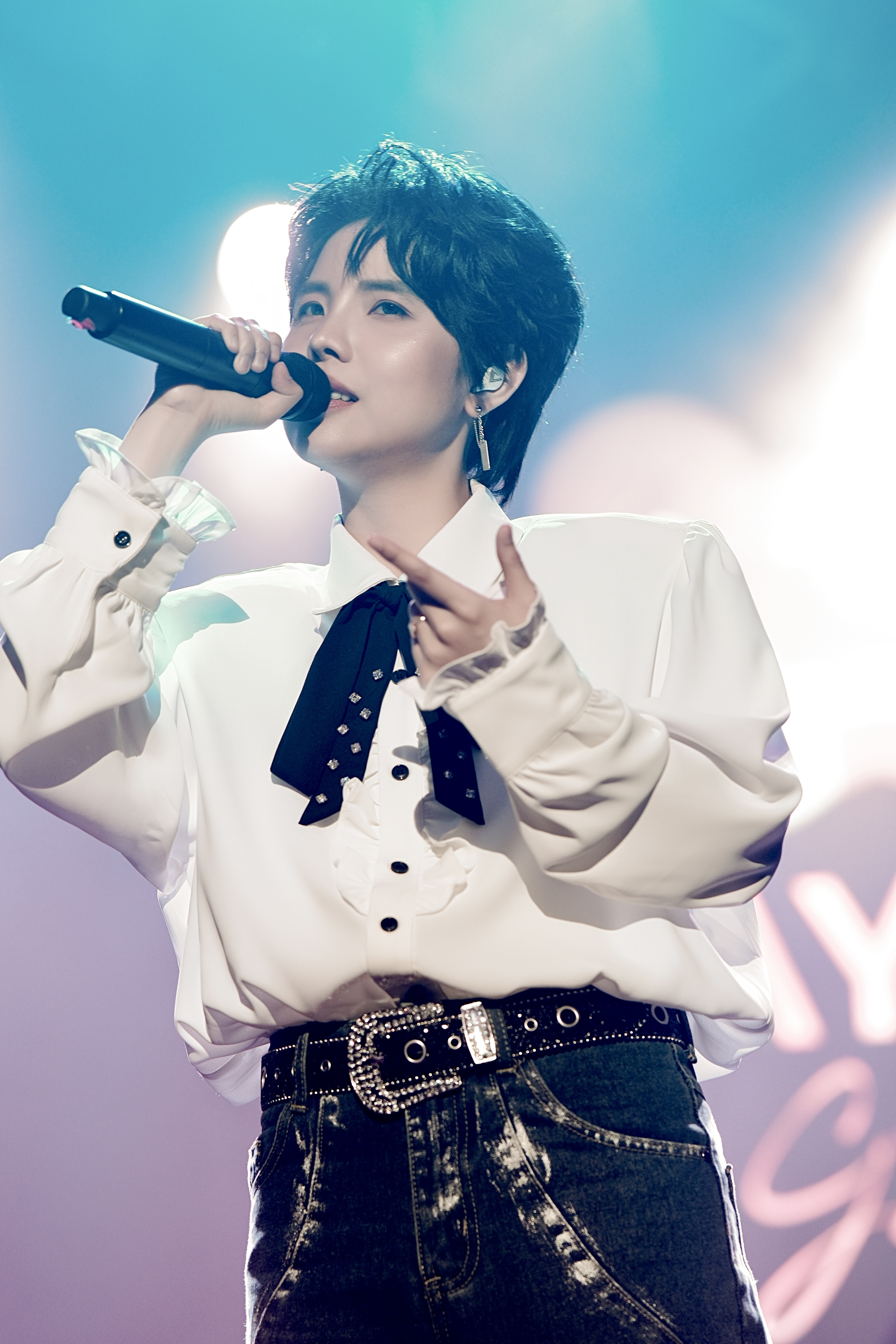
- Vũ Cát Tường in 2025
- Born: October 2, 1992 (age 34); Long Xuyên, An Giang, Vietnam
- Education: Ho Chi Minh City International University
- Occupations: Singer-songwriter; record producer; rapper; television judge; businesswoman
- Years active: 2013–present
- Awards: Full list
- Musical career
- Genres: Ballad; R&B; Neo soul; Pop; Electropop; Blues; Jazz; Alternative rock; Funk
- Instruments: Vocals; piano; ukulele; drum
- Labels: UMG; The Little Prince Entertainment
- Website: vucattuongofficial.com

Signature
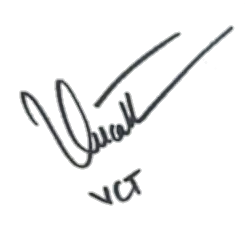

Vũ Cát Tường - VCT (born October 2, 1992) is a Vietnamese singer-songwriter, music producer, who was a runner-up on season 2 of The Voice of Vietnam. During the music career, he has received 6 nominations, won 2 Dedication Music Awards and an inclusion on Forbes Vietnam's 2018 30 Under 30 list, along with many other awards. he is the first Vietnamese artist to have an album distributed by Universal Music Group, and VCT is also the first Vietnamese artist to have a bilingual album recorded in one of the most famous record studios in the world - United Recordings.

In 2025, Vũ Cát Tường participated in the second season of the show Anh trai "say hi" and successfully made it into the final "Best 5" lineup.

== Early life ==
Vũ Cát Tường was born on October 2, 1992, at Long Xuyên, An Giang Province, Vietnam. He studied at Ho Chi Minh City International University from 2010 to 2015 and received a bachelor's degree in Biomedical Engineering.

In 2012, Vũ Cát Tường received attention from The Voice of Vietnam executive producer, Phương Uyên, after performing her self-penned song, "Đông", Phương Uyên bought the song for a contestant of The Voice of Vietnam season 1 to perform, and had Vũ Cát Tường playing the piano during the performance.

== Life and career ==
=== 2013: The Voice of Vietnam and career beginnings ===
Vũ Cát Tường auditioned for The Voice of Vietnam season 2, singing "Đông" in her blind audition. All four coaches, Đàm Vĩnh Hưng, Mỹ Linh, Quốc Trung and Hồng Nhung turned her chair for her and Vũ Cát Tường eventually chose to join team Đàm Vĩnh Hưng.

Vũ Cát Tường was pitted against fellow team Đàm Vĩnh Hưng member, Song Tú, who defeated her after singing "One Night Only". Although not chosen as the winner, he received three "steals" from other coaches and opted for Hồng Nhung. In the Knockout round, Vũ Cát Tường sang "Cám ơn tình yêu tôi" by Phương Uyên and advanced to the Live shows.

In the semi-final round, coach Hồng Nhung gave her all 100% of her point, which advanced her to the finale without any public vote counted. In the live finale broadcast on December 15, 2013, he was declared the second runner-up of the second season, behind team Đàm Vĩnh Hưng's Vũ Thảo My and team Mỹ Linh's Nguyễn Hoàng Tôn.

The Voice performances

Stage	Song	Original artist	Date	Order	Result
Blind Audition	"Đông"	Original song	June 9, 2013	3.11	All four chairs turned Joined Team Đàm Vĩnh Hưng
Battles	"One Night Only" (vs. Nguyễn Song Tú)	Jennifer Hudson	July 21, 2013	8.5	Defeated; Stolen by Hồng Nhung
Knockouts (Top 40)	"Cảm Ơn Tình Yêu Tôi" (vs. Trương Thảo Nhi)	Phương Uyên	August 25, 2013	12.8	Saved by coach
Live Top 20	"Run the World (Girls)"/"Billie Jean"	Beyoncé/ Michael Jackson	September 29, 2013	15.10	Saved by Public Vote
Live Top 16	"Bài Hát Ru Mùa Đông"	Hồng Nhung	October 27, 2013	17.9	Saved by coach
Live Top 12	"Vết Mưa"	Original song	November 17, 2013	19.10	Saved by coach
Live Semi-finals (Top 8)	"The Power of Love"	Celine Dion	November 24, 2013	20.7	Advanced
Live Semi-finals (Top 8)	"Mẹ"	Original song	December 8, 2013	21.3	Advanced
Live Finale (Final 4)	"I Don't Know"	Nri, Achioem	December 15, 2013	22.4	Second runner-up
Live Finale (Final 4)	"Xin Cho Tôi"	Trịnh Công Sơn	December 15, 2013	22.8	Second runner-up
Live Finale (Final 4)	"Papa" medley (with Hồng Nhung)	Paul Anka/ Hồng Nhung	December 15, 2013	22.11	Second runner-up

=== 2014–2016: Release MV, Album Vol.1, The Voice Kids ===
In 2014, Vũ Cát Tường released her first products created by herself: "Yêu xa" is a love story of two lovers who must be temporarily apart. On pop background played by piano, the song has bright colors but still full of narrative feelings. This is the first single from Vũ Cát Tường's debut album, which marked her collaboration with musician Huy Tuấn, who is the music producer of the album. After the debut, this song received a lot of attention and reached the top of the music charts. Vũ Cát Tường also released this music video, the MV uses body language to create a poetic but daring multidimensional way of romance over geographical distances. At the end of 2014, Vũ Cát Tường released her first album Giải mã (Decode) (December 23). The songs in this album were all composed by Vũ Cát Tường with her true nostalgia and emotions about life. After that, Vũ Cát Tường also produced an MV for a song in the album Giải mã (Decode): "Anh và Anh".

In 2015, Vũ Cát Tường released two singles that were "Góc đa hình" for fans in the summer and single "Phai" with a new remix. These two years also marked the moments when the name Vũ Cát Tường "bombarded" the awards, the rankings. These are the recognition for Vũ Cát Tường's creation, the music products regarded by the audience and highly appreciated by the experts.

After 1 gap year, Vũ Cát Tường returned, the first shot in 2016 was the release of the "Mơ" single – one of the hits that built Vũ Cát Tường's music career. "Mơ" is a soulful version of Soul & R&B music that had Vũ Cát Tường's hidden minds. The song still holds the style of Vũ Cát Tường with the loosened melody and the romantic lyrics. The message that he wants to convey in this song is "the peaceful moments watching the moon on the terrace".

Vũ Cát Tường continued to release a new song "Don't you go". This is a song from the Neo Soul, R&B, Pop rock genre with the mix of Khắc Hưng. Don't you go has a jubilant melody full of life, different from Vũ Cát Tường's previous romantic rhythmic ballads before.

At the beginning of August, one of Vũ Cát Tường's songs named "Vết mưa" was accused of plagiarism from a Japanese pianist's music. After experiencing criticism from the media and the public, Vũ Cát Tường contacted the Japanese artist involved and provided her own demo for the song which was recorded before the Japanese pianist's song in question. Following this, the Japanese artist announced on her Facebook that Vũ Cát Tường's song "Vết mưa" is not related to her song.

Later in August, Vũ Cát Tường released a new single – "Góc ban công".

Beside releasing new products in the year, Vũ Cát Tường accepted to join The Voice Kids 2016 with the role of a trainer. Đào Nguyên Thụy Bình – representing the team Vũ Cát Tường entered the final round, won the position of the runner-up of The Voice Kids of Vietnam 2016. Immediately after The Voice Kids 2016 closed, Vũ Cát Tường released a new single called "Tôi" duet with Đào Nguyên Thụy Bình.

Single "Ngày hôm qua" was released in early 2017. Her composition took Funk with R&B as the main theme, the harmony was mixed from the electronic sound played on acoustic background.

=== 2017: Igniting and shining ===
On the occasion of Valentine's Day, Vũ Cát Tường officially released a new song titled "Em ơi". Especially, the song also has the contribution of Hakoota Dũng Hà, Vũ Cát Tường's friend from The Voice season 1.

After releasing the audio version of the song "Cô gái ngày hôm qua" in March, Vũ Cát Tường continued to make the music video for this song. This is the soundtrack for the movie project "Cô gái đến từ hôm qua" adapted from the literary same-name work by writer Nguyễn Nhật Ánh.

At the end of July, Vũ Cát Tường produced a new single titled "Vài phút trước" collaborating with musician Nguyễn Thanh Bình to create an R&B & Soul style track. Especially in newer songs, Vũ Cát Tường has dabbled in rap, and this was the first new genre Vũ Cát Tường had stepped into.

In mid-2017, Vũ Cát Tường confirmed the return of the "hot seat" of The Voice Kids.

In parallel with the journey of The Voice Kids 2017, Vũ Cát Tường still had her own projects: releasing the single "Buổi sáng bình thường" with an animated MV. The MV conveys the message: Love is not such a great thing to find, it is no need of luxury to be happy, The most meaningful things when being together come from the most normal things.

On October 14, Vũ Cát Tường organized the first "Birthday Concert" with about 5,000 attendants celebrating the 25th anniversary as well as affirming the musical path with her own marks.

After her "Birthday Concert", Vũ Cát Tường released the last single of 2017 – "Come Back Home", which was performed in Birthday Concert before being released officially. Vũ Cát Tường released her first perfume brand at the end of 2017, entitled "Come Back Home". This was the first in a collection called "The Notes". With this perfume, Vũ Cát Tường had the opportunity to collaborate and work together with the world's leading scent-producing company: Firmenich.

=== 2018–2019: A year of breakthrough and sublimation in creation ===
Together with the national atmosphere congratulating the Vietnam U23 team for achieving AFC runner-up trophy – Asia U23 Championship, Vũ Cát Tường presented to the whole team her own song titled "Chiến thắng". The song was written in 2 hours when Vũ Cát Tường was on the plane touring.

In February, on the occasion of Valentine's Day, Vũ Cát Tường released the new song "You Are Mine", as a statement of Vũ Cát Tường about love only with the sincerely cultivate feelings, without any boundaries of age, gender.

On April 24, Vũ Cát Tường attended the event to honor the top 30 most prominent under-30 people in Vietnam in 2018 by Forbes Vietnam. As one of the young faces honored in the field of Art – Creation, Vũ Cát Tường appeared and attracted a lot of attention from the guests.

In May, Vũ Cát Tường officially released her own fashion collection called "Be A Fool", including many easy-to-use items such as T-shirts, shirts, trousers, blazer blouses.

In June, Vũ Cát Tường became one of the three names chosen by UM channel to be the representative for this channel. UM Channel is a combination of Yeah1 Group and Universal Music Group, which is a TV channel in Vietnam specializing in domestic and foreign music, movie review, exclusive images of Vietnamese artists at international events.

After the success of the first perfume bottle in "The Notes" collection, Vũ Cát Tường continued to cooperate with Firmenich, the world's leading scent company to officially release the next perfume named "The Little Prince " in July.

On July 20, Vũ Cát Tường officially became the ambassador of Clavinova brand of Yamaha Music Vietnam.

One more year, Vũ Cát Tường confirmed to sit on the "hot seat" of The Voice Kids 2018, but this time Vũ Cát Tường is no longer alone because he had a companion, trainer Soobin Hoàng Sơn, creating Bin – Vũ Cát Tường team – one of the three trainers team of The Voice Kids 2018. The two young talents Xuân Phương and Anh Tuấn were excellent when they won two official tickets to enter the final round, gaining the title of runner-up of The Voice Kids 2018.

At the end of September, Vũ Cát Tường confirmed attending the Asia Song Festival 2018 as a Vietnamese artist invited to perform in Busan, South Korea on October 3. Asia Song Festival is a continental music event and has been held annually in South Korea since 2004.

On October 2, right on her birthday, Vũ Cát Tường officially released a new song "Leader" – marking a big change in Vũ Cát Tường's music.

On October 18, Vũ Cát Tường released her official Album Vol.2 "Stardom" with the concert to celebrate 5-year singer-songwriter and record producer career. Album Stardom has new materials such as Pop, R&B, Neo Soul, Blue, Hip hop, Rap, ... and crystallizes Vũ Cát Tường's music style in the last 5 years. The whole images of the album were taken by the Korean ekip, and Ms. Lưu Thiên Hương was the main co-producer. The album marked Vũ Cát Tường in music was 5 years old and Vũ Cát Tường in life has turned 26. The 10 songs clearly reflect the path that Vũ Cát Tường chose, and her view of work, love, original and freedom.

On November 10, Vũ Cát Tường's Stardom Concert took place at Lan Anh stadium with more than 3,000 attendants and friends and colleagues of Vũ Cát Tường as guests. Vũ Cát Tường performed with a hologram effect and her 20 performances consisted of 10 previous songs and all 10 songs in the new album.

After the grand concert, Vũ Cát Tường was still full of energy and preparing for the album promotion abroad tour. Universal Music Group and Vũ Cát Tường accompanied in the promotion campaign in Singapore, performing in the famous Fashion Show Council of Asean Fashion Designer in Malaysia.

At the end of 2018, Vũ Cát Tường released a Christmas commemorative song "Christmas Night". This song is a charity fundraiser for the end of the year, all the proceeds from selling this song's download on Vũ Cát Tường's website were donated to babies infected with HIV/AIDS at Mai Tâm Shelter.

On June 1, 2019, Vũ Cát Tường officially announced the "VCT Tour 2019". After that, Vũ Cát Tường revealed the first place to host "VCT Tour 2019" is Hanoi with a concert titled "Dear Hanoi,".

=== 2020: During the COVID-19 pandemic ===
On April 2, 2020, in the middle of the COVID-19 pandemic and salt-drought in the west of Vietnam has affected to the community, Vũ Cát Tường has announced about the Tomorrow Project - a single release and fund-raising to help the community. The project lasted for 2 weeks and collected the amount of 200 million VND (~US$8000).

On November 5, Vu Cat Tuong released the lead single of her new EP - "Hành Tinh Ánh Sáng" (Planet of light). Then on November 18, her first EP "Một Triệu Năm Ánh Sáng" (One Million Light Years) released in both digital and physical versions. Before the EP was released, it was on the No.1 of the most pre-ordered albums on Apple Music Vietnam and the physical merchandise combo has also sold out in 48 hours after on sale.

== Personal life ==
He is married to Vũ Thu Trang (Bí Đỏ) in 2025.

== Discography ==
=== Studio albums ===
Title	Album details
Giải mã (Decode)	Released: December 23, 2014; Formats: Streaming, CD; Producer: Huy Tuấn; Track listing: 1. Phai; 2. Niềm yêu khác 3. Anh và anh 4. Yêu xa 5. Hẹn yêu 6. Chơ vơ 7. Vết mưa 8. Đông; 9. Hôn
Stardom	Released: October 18, 2018; Formats: Streaming, CD; Producer: Lưu Thiên Hương, Vũ Cát Tường; Track listing: 1. Leader; 2. Stardom; 3. Be A Fool; 4. Nobody; 5. One Second; 6. San Francisco; 7. If; 8. Gucci in Town; 9. This Love; 10. The Party Song
Inner Me	Released: November 30, 2019; Formats: Streaming, USB; Producer: Michael Choi, Vũ Cát Tường; Track listing: 1. Có Người (Someone); 2. Dõi Theo (Watching You From Afar); 3. Hỏi Thăm (How Are You?); 4. Gió (Wind); 5. The Old You (English); 6. Ticket For Two (English); 7. Yours (English); 8. Forever Mine; 9. Gió (Wind - Chill version)
Một Triệu Năm Ánh Sáng (One Million Light Years)	Released: November 18, 2020; Formats: Streaming, CD; Producer: Vũ Cát Tường; Track listing: 1. Hành Tinh Ánh Sáng (The planet of light); 2. TÌm Hành Tinh Khác (Another planet); 3. Phi Hành Gia Cô Đơn (Lonely astronaut); 4. Một Triệu Năm Ánh Sáng (One million light years); 5. Planet E (Bonus track - English)

=== Singles ===
Year	Title	Notes
2013	Đông	From album "Giải mã (Decode)"
2013	Vết Mưa	From album "Giải mã (Decode)"
2014	Yêu Xa	From album "Giải mã (Decode)"
2015	Góc Đa Hình	
2015	Phai	From album "Giải mã (Decode)"
2016	Mơ	
2016	Don't You Go	
2016	Góc Ban Công	
2016	Tôi	With Thụy Bình
2016	Ngày Hôm Qua	
2017	Em Ơi	With Hakoota Dũng Hà
2017	Cô Gái Ngày Hôm qua	OST The Girl From Yesterday
2017	Vài Phút Trước	
2017	Buổi Sáng Bình Thường	With Hoàng Phong
2017	Come Back Home	
2018	Chiến thắng	
2018	You Are Mine	
2018	Leader	From album "Stardom"
2018	Christmas Night	
2019	Có Người (Someone)	From album "Inner Me"
2020	Ngày Mai (Tomorrow)	Single for Fund-raising project
2020	Hành Tinh Ánh Sáng	From EP "Một Triệu Năm Ánh Sáng"
2024	Từng Là	
2025	Ngày Này, Người Con Gái Này (This Day, This Girl)	With Pumpkin (Thu Trang)

== Reality TV show ==
Year	Program/Competition	Role	Broadcast
2025	Anh trai "say hi" season 2	Contestant	HTV2 - Vie Channel

== Concerts and Tour ==
=== Concerts ===
- October 14, 2017: The 1st Birthday Concert in Ho Chi Minh City.
- November 10, 2018: Stardom Concert at Lan Anh Stadium, Ho Chi Minh City.

=== Tour ===
VCT Tour 2019.

- August 31, 2019: Dear Hanoi in Hanoi, Vietnam.
- December 15, 2019: Inner Me in Ho Chi Minh City, Vietnam.
