= The Voice Kids of Vietnam season 4 =

The Voice Kids of Vietnam
- Season 4
- Hosted by: Ngô Kiến Huy; Chi Pu (backstage)
- Judges: Noo Phước Thịnh; Đông Nhi; Ông Cao Thắng; Vũ Cát Tường
- Winner: Trịnh Nhật Minh
- Winning coach: Đông Nhi & Ông Cao Thắng
- Runner-up: Đào Nguyên Thụy Bình

Release
- Original network: VTV3
- Original release: July 23 – October 29, 2016

Season chronology
- Next → Season 5

The fourth season of The Voice Kids of Vietnam- Giọng hát Việt nhí began on 23 July 2017 on VTV3. New coaches for this season were The Remix winners Noo Phước Thịnh, Đông Nhi with her boyfriend Ông Cao Thắng and The Voice season 2 runner-up Vũ Cát Tường. Trịnh Nhật Minh won the competition on 29 October, marking the couple Nhi Thắng's first victory on the show.

== Coaches and hosts ==
The coaching panel was entirely modified as producers wanted to "refresh the show with young generation's energy". After the season 3 finale, it was announced that the duo Giang Hồ would leave the show because of Lưu Hương Giang's pregnancy. Hồ Hoài Anh then moved to become the show's music executive. Cẩm Ly also expressed her desire to withdraw from the show to focus on other projects. Dương Khắc Linh did not return for the fourth season in 2016 because of his work on The X Factor Vietnam. In March 2016, Đông Nhi and Ông Cao Thắng were confirmed to be replacing the duo Giang Hồ as coaches for the fourth season. Noo Phước Thịnh was announced to be the third judge on 11 April. Although rumors stated that the fourth coach would be Sơn Tùng M-TP, on 6 June, The Voice season 2 runner-up Vũ Cát Tường was confirmed to be joining the show as the fourth and final judge. Meanwhile, singer and TV show host Ngô Kiến Huy became the show's new host, and was joined by actress Chi Pu in the liveshows.

== Teams ==
Color key

- Winner
- Runner-up
- Third place
- Fourth place
- Eliminated in the Live shows
- Eliminated in the Battle rounds

Coaches	Top 45 Artists				
Noo Phước Thịnh					
Noo Phước Thịnh	Nguyễn Hoàng Mai Anh	Nguyễn Khánh Ngọc	Lê Băng Giang	Chu Tuấn Ngọc	Trần Minh Nguyệt
Noo Phước Thịnh	Trần Khánh Huyền	Lê Quang Diễn	Trần Tina	Phạm Linh Phương	Nguyễn Ngọc Phụng
Noo Phước Thịnh	Bùi Vũ Tường Vi	Dương Gia Kiệt	Nguyễn Ngọc Phương Nhi	Nguyễn Linh Nhi	Nguyễn Duy Linh
Đông Nhi & Ông Cao Thắng					
Đông Nhi & Ông Cao Thắng	Trịnh Nhật Minh	Bùi Gia Quý	Vũ Đàm Thùy Dung	Trần Ngọc Quang	Nguyễn Kim Anh
Đông Nhi & Ông Cao Thắng	Lê Khánh Linh	Đặng Hồng Hải	Giang Hoàng Lâm	Huỳnh Thị Hoài Thương	Phan Nguyễn Hà My
Đông Nhi & Ông Cao Thắng	Nguyễn Ngọc Hà Chi	Nguyễn Lê Hiền Trân	Nguyễn Thị Như Quỳnh	Lê Võ Thùy Dung	Phạm Thị Thu Huệ
Vũ Cát Tường					
Vũ Cát Tường	Đào Nguyên Thụy Bình	Milana Zavolokina	Hồ Thảo Nguyên	Chiara Falcone	Vũ Hoàng Minh
Vũ Cát Tường	Nguyễn Hoàng Vân Trang	Phạm Nguyễn Khánh Linh	Nguyễn Thị Thúy Phượng	Nguyễn Lê Thu Hương	Nguyễn Tiến Hiếu
Vũ Cát Tường	Nguyễn Thị Thùy Trang	Hoàng Minh Chánh	Trần Đình Nguyên	Lưu Tuyết Nhi	Nguyễn Hải Anh

== Blind auditions ==
The blind auditions consist of five episodes, airing from 23 July to 20 August 2016. Each coach has the length of the contestant's performance to choose them for their team. If more than two coaches want the same contestant, the contestant will choose which team they want to join. The blind auditions end when all teams are full.

Key	Coach hit their "TÔI CHỌN BẠN" (I WANT YOU) button	Contestant eliminated with no coach pressing their "TÔI CHỌN BẠN" (I WANT YOU) button	Contestant defaulted to this coach's team	Contestant elected to join this coach's team

=== Episode 1 (23 July) ===
Order	Artist	Age	Hometown	Song	Coaches and artists choices		
Order	Artist	Age	Hometown	Song	Noo	Nhi Thắng	Tường
1	Nguyễn Ngọc Hà Chi	9	Hanoi	"Đừng ngồi yên trong bóng tối" - Đông Nhi			—
2	Chu Tuấn Ngọc	9	Hanoi	"Con có mẹ rồi" - Hồ Hoài Anh			—
3	Trần Đình Nguyên	13	Hanoi	"Đông" - Vũ Cát Tường			
4	Phùng Thị Bích Thuận	—	—	"My friend" - Mỹ Tâm	—	—	—
5	Nguyễn Ngọc Hoài An	—	—	"Giấc mơ mong manh" - Ngọc Lễ	—	—	—
6	Nguyễn Khánh Ngọc	10	Thanh Hóa	"Son" - Đức Nghĩa			
7	Nguyễn Thị Thúy Phượng	11	Thái Nguyên	"Hai cô tiên" - 365DaBand	—	—	
8	Lê Võ Thùy Dung	10	Quảng Ngãi	Lá cờ" - Tạ Quang Thắng			—
9	Vũ Đàm Thùy Dung	10	Ho Chi Minh City	"Dạ cổ hoài lang" - Cao Văn Lầu			
10	Nguyễn Linh Nhi	12	Hanoi	"Treasure"- Bruno Mars		—	—
11	Trịnh Nhật Minh	10	Hanoi	"Đá trông chồng" - Thanh Lam			

=== Episode 2 (30 July) ===
Order	Artist	Age	Hometown	Song	Coaches and artists choices		
Order	Artist	Age	Hometown	Song	Noo	Nhi Thắng	Tường
1	Hoàng Minh Chánh	13	—	"Giọt sương trên mí mắt" - Hồng Nhung	—		
2	Phạm Thị Thu Huệ	15	Thanh Hóa	"Trước Ngày hội bắn" - Trịnh Quý			—
3	Nguyễn Lê Hiền Trân	9	Cần Thơ	"Bà mẹ quê" - Phạm Duy	—		—
4	Phạm Linh Phương	12	Hải Phòng	"Việt Nam trong tôi là" - Yến Lê			
5	Lưu Tuyết Nhi	13	Quảng Bình	"Diamonds" - Rihanna	—	—	
6	Bùi Vũ Tường Vi	12	Đồng Nai	"Đất nước lời ru" - Thu Hiền		—	—
7	Phạm Đình Tây	12	Hà Tĩnh	"Bão lũ" - Vũ Quốc Việt	—	—	—
8	Milana Zavolokina	10	Russia	"Về ăn cơm" - Sa Huỳnh			
9	Phan Nguyễn Hà My	13	Hanoi	"Bang Bang Boom Boom" - Đinh Hương	—		—
10	Trần Ngọc Quang	13	Hanoi	"Bang Bang" - Jessie J			

=== Episode 3 (6 August) ===
Order	Artist	Age	Hometown	Song	Coaches and artists choices		
Order	Artist	Age	Hometown	Song	Noo	Nhi Thắng	Tường
1	Nguyễn Hoàng Mai Anh	10	Ho Chi Minh City	"Tàu anh qua núi" - Thanh Hoa			—
2	Nguyễn Xuân Phương	9	—	"Chong chóng gió" - Hồ Hoài Anh	—	—	—
3	Nguyễn Kim Anh	12	Hanoi	"Một phút giây" - Thanh Bùi			
4	Nguyễn Trường Lâm Kha	—	—	"Ngẫu hứng ngựa ô" - Trần Tiến	—	—	—
5	Phạm Duy Lân	—	—	"Sáng tối" - Nguyễn Hải Phong	—	—	—
6	Trần Minh Nguyệt	12	Nam Định	"Can You Feel the Love Tonight?" - Elton John		—	
7	Phạm Nguyễn Khánh Linh	12	Hải Phòng	"Chạy" - Phạm Toàn Thắng	—		
8	Vũ Hoàng Minh	10	—	"Con cò" - Tùng Dương	—	—	
9	Nguyễn Ngọc Phụng	11	Ho Chi Minh City	"Chạy" - Đinh Kiếm Hào			
10	Huỳnh Thị Hoài Thương	13	Ho Chi Minh City	"Tôi ru em ngủ" - Trịnh Công Sơn	—		—
11	Nguyễn Thị Như Quỳnh	12	Thanh Hóa	"Đồ chơi đất" - Quang Anh	—		—
12	Dương Gia Kiệt	10	Đà Nẵng	"Tự nguyện" - Trương Quốc Khánh			

=== Episode 4 (13 August) ===
Order	Artist	Age	Hometown	Song	Coaches and artists choices		
Order	Artist	Age	Hometown	Song	Noo	Nhi Thắng	Tường
1	Lê Quang Diễn	11	Hải Phòng	"Huyền thoại hồ Núi Cốc" - Phó Đức Phương		—	—
2	Nguyễn Hoàng Vân Trang	13	Hải Phòng	"Quê nhà" - Trần Tiến			
3	Nguyễn Thị Thùy Trang	9	Đắk Lắk	"Lời ru một đời" - Nguyễn Hồng Thuận	—	—	
4	Nguyễn Hải Anh	10	Hanoi	"Born This Way" - Lady Gaga	—	—	
5	Nguyễn Tiến Hiếu	13	Hà Tĩnh	"Hiên ngang" - Anh Tuấn, Karik	—	—	
6	Lê Khánh Linh	9	Thanh Hóa	"Tôi mơ một giấc mơ" - Dương Thụ			
7	Nguyễn Duy Linh	10	Hanoi	"Mẹ" - Phú Quang		—	
8	Trần Tina	14	Ho Chi Minh City	"Uống trà" - Phạm Toàn Thắng			—
9	Đỗ Đức Thịnh	12	Bắc Giang	"Khúc hát sông quê" - Anh Thơ	—	—	—
10	Trần Diệu Linh	10	Hanoi	"Cause I love you" - Noo Phước Thịnh	—	—	—
11	Hồ Thảo Nguyên	10	Đắk Nông	"O mio babbino caro" from Gianni Schicchi			

=== Episode 5 (20 August) ===
Order	Artist	Age	Hometown	Song	Coaches and artists choices		
Order	Artist	Age	Hometown	Song	Noo	Nhi Thắng	Tường
1	Trần Khánh Huyền	12	Thanh Hóa	"Đông cuối" - Phúc Bồ		—	—
2	Bùi Gia Quý	12	Ho Chi Minh City	"Tâm hồn của đá" - Trần Lập	—		
3	Đào Đức Đạt	14	Bắc Kạn	"Đôi chân trần" - Yphon Ksor	—	—	—
4	Đoàn Thị Hà Linh	10	Ninh Bình	"Giấc mơ trưa" - Giáng Son	—	—	—
5	Đào Nguyên Thụy Bình	12	Bến Tre	"Nỗi buồn mẹ tôi" - Cẩm Ly			
6	Đặng Hồng Hải	13	Ho Chi Minh City	"Một đời người, một rừng cây" - Trần Long Ẩn	—		—
7	Nguyễn Lê Thu Hương	9	Thanh Hóa	"Điều không thể mất" - Ngọc Châu	—	—	
8	Nguyễn Ngọc Phương Nhi	13	Ho Chi Minh City	"Nơi ấy" - Hà Okio			
9	Giang Hoàng Lâm	12	Hải Phòng	"Về nghe gió kể" - Hoàng Anh Minh	—		—
10	Lê Băng Giang	11	Hải Phòng	"Giấc mơ của tôi" - Phương Anh		Team full	
11	Chiara Falcone	13	Đà Nẵng	"Send My Love (To Your New Lover)" - Adele	Advanced via online admissions		

== The Battles ==
The 15 contestants in each team are divided into five match-ups, each with three contestants. Each group will perform a pre-rehearsed song on the stage. After going on stage to finish the confrontation song with the coaches, the coaches name one of the three contestants of each group as the winner. After all five matches conclude with five winners and ten losing contestants, each team coach nominates one of the ten losers of their team to go on to the Liveshow round together with five contestants who won their battles. After this round ends, each team has six contestants.

Each coach brought advisors to help them prepare for the battles. Noo Phước Thịnh worked with musician Nguyễn Hải Phong, who was the advisor for team Hiền Thục in The Voice Kids season 1. Team Nhi Thắng's advisor was songwriter/producer Huỳnh Hiền Năng. Vũ Cát Tường's advisor was Hồng Nhung, who was her coach in The Voice of Vietnam.

Colour key

Artist won the Battle and advanced to the Liveshows
Artist lost the Battle but was saved by the coach and advanced to the Liveshows
Artist lost the Battle and was eliminated

Episode	Coach	Order	Winner	Song	Losers	
Episode 6 (August 27)	Đông Nhi & Ông Cao Thắng	1	Nguyễn Kim Anh	"Quê hương Việt Nam" - Anh Khang	Phạm Thị Thu Huệ	Lê Võ Thùy Dung
Episode 6 (August 27)	Vũ Cát Tường	2	Vũ Hoàng Minh	"Nếu tôi được trở lại" - Lưu Hương Giang	Trần Đình Nguyên	Hoàng Minh Chánh
Episode 6 (August 27)	Noo Phước Thịnh	3	Ngyễn Khánh Ngọc	"Đưa cơm cho mẹ đi cày" - Hàn Ngọc Bích/"Mẹ yêu con" - Nguyễn Văn Tý	Phạm Linh Phương	Nguyễn Ngọc Phụng
Episode 6 (August 27)	Đông Nhi & Ông Cao Thắng	4	Trần Ngọc Quang	"I'm in Love with a Monster" - Fifth Harmony	Phan Nguyễn Hà My	Nguyễn Ngọc Hà Chi
Episode 6 (August 27)	Noo Phước Thịnh	5	Lê Băng Giang	"Mái đình làng biển" - Nguyễn Cường/ "Biết ơn chị Võ Thị Sáu" - Nguyễn Đức Toàn/ "Cô gái vót chông"- Anh Thơ	Trần Khánh Huyền	Bùi Vũ Tường Vy
Episode 7 (September 3)	Noo Phước Thịnh	1	Chu Tuấn Ngọc	"Em bé quê" - Phạm Duy/ "Hoa thơm bướm lượn"/ "Người ở người về" (Traditional)	Dương Gia Kiệt	Nguyễn Ngọc Phương Nhi
Episode 7 (September 3)	Đông Nhi & Ông Cao Thắng	2	Vũ Đàm Thùy Dung	"Mừng tuổi mẹ" - Thu Hiền	Huỳnh Thị Hoài Thương	Bùi Gia Quý
Episode 7 (September 3)	Vũ Cát Tường	3	Milana Zavolokina	"Lights" - Ellie Goulding	Nguyễn Hải Anh	Lương Tuyết Nhi
Episode 7 (September 3)	Đông Nhi & Ông Cao Thắng	4	Lê Khánh Linh	"Trong lành những giấc mơ" - Thùy Chi	Nguyễn Thị Như Quỳnh	Nguyễn Lê Hiền Trân
Episode 7 (September 3)	Vũ Cát Tường	5	Đào Nguyên Thụy Bình	"Bèo dạt mây trôi"/ "Lý cây đa" (Traditional)/ "Sa mưa giông' - Bắc Sơn	Nguyễn Hoàng Vân Trang	Phạm Nguyễn Khánh Linh
Episode 8 (September 10)	Vũ Cát Tường	1	Hồ Thảo Nguyên	"Trời Hà Nội xanh" - Khánh Linh	Nguyễn Lê Thu Hương	Nguyễn Thị Thúy Phượng
Episode 8 (September 10)	Noo Phước Thịnh	2	Trần Minh Nguyệt	"Faded" - Alan Walker/ "Unconditionally" - Katy Perry	Nguyễn Duy Linh	Trần Linh Nhi
Episode 8 (September 10)	Vũ Cát Tường	3	Chiara Falcone	"Chợt như giấc mơ" - Võ Hạ Trâm	Nguyễn Thị Thùy Trang	Nguyễn Tiến Hiếu
Episode 8 (September 10)	Noo Phước Thịnh	4	Nguyễn Hoàng Mai Anh	"Nắng có còn xuân" - Đức Trí	Lê Quang Diễn	Trần Tina
Episode 8 (September 10)	Đông Nhi & Ông Cao Thắng	5	Trịnh Nhật Minh	"Thật bất ngờ" - Trúc Nhân	Giang Hoàng Lâm	Đặng Hồng Hải

== Live shows ==
This season of The Voice Kids had format changes. Contestants who were eliminated before the finals have a chance to return to the finale via the new twist "Wildcard". The audience votes for contestants through the voting portal on the website SaoStar.vn. Contestants receiving the highest vote on SaoStar.vn are fourth finalists and compete in the finale along with the Top 3. Wildcard voting closed on early Friday night (22 October 2016). Milana Zavolokina was the Wildcard contestant with 13.32% of the public vote and thus was brought back to the finals.

Color key:

Artist was saved by the Public's votes
Artist was saved by their coach
Artist was originally eliminated but was brought back by the Wildcard
Artist was eliminated

=== Week 1 and 2 (September 17 & 24, 2016) ===
The first nine contestants of the three teams performed together at Liveshow 1. During the night, each team had three contestants. Results were not announced. The following nine contestants of all three teams performed together on Liveshow 2. On that night, each team had three contestants. The results of the contestants were announced at the end of Liveshow 2 in the following manner:

- The top two contestants receiving the highest public vote were automatically sent through the next round
- Two contestants selected by their coach were qualified for the next round
- The remaining two contestants were eliminated

Episode	Coach	Order	Artist	Song	Result
Episode 9 (September 17)	Đông Nhi & Ông Cao Thắng	1	Nguyễn Kim Anh	"Ăn gì đây"- Hòa Minzy	Eliminated
Episode 9 (September 17)	Vũ Cát Tường	2	Hồ Thảo Nguyên	"Bóng cây Kơ-nia"- Thu Minh	Coach's choice
Episode 9 (September 17)	Noo Phước Thịnh	3	Lê Băng Giang	"Độc huyền cầm" - Bảo Lan/ "Thư pháp"- Đan Trường	Public's vote
Episode 9 (September 17)	Vũ Cát Tường	4	Nguyễn Hoàng Vân Trang	"Mùa đông" - Đinh Mạnh Ninh	Eliminated
Episode 9 (September 17)	Vũ Cát Tường	5	Đào Nguyên Thụy Bình	"Nhớ mẹ lý mồ côi"- Phi Nhung	Public's vote
Episode 9 (September 17)	Noo Phước Thịnh	6	Trần Minh Nguyệt	"Papa"- Hồng Nhung	Eliminated
Episode 9 (September 17)	Đông Nhi & Ông Cao Thắng	7	Vũ Đàm Thùy Dung	"Bà tôi" - Ngọc Khuê/ "Huế tình yêu của tôi" - Cẩm Ly/ "Bài ca đất phương Nam" - Phi Nhung	Public's vote
Episode 9 (September 17)	Đông Nhi & Ông Cao Thắng	8	Trịnh Nhật Minh	Mẹ tôi - Trần Tiến	Public's vote
Episode 9 (September 17)	Noo Phước Thịnh	9	Nguyễn Hoàng Mai Anh	"Chiếc áo bà ba" - Cẩm Ly/ "Áo mới Cà Mau" - Phi Nhung/ "Mời anh đến thăm quê em" - Hương Lan	Public's vote
Episode 10 (September 24)	Đông Nhi & Ông Cao Thắng	1	Bùi Gia Quý	"Bước đến bên em"- Trọng Hiếu	Coach's choice
Episode 10 (September 24)	Đông Nhi & Ông Cao Thắng	2	Lê Khánh Linh	"Hồ trên núi" - Phó Đức Phương	Eliminated
Episode 10 (September 24)	Noo Phước Thịnh	3	Chu Tuấn Ngọc	"One day" - Hoàng Tôn	Coach's choice
Episode 10 (September 24)	Đông Nhi & Ông Cao Thắng	4	Trần Ngọc Quang	"Buông"- Bùi Anh Tuấn	Coach's choice
Episode 10 (September 24)	Noo Phước Thịnh	5	Trần Khánh Huyền	"Keep on moving" - Thiều Bảo Trang	Eliminated
Episode 10 (September 24)	Vũ Cát Tường	6	Vũ Hoàng Minh	"Gương thần"- Thanh Bùi	Public's vote
Episode 10 (September 24)	Vũ Cát Tường	7	Milana Zavolokina	"This One's for You" - David Guetta ft. Zara Larsson	Finals Wildcard
Episode 10 (September 24)	Noo Phước Thịnh	8	Nguyễn Khánh Ngọc	"Thị Màu lên chùa" (Traditional)	Coach's choice
Episode 10 (September 24)	Vũ Cát Tường	9	Chiara Falcone	"Stone Cold" - Demi Lovato	Coach's choice

=== Week 3 (October 1) ===
At this live show, 12 contestants performed a solo performance. At the end of the night, two contestants who were selected by the audience and one selected by their coach moved on to the next round. The remaining one contestant was eliminated.

Episode	Coach	Order	Artist	Song	Result
Episode 11 (October 1)	Đông Nhi & Ông Cao Thắng	1	Bùi Gia Quý	"Cha" - Anh Tuấn, Karik	Public's vote
Episode 11 (October 1)	Vũ Cát Tường	2	Chiara Falcone	"Tiếng đàn bầu" - Trọng Tấn	Coach's choice
Episode 11 (October 1)	Noo Phước Thịnh	3	Lê Băng Giang	"Huyền thoại mẹ" - Trịnh Công Sơn/ "Người mẹ của tôi" - Xuân Hồng	Public's vote
Episode 11 (October 1)	Vũ Cát Tường	4	Hồ Thảo Nguyên	"Vì đâu" - Siu Black	Public's vote
Episode 11 (October 1)	Đông Nhi & Ông Cao Thắng	5	Trần Ngọc Quang	"Dòng thời gian" - Nguyễn Hải Phong	Eliminated
Episode 11 (October 1)	Noo Phước Thịnh	6	Chu Tuấn Ngọc	"Thánh Gióng ra trận" - Cao Minh Thu	Eliminated
Episode 11 (October 1)	Vũ Cát Tường	7	Đào Nguyên Thụy Bình	"Đào liễu" (Traditional)	Public's vote
Episode 11 (October 1)	Noo Phước Thịnh	8	Nguyễn Khánh Ngọc	"Tiếng đàn Ta lư" - Huy Thục	Coach's choice
Episode 11 (October 1)	Vũ Cát Tường	9	Vũ Hoàng Minh	"All That She Wants" - Ace of Base/ "Cheri, Cheri Lady" - Modern Talking	Eliminated
Episode 11 (October 1)	Noo Phước Thịnh	10	Nguyễn Hoàng Mai Anh	"Bài ca người nữ tự vệ Sài Gòn" - Phạm Minh Tuấn	Public's vote
Episode 11 (October 1)	Đông Nhi & Ông Cao Thắng	11	Trịnh Nhật Minh	"Can't Take My Eyes Off You" - Frankie Valli	Public's vote
Episode 11 (October 1)	Đông Nhi & Ông Cao Thắng	12	Vũ Đàm Thùy Dung	"Cô gái mở đường"/ "Em đi qua cầu cây" - Cẩm Ly	Coach's choice

=== Week 4 (October 8) ===
Episode	Coach	Order	Artist	Song	Result
Episode 12 (October 1)	Noo Phước Thịnh	1	Lê Băng Giang	"Stronger (What Doesn't Kill You)" - Kelly Clarkson	Eliminated
Episode 12 (October 1)	Đông Nhi & Ông Cao Thắng	2	Vũ Đàm Thùy Dung	"Chị tôi" - Trần Tiến	Eliminated
Episode 12 (October 1)	Vũ Cát Tường	3	Chiara Falcone	"Vết mưa" - Vũ Cát Tường	Eliminated
Episode 12 (October 1)	Noo Phước Thịnh	4	Nguyễn Khánh Ngọc	"Và ta đã thấy mặt trời" - Siu Black	Coach's choice
Episode 12 (October 1)	Vũ Cát Tường	5	Hồ Thảo Nguyên	""Ave Maria"/ "Hallelujah" - Leonard Cohen	Coach's choice
Episode 12 (October 1)	Đông Nhi & Ông Cao Thắng	6	Bùi Gia Quý	"Ai cũng có ngày xưa" - Phan Mạnh Quỳnh	Coach's choice
Episode 12 (October 1)	Noo Phước Thịnh	7	Nguyễn Hoàng Mai Anh	"Đường cong" - Thu Minh	Public's vote
Episode 12 (October 1)	Vũ Cát Tường	8	Đào Nguyên Thụy Bình	"Over the Rainbow" (American Traditional)	Public's vote
Episode 12 (October 1)	Đông Nhi & Ông Cao Thắng	9	Trịnh Nhật Minh	"Bác làm vườn và con chim sâu" - Trúc Nhân	Public's vote

=== Week 5 (October 15, 2017): Semifinals ===
At Liveshow 5, each contestant performed a solo song and a duet song with their teammate. The person with the higher score based on 50% of the audience vote and 50% of the coach vote officially entered the finals. The other one was automatically eliminated.

Episode	Coach	Order	Song	Finalist		Coach/ Public vote %		Eliminated artist		Order	Song
Episode 13 (October 15)	Noo Phước Thịnh	4	"Tìm lại"- Microwave Band	Nguyễn Hoàng Mai Anh	101,42%	50%	50%	98,58%	Nguyễn Khánh Ngọc	2	"Mặt trời dịu êm"- Hồng Nhung
Episode 13 (October 15)	Noo Phước Thịnh	4	"Tìm lại"- Microwave Band	Nguyễn Hoàng Mai Anh	101,42%	51,42%	48,58%	98,58%	Nguyễn Khánh Ngọc	2	"Mặt trời dịu êm"- Hồng Nhung
Episode 13 (October 15)	Đông Nhi & Ông Cao Thắng	5	"Tình ca"- Phạm Duy	Trịnh Nhật Minh	102,17%	50%	50%	97,83%	Bùi Gia Quý	7	"Em bé quê"- Quế Chi
Episode 13 (October 15)	Đông Nhi & Ông Cao Thắng	5	"Tình ca"- Phạm Duy	Trịnh Nhật Minh	102,17%	52,17%	47,83%	97,83%	Bùi Gia Quý	7	"Em bé quê"- Quế Chi
Episode 13 (October 15)	Vũ Cát Tường	1	"Quê hương" - Đỗ Trung Quân	Đào Nguyên Thụy Bình	109,23%	50%	50%	90,77%	Hồ Thảo Nguyên	3	"Mái đình làng biển"- Nguyễn Cường
Episode 13 (October 15)	Vũ Cát Tường	1	"Quê hương" - Đỗ Trung Quân	Đào Nguyên Thụy Bình	109,23%	59,23%	40,77%	90,77%	Hồ Thảo Nguyên	3	"Mái đình làng biển"- Nguyễn Cường

Non-competition performances
Order	Performer	Song
13.1	Team Noo (Nguyễn Khánh Ngọc & Nguyễn Hoàng Mai Anh)	"Giếng làng"/ "Ôi quê tôi"- Lê Minh Sơn
13.2	Team Nhi Thắng (Bùi Gia Quý & Trịnh Nhật Minh)	"Taxi"- Thu Minh
13.3	Team Vũ Cát Tường (Đào Nguyên Thụy Bình & Hồ Thảo Nguyên)	"Em đi giữa biển vàng" - Bùi Đình Thảo/ "Hạt gạo làng ta" - Trần Đăng Khoa
13.4	The Top 6	"Miền Trung Mùa Bão Lũ" (In dedication to the Central of Vietnam who suffered flood)

=== Week 6 and 7 (October 22 & 29): The Finals ===
On Liveshow 6, the 3 best contestant of three teams performed a solo song and a duet song with a guest performer. The audience votes were then announced from high to low. However, Liveshow 6 was a non-elimination night and all three contestants came to the finale together with one contestant who was eliminated but won the Wildcard after receiving the most votes from the websites Saostar and YouTube. The results of Liveshow 6 were added together with the results of the finale to find the winner of the show.

In the final round, four contestants (the Top 3 and one contestant who was eliminated but was brought back by the audience) performed two songs: one solo and one duet with their coach. The contestant with the highest number of votes was crowned the champion of The Voice Kids 2016.

Coach	Artist	Episode 14- Live Top 3 Performances (October 22)				Episode 15- The Grand Finale (October 29)				Result
Coach	Artist	Order	Solo song	Order	Duet song (with Guest performers)	Order	Finalist's single	Order	Duet song (with Coach)	Result
Đông Nhi & Ông Cao Thắng	Trịnh Nhật Minh	1	"Arirang" (Traditional Korean song, Vietnamese lyric: Lưu Thiên Hương)	4	"Phật bà nghìn mắt nghìn tay"- An Thuyên (with Hương Tràm)	4	"Phù thuỷ sợ ma" (Traditional)/ "Thành phố miền quan họ" - Nguyễn Cường	6	"We belong together"- Đông Nhi	Winner (36,09%)
Noo Phước Thịnh	Nguyễn Hoàng Mai Anh	2	"Quê em mùa nước lũ"- Phương Mỹ Chi/ "Chị đi tìm em"- Như Quỳnh	5	"Ngẫu hứng sông Hồng"- Trần Tiến (with Hồng Nhung)	3	"Nổi lửa lên em" - Huy Thục	8	"Cặp ba lá"/ "Chuồn chuồn ớt" - Lê Minh Sơn	Third place (25.94%)
Vũ Cát Tường	Đào Nguyên Thụy Bình	3	"Khao khát một lời ru" (Traditional)	6	"Ngọn lửa cao nguyên"- Siu Black (with Phương Thanh)	2	"Hát từ cội nguồn" (Traditional)	7	"Tôi"- Vũ Cát Tường	Runner-up (32,65%)
Vũ Cát Tường	Milana Zavolokina	—				1	"Ô mê ly"- Ánh Tuyết	5	"Belief"- Vũ Cát Tường	Fourth place (5,32%)

Non-competition performances
Order	Performer	Song
14.1	Nguyễn Khánh Ngọc, Hồ Thảo Nguyên & Bùi Gia Quý	"Sẽ chiến thắng"

== Elimination chart ==
Artist's info

- Artist from Team Noo Phước Thịnh
- Artist from Team Đông Nhi & Ông Cao Thắng
- Artist from Team Vũ Cát Tường

Result details

- Winner
- Runner-up
- Third place
- Fourth Place
- Saved by Wildcard
- Artist was saved by the public
- Artist was saved by their coach
- Artist was eliminated

Live show results per week
Artist	Week 1+2	Week 3	Week 4	Semi-Finals	Finals
Trịnh Nhật Minh	Safe	Safe	Safe	Safe	Winner
Đào Nguyên Thụy Bình	Safe	Safe	Safe	Safe	Runner-up
Nguyễn Hoàng Mai Anh	Safe	Safe	Safe	Safe	3rd Place
Milana Zavolokina	Eliminated	Eliminated (Week 1)		Back via Wildcard	4th Place
Hồ Thảo Nguyên	Safe	Safe	Safe	Eliminated	Eliminated (Semi-Finals)
Bùi Gia Quý	Safe	Safe	Safe	Eliminated	Eliminated (Semi-Finals)
Nguyễn Khánh Ngọc	Safe	Safe	Safe	Eliminated	Eliminated (Semi-Finals)
Vũ Đàm Thùy Dung	Safe	Safe	Eliminated	Eliminated (Week 4)	
Chiara Falcone	Safe	Safe	Eliminated	Eliminated (Week 4)	
Lê Băng Giang	Safe	Safe	Eliminated	Eliminated (Week 4)	
Chu Tuấn Ngọc	Safe	Eliminated	Eliminated (Week 3)		
Trần Ngọc Quang	Safe	Eliminated	Eliminated (Week 3)		
Vũ Hoàng Minh	Safe	Eliminated	Eliminated (Week 3)		
Trần Minh Nguyệt	Eliminated	Eliminated (Week 1+2)			
Trần Khánh Huyền	Eliminated	Eliminated (Week 1+2)			
Nguyễn Kim Anh	Eliminated	Eliminated (Week 1+2)			
Lê Khánh Linh	Eliminated	Eliminated (Week 1+2)			
Nguyễn Hoàng Vân Trang	Eliminated	Eliminated (Week 1+2)			
