= Junior MasterChef Vietnam season 1 =

Junior MasterChef Vietnam
- Season 1
- No. of episodes: 13

Release
- Original network: VTV3
- Original release: 2 October – 25 December 2016

Season 1 of the Vietnamese competitive reality television series Junior MasterChef Vietnam premiered on VTV3 on 2 October 2016.

== Top 12 ==
Contestant	Age	Hometown	Status	Winnings
Đinh Thanh Hải	13	Ho Chi Minh City	Winner 25 December	8
Nguyễn Danh Đức Hải	13	Hanoi	Runner-Up 25 December	5
Vũ Nguyễn Minh Anh	13	Ho Chi Minh City	Eliminated 25 December	6
Phạm Bảo Anh	14	Hanoi	Eliminated 25 December	3
Lê Công Quốc Huân	12	Ho Chi Minh City	Eliminated 11 December	3
Nguyễn Phương Linh	13	Hanoi	Eliminated 4 December	3
Nguyễn Hoàng Hải	10	Ho Chi Minh City	Eliminated 27 November	2
Nguyễn Lê Hiền Anh	10	Hanoi	Eliminated 20 November	1
Trần Minh Hoàng	12	Quảng Ninh	Eliminated 30 October	1
Trần Gia Huy	9	Ho Chi Minh City	Eliminated 30 October	0
Trần Thuận Thành	14	Ho Chi Minh City	Eliminated 23 October	0
Nguyễn Đồ Vân Anh	14	Ho Chi Minh City	Eliminated 23 October	0

== Elimination Table ==
Place	Contestant	Episode															
Place	Contestant	4		5		6		7	8		9	10		11		13	
1	Thanh Hải	IN	WIN	WIN	IN	IN	WIN	WIN	IN	IN	WIN	HIGH	WIN	IN	IN	WIN	WINNER
2	Đức Hải	WIN	IN	IN	WIN	IN	WIN	PT	HIGH	IN	WIN	IN	IN	IN	IN	WIN	RUNNER-UP
3-4	Minh Anh	IN	IN	WIN	IN	IN	WIN	WIN	WIN	IMM	WIN	HIGH	IN	WIN	IMM	ELIM	
3-4	Bảo Anh	IN	IN	IN	IN	IN	WIN	PT	HIGH	WIN	WPT	IN	LOW	IN	IN	ELIM	
5	Quốc Huân	IN	IN	WIN	IN	IN	WIN	PT	IN	IN	PT	WIN	IN	IN	ELIM		
6	Phương Linh	HIGH	IN	WIN	IN	IN	WIN	WIN	IN	LOW	PT	IN	ELIM				
7	Hoàng Hải	IN	IN	IN	IN	IN	WIN	WIN	IN	LOW	ELIM						
8	Hiền Anh	IN	LOW	IN	IN	IN	WIN	PT	IN	ELIM							
9-10	Gia Huy	HIGH	IN	IN	ELIM												
9-10	Minh Hoàng	IN	LOW	WIN	ELIM												
11-12	Thuận Thành	IN	ELIM														
11-12	Vân Anh	IN	ELIM														

(WINNER) This cook won the competition.
(RUNNER-UP) This cook finished in second place.
(WIN) The cook won the individual challenge (Mystery Box or Elimination Test).
(WIN) The cook was on the winning team in the Team Challenge and directly advanced to the next round.
(WIN) The cook was on the winning team in the Team Challenge, but still going to the Pressure Test, and advanced.
(WPT) The cook won the Pressure Test.
(HIGH) The cook was one of the top entries in an individual challenge, but did not win.
(PT) The cook was on the losing team in the Team Challenge, competed in the Pressure Test, and advanced.
(IN) The cook was not selected as a top or bottom entry in an individual challenge.
(IN) The cook was not selected as a top or bottom entry in a Team Challenge.
(IMM) The cook did not have to compete in that round of the competition and was safe from elimination.
(IMM) The cook was selected by the Mystery Box Challenge winner and did not have to compete in the Elimination Test.
(LOW) The cook was one of the bottom entries in an individual challenge, and was the last person to advance.
(LOW) The cook was one of the bottom entries in a Team Challenge, and their team was last to advance.
(LOW) The cook was on the losing team in the Team Challenge, and the only person from their team to advance.
(LOW) The cook was one of the bottom entries but was not the last person to advance.
(ELIM) The cook was eliminated.

== Episode ==
No. overall	No. in season	Title	Original release date
1	1	"The Green Planet (Audition 1)"	2 October 2016
Group 1: Quốc Huân, Mai Ngọc, Thảo Ngọc, Linh Đan, Trọng Hiền, Thanh Hải, Minh Anh, Vân Anh and Thu Thủy.; Top 12: Quốc Huân, Thanh Hải, Minh Anh; Eliminated: Mai Ngọc, Thảo Ngọc, Linh Đan, Trọng Hiền, Vân Anh and Thu Thủy.
2	2	"World in My Eyes (Audition 2)"	9 October 2016
Group 2: Hoàng Hải, Thuận Thành, Gia Huy, Huyền Giang, Tuyết Nhi, Minh Hiền, Minh Phương and Bảo Châu; Top 12: Hoàng Hải, Thuận Thành, Gia Huy; Eliminated: Huyền Giang, Tuyết Nhi, Minh Hiền, Minh Phương and Bảo Châu
3	3	"Love comes from the delicious food (Audition 3)"	16 October 2016
Group 3: Hiền Anh, Bảo Anh, Đức Hải, Phương Linh, Minh Hoàng, Tùng Lâm, Hoàng Linh, Nhật Anh, Danh Thắng.; Top 12: Hiền Anh, Bảo Anh and Đức Hải; Eliminated: Phương Linh, Minh Hoàng, Tùng Lâm, Hoàng Linh, Nhật Anh, Danh Thắng.; Wild card: Vân Anh, Phương Linh and Minh Hoàng
4	4	"Cooked Pork (Top 12)"	23 October 2016
Mystery Box Challenge: For the first Mystery Box challenge, the top 12 was to cook a special food. Gia Huy, Đừc Hải, and Phương Linh had the best dishes, with Đức Hải declared as the winner.; Challenge Winner: Đức Hải; Elimination Challenge: Đức Hải chose pork for the challenge. Thanh Hải was the winner and will be the captain in the upcoming team challenge. The bottom dishes belong to Hiền Anh, Minh Hoàng, Thuận Thành, Vân Anh. Thuận Thành and Vân Anh were eliminated.; Winner: Thanh Hải; Bottom four: Hiền Anh, Minh Hoàng, Thuận Thành, Vân Anh; Eliminated: Thuận Thành, Vân Anh
5	5	"Halloween (Top 10)"	30 October 2016
Team Challenge: The Blue team consisted of Thanh Hải (team captain), Quốc Huân, Minh Anh, Minh Hoàng, Phương Linh. The Red Team consisted of Gia Huy, Hoàng Hải, Bảo Anh, Hiền Anh (team captain), Đức Hải. According to the draw, the Blue Team will cook a menu of "honey chicken leg with pumpkin sauce" and "pudding" for desserts. Red team cooked "lamb chops with black pepper sauce" and "sweet rice pancake roll apple" for desserts. Each team has 10 minutes to choose the ingredients and 90 minutes to cook two dishes for 15 diners, who were the special judges of the night.; Team Challenge Winners: Đức Hải, Quốc Huân, Minh Anh, Minh Hoàng, Phương Linh; Pressure Test: Despite being the winner of the Team Challenge, the Blue Team was not safe and had to participate in the pressure test. Accordingly, before making challenge, the top 10 was the trio of judges Jack Lee, Tịnh Hải and Alain Nguyễn 3 spring rolls, which is up beer, seafood and lettuce Gone Gone Sour Shrimp boiled meat type Central. As the winner, the Blue Team members received a significant advantage in this challenge, which is the right to choose 1 of 3 rolls to make. Meanwhile, the Red Team members had to cook all 3 rolls in 60 minutes.; Eliminated: Gia Huy, Minh Hoàng
6	6	"Yelling at the Tag Team (Top 8)"	6 November 2016
Tag Team Challenge:
7	7	"Breakfast disaster (Top 8)"	13 November 2016
Team Challenge: Pressure Test :
8	8	"Around the world panic (Top 8)"	20 November 2016
9	9	"Top 7"	27 November 2016
10	10	"Top 6"	4 December 2016
11	11	"Top 5"	11 December 2016
12	12	"Top 4 Finale"	18 December 2016
13	13	"Top 4 Finale (Part 2)"	25 December 2016
