= Đông Nhi =

Vietnamese singer (born 1988)

- Born: Mai Hồng Ngọc; 13 October 1988 (age 38); Hanoi, Vietnam
- Occupation: Singer
- Height: 1.66 m (5 ft 5 in)
- Spouse: Ông Cao Thắng (m. 2019)
- Children: 2
- Musical career
- Genre: V-pop
- Instruments: Vocals; piano; guitar
- Years active: 2008–
- Label: 6th Sense Entertainment JSC

Mai Hồng Ngọc (born 13 October 1988), also known by her stage name Đông Nhi, is a Vietnamese singer. She studied at the Marie Curie High School in Ho Chi Minh City. Her first projects, such as The First Step (2009), The Singer (2012), Sau Moi Giac Mo (2012), and I Wanna Dance (2013), have won several awards.

During her career, Đông Nhi has won various awards; she was awarded Favorite Female Singer at the Zing Music Awards six times in a row from 2011 to 2016, Ballad Female Singer at the Golden Apricot Blossom Awards three times in a row, Asia's Best Vietnamese Singer from MAMA, South East Asia's Best Singer at the 2016 MTV EMAs, and nominated twice at the Cong Hien Awards. Other recognition includes the Big Apple Music Awards (BAMA) and the Vietnam Labor Bureau for her devotion.

Đông Nhi won the first season of The Remix in 2015, and was the coach of The Voice Kids of Vietnam in 2016 and The Voice Vietnam in 2017. She has been part of marketing campaigns with Sunsilk, Samsung, Maybelline, Audi Vietnam, Nescafe, Pepsi, KFC, Nokia X, and others.

== Career ==
Đông Nhi announced her hiatus in 2009. During her hiatus, it was rumored that she was pregnant, but she said it was only a rumor.

In September 2011, Đông Nhi released her EP The Singer, a collaboration with some Vietnamese musicians. She won Best Female Singer at the Zing Music Awards, and The Singer was ranked in the Top 10 Album of the Year.

In 2012, she voiced over in The Lorax with TV host Thanh Bach. At the end of April, Đông Nhi debuted her music video for "Sau Mỗi Giấc Mơ", in which 80% of scenes were underwater. The song and music video topped some Vietnamese music charts; subsequently, Đông Nhi won Favorite Female Singer at the Zing Music Awards. At the end of 2012, she held a mini concert with the Bo tu hoan hao cast.

In 2013, she hosted Dancing with the Stars. She also stopped working with her manager Dang Phuong and signed with Ong Cao Thang's 6th Sense Entertainment. Due to her changed image, she had a breakthrough with EDM. Along with this success, she still gained successes for her pop songs, namely "Tim Về" and "Xoa". She won several awards and started to build a fanbase; she sponsored brands.

In 2014, Đông Nhi released her second album I Wanna Dance, featuring pop-electronic songs. The album's lead single, "I Wanna Dance", topped many music charts in Vietnam, as well as Chinese and Spanish charts. The song won Favorite Pop - Electronic Song at the Zing Music Awards 2014. Đông Nhi also won Favorite Female Singer for the fourth time. At the 19th Golden Apricot Blossom Awards, she won Favorite Ballad Singer.

In February 2015, at the 20th Golden Apricot Blossom Awards, she won Favorite Ballad Singer. In 2015, she competed in the first season of The Remix, which she won on May 3. Here, she also performed her single "Stop Loving You", which topped some music charts.

On May 15, 2015, she released the music video for "Vi Ai Vi Anh". The video received more than one million views and topped the Zing MP3 chart upon release.

On January 22, 2016, at the 21st Golden Apricot Blossom Awards, she won Favorite Ballad Female Singer for the third consecutive time and Top 10 Artists of the Year. On January 25, she was enlisted in the 30 Under 30 list by Forbes Vietnam under her real name.

== Personal life ==
In November 2019, she married singer Ông Cao Thắng in a wedding attended by public figures. The following year, in October, she gave birth to a baby girl named Winnie. In August 2024, the couple had another daughter.

== Public image ==
On April 19, 2008, Đông Nhi's fanbase was established under the name Potatoes (shortened as Po) which is still active. Her fan club helped her win the BFF contest and become the first Vietnamese singer to own "a star".

== Discography ==
=== Albums ===
Title	Album details
The First Step	Released: September 17, 2010; Label: Viết Tân, Tinu Production; Format: Streaming, CD, DVD
I Wanna Dance	Released: January 1, 2014; Label: 6th Sense Entertainment, Viết Tân; Format: Streaming, CD, DVD
Ten on Ten	Released: December 9, 2018; Label: 6th Sense Entertainment, Universal Music Group; Format: Streaming, CD

=== Extended plays ===
Title	Details
The Singer	Released: September 12, 2011; Label: Viết Tân, Dihavina, Tinu Production, On Media, Việt Giải Trí; Format: Streaming, CD
Xin anh đừng	Released: April 14, 2017; Label: 6th Sense Entertainment; Format: Streaming, CD

=== Singles ===
==== As lead artist ====
Title	Year	Ref.	Album
"Chàng Baby Milo"	2008		—N/a
"Đu quay tình yêu"	2008		—N/a
"Khóc" (featuring Huỳnh Thanh Bình)	2008		The First Step
"Lời thú tội ngọt ngào"	2008		The First Step
"Bối rối"	2008		The First Step
"Bước"	2008		—N/a
"Khi mưa"	2008		The First Step
"Nhất quỷ nhì ma"	2009		—N/a
"Mưa nước mắt"	2009		—N/a
"Chôn giấu"	2009		—N/a
"Chỉ thế thôi"	2009		—N/a
"30 ngày yêu"	2009		—N/a
"Ngọt ngào"	2010		—N/a
"Ác mộng của những giấc mơ"	2010		—N/a
"Gương"	2010		—N/a
"Tìm anh"	2010		—N/a
"Lạnh lùng"	2010		—N/a
"Khi mưa"	2010		—N/a
"Từng thuộc về nhau"	2011		—N/a
"Nhớ mãi nụ cười xinh"	2011		—N/a
"Cho em một lần yêu"	2011		The Singer
"Có những yêu thương nào"	2011		The Singer
"Sau mỗi giấc mơ"	2012		—N/a
"Tìm về"	2013		—N/a
"Xoá"	2013		I Wanna Dance
"I Wanna Dance (Cần một ai đó)"	2013		I Wanna Dance
"Ngõ vắng"	2013		I Wanna Dance
"Giận lòng"	2014		I Wanna Dance
"Cất giấu kí ức"	2014		—N/a
"Lắng nghe tim em"	2014		—N/a
"Đừng bao giờ nói yêu em"	2014		—N/a
"Lắng nghe tim em"	2014		—N/a
"Bad Boy"	2014		—N/a
"Shake the Rhythm"	2015		—N/a
"Vì ai vì anh (Stop Loving You)"	2015		—N/a
"Tóc nâu môi trầm"	2015		—N/a
"Hot"	2015		—N/a
"Boom Boom" (featuring với Mei)	2015		—N/a
"Pink Girl"	2016		—N/a
"I Wanna Be Your Love"	2016		—N/a
"My Sunshine"	2016		—N/a
"Trách ai bây giờ"	2016		—N/a
"Cảm ơn (We Belong Together)"	2016		—N/a
"Love Me Too"	2017		—N/a
"Xin anh đừng"	2017		Xin anh đừng
"Sẽ không quay về" (featuring Anh Tú)	2017		—N/a
"Còn nơi đó chờ em"	2017		—N/a
"Sao chẳng thể vì em"	2017		—N/a
"Cô Ba Sài Gòn"	2017		—N/a
"Xin lỗi anh quá phiền"	2018		Ten on Ten
"Giả vờ say"	2018		Ten on Ten
"Gọi em đi"	2018		Ten on Ten
"Ngày đôi ta là của nhau" (với Ông Cao Thắng)	2019		—N/a
"Hôm nay mình cưới" (với Ông Cao Thắng)	2019		—N/a
"Yêu là cưới" (với Ông Cao Thắng)	2019		—N/a
"Khi con là mẹ"	2020		—N/a

==== As featured artist ====
Title	Year	Ref.	Album
"Cho nhau lối đi riêng (Fallin' Apart)" (Hoàng Thùy Linh featuring Đông Nhi)	2010		Hoàng Thùy Linh
"Nghe này chàng trai (Listen Boy)" (Hoàng Thùy Linh featuring Đông Nhi)	2010		Hoàng Thùy Linh
"Leave Me Alone" (Bảo Anh featuring Đông Nhi)	2016		
