= Stardom (album) =

Studio album by Vũ Cát Tường
- Released: October 18, 2018
- Genres: Pop; soul; R&B; electropop
- Length: 38:29
- Labels: UMG, The Little Prince Entertainment
- Producers: Lưu Thiên Hương; Vũ Cát Tường

Vũ Cát Tường chronology
Giải mã (2014)	Stardom (2018)	Inner Me (2019)

Singles from Stardom
- 1. "Leader" Released: October 2, 2018

Stardom is a second studio album by Vũ Cát Tường, released on October 18, 2018 after 3 years since her debut album Giải mã. The album remarked a whole new chapter after 5 years of Vũ Cát Tường as a professional singer-songwriter and record producer. The album reflects various slices of the artist's personality that Vũ Cát Tường has accumulated in the music and life. "Leader" was released as a single in October 2018.

The album was written in pop, neo soul, R&B, electropop, EDM, hip hop and ballad. This is the first album of Vietnamese artist distributed by Universal Music Group globally. Universal Music Group and Tường accompanied in the promotion campaign in Singapore, performing in the famous Fashion Show Council of Asean Fashion Designer in Malaysia.

== Track listing ==
No.	Title	Songwriter	Music producer	Arranger	Vocal producer	Mix & master	Length
1	Leader	Vũ Cát Tường	Lưu Thiên Hương, Vũ Cát Tường	Naijik, Vũ Cát Tường	Benjamin James	Michael Choi	3:10
2	Stardom	Vũ Cát Tường	Lưu Thiên Hương, Vũ Cát Tường	Tín Lê, Michael Choi	Benjamin James	Michael Choi	3:55
3	Be A Fool	Vũ Cát Tường	Lưu Thiên Hương, Vũ Cát Tường	Nguyễn Thanh Bình	Benjamin James	Michael Choi	3:55
4	Nobody	Vũ Cát Tường	Lưu Thiên Hương, Vũ Cát Tường	Naijik, Vũ Cát Tường	Benjamin James	Michael Choi	5:26
5	One Second	Vũ Cát Tường	Lưu Thiên Hương, Vũ Cát Tường	Naijik	Benjamin James	Michael Choi	3:57
6	San Francisco	Vũ Cát Tường	Lưu Thiên Hương, Vũ Cát Tường	Andy Trần, Nguyễn Thanh Bình	Benjamin James	Michael Choi	3:47
7	If	Vũ Cát Tường	Lưu Thiên Hương, Vũ Cát Tường	Nguyễn Thanh Bình	Benjamin James	Michael Choi	4:15
8	Gucci in Town	Vũ Cát Tường	Lưu Thiên Hương, Vũ Cát Tường	Naijik	Benjamin James	Michael Choi	4:17
9	This Love	Vũ Cát Tường	Lưu Thiên Hương, Vũ Cát Tường	Andy Trần	Benjamin James	Michael Choi	4:17
10	The Party Song	Vũ Cát Tường	Lưu Thiên Hương, Vũ Cát Tường	Naijik	Benjamin James	Michael Choi	3:23

== Accolades ==
Award	Category	Result
Keeng Young Awards	Album của năm	Won
Dedication Music Award	Album của năm	Nominated
