= Jennifer Pham =

Jennifer Phạm
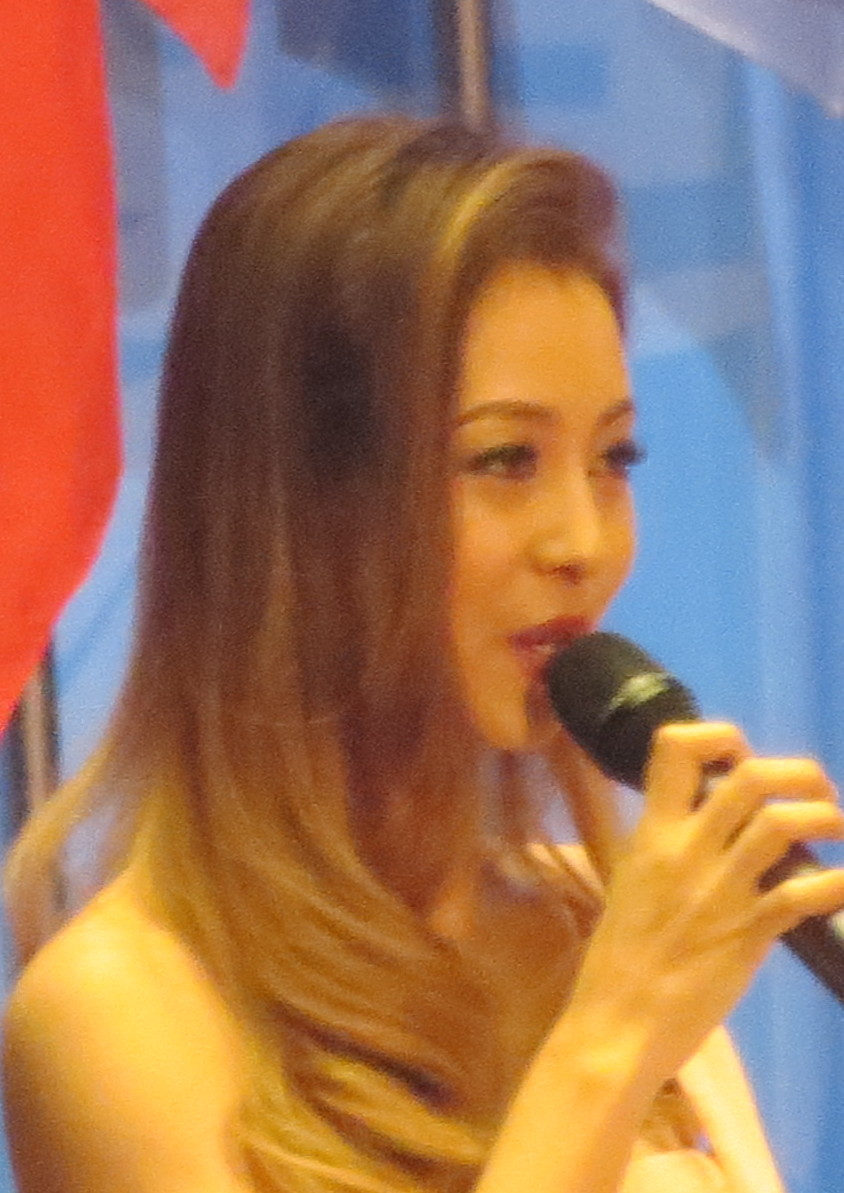
- Born: Phạm Vũ Phượng Hoàng; 3 July 1985 (age 41); Ho Chi Minh City, Vietnam
- Modeling information
- Height: 1.72 m (5 ft 8 in)
- Hair color: Black
- Eye color: Brown

Jennifer Pham (Vietnamese: Phạm Vũ Phượng Hoàng, born on 3 July 1985,) achieved fame by winning many beauty pageant titles. She was crowned Miss Vietnam USA runner-up 2004, Vietnamese American Top Model 2005, Miss Vietnam Southern California 2006 and Miss Asia USA 2006. She has been involved in numerous philanthropy works throughout the US and Asian countries.

On July 25, 2007, she married well-known Vietnamese singer Quang Dũng, with whom she co-starred in the film Leaves of Time (Những Chiếc Lá Thời Gian), at the Sofitel hotel in Ho Chi Minh City, Vietnam. The couple celebrated their wedding in the United States on September 21, 2007, and are expecting their first child. However, she and Quang Dũng have been separated since 2009 and have been alternating care for their son, Bảo Nam (An Nam) who was 5 years old at the time of their separation.

In 2012, Pham got married with businessman Nguyen Duc Hai, with whom she has 3 children, the couple currently lives in Hanoi.
