= The Voice Kids of Vietnam season 7 =

The Voice Kids of Vietnam
- Season 7
- Hosted by: Gil Lê; Khả Ngân
- Judges: Dương Cầm; Hương Giang; Ali Hoàng Dương; Lưu Thiên Hương; Dương Khắc Linh; Phạm Quỳnh Anh
- Winner: Kiều Minh Tâm
- Winning coach: Ali Hoàng Dương & Lưu Thiên Hương
- Runner-up: Nguyễn Đoàn Chấn Quốc

Release
- Original network: VTV3
- Original release: July 20 – October 26, 2019

Season chronology
- ← Previous; Season 6

The seventh season of The Voice Kids of Vietnam – Giọng hát Việt nhí began on 20 July 2019 on VTV3. All three duo coaches and the main host did not return, leaving the panel to be entirely renewed this season. On 12 June 2019, it was announced that former host and The Voice season 4 Ali Hoàng Dương would return, this time as a coach alongside former music executive Lưu Thiên Hương as a new duo coach; whereas former coach Dương Khắc Linh would return with singer Phạm Quỳnh Anh. Musician Dương Cầm and 2018 Miss International Queen Hương Giang joined the show as a new duo coach, while actresses Gil Lê and Khả Ngân also debuted as hosts. The previous season's coach, Hồ Hoài Anh, once again became the show's music executive.

== Teams ==
Color key

- Winner
- Runner-up
- Third place
- Fourth place
- Fifth place
- Eliminated in the Playoffs
- Eliminated in the Knockout rounds
- Stolen in the Battle rounds
- Eliminated in the Battle rounds

Coaches	Top 36 artists				
Dương Cầm & Hương Giang					
Dương Cầm & Hương Giang	Nguyễn Đoàn Chấn Quốc	Nguyễn Ngọc Bảo Hân	Võ Nguyên Ngọc Nhi	Nguyễn Khánh Vy	Nguyễn Thị Ngọc Ánh
Dương Cầm & Hương Giang	Phạm Thị Trâm Anh	Kim Jae Bin	~~Vũ Linh Đan~~	~~Huỳnh Phạm Thanh Tâm~~	~~Nguyễn Hồng Ngọc~~
Dương Cầm & Hương Giang	~~Hoàng Tấn Lộc~~	Huỳnh Thị Tố Uyên	Bùi Ngọc Ánh	Trần Thị Gia Hân	
Ali Hoàng Dương & Lưu Thiên Hương					
Ali Hoàng Dương & Lưu Thiên Hương	Kiều Minh Tâm	Nguyễn Đỗ Khánh An	Đào Huỳnh Minh Châu	Trần Hiểu Minh	Nguyễn Đỗ Thành Nhân
Ali Hoàng Dương & Lưu Thiên Hương	Nguyễn Hồng Ngọc	Hoàng Tấn Lộc	~~Kim Jae Bin~~	~~Võ Nguyên Ngọc Nhi~~	Lê Ngọc Thảo Lam
Ali Hoàng Dương & Lưu Thiên Hương	Bùi Vũ Kim Anh	Lê Minh Ngọc	Trịnh Ngọc Thúy Nga	Nguyễn Hoàng Nhã Thy	
Dương Khắc Linh & Phạm Quỳnh Anh					
Dương Khắc Linh & Phạm Quỳnh Anh	Vũ Linh Đan	Ngô Minh Hằng	Lương Trương Quỳnh Anh	Nguyễn Đức Khôi	Huỳnh Phạm Thanh Tâm
Dương Khắc Linh & Phạm Quỳnh Anh	Vương Hồng Thúy	Trần Thị Diệp Nhi	Trần Nguyễn Quang Vũ	Nguyễn Trần Nguyên Xuân	Nguyễn Thị Yến Nhi
Dương Khắc Linh & Phạm Quỳnh Anh	Võ Khánh Ngọc	Trần Thị Vân Anh	Đào Thái Bình An	Châu Sở Hân	
Note: Italicized names are stolen contestants (names struck through within former teams). Bold names are Wildcard contestant who was previously eliminated but was brought back to the Semifinals or Finals.

== Blind auditions ==
Filming for the blind auditions began on June 12, 2019. The team sizes were trimmed down to 12 per team. Each coach has the length of the contestant's performance to choose them for their team. If more than two coaches want the same contestant, the contestant will choose which team they want to join. The blind auditions end when all teams are full.

The "Block" twist returned for the second time, this season the number of available block is raised to two for each coach in entire blind audition and when the blocked coach press his or her button to turn, the chair does not turn around. In a new twist, contestants can "protect" the blocked coach and still pick that team, but the blocked coach would fall into The Frozen state in the next performance and would not be able to press the button in that performance. Each coach has only one "Breaking The Block" per audition.

Color key

Coach hit his or her "TÔI CHỌN BẠN" (I WANT YOU) button
Artist defaulted to a coach's team
Artist elected a coach's team
Artist was eliminated with no coach pressing their button
Coach gained the "Breaking the Block"
Coach fall into the Frozen state
Coach pressed the "I WANT YOU" button, but was blocked by Dương Cầm & Hương Giang from getting the artist
Coach pressed the "I WANT YOU" button, but was blocked by Ali & Lưu Thiên Hương from getting the artist
Coach pressed the "I WANT YOU" button, but was blocked by Khắc Linh & Quỳnh Anh from getting the artist

=== Episode 1 (20 July) ===
Order	Artist	Age	Hometown	Song	Coaches and artists choices		
Order	Artist	Age	Hometown	Song	Dương Cầm & Hương Giang	Ali & Lưu Thiên Hương	Khắc Linh & Quỳnh Anh
1	Nguyễn Thị Yến Nhi	13	Hai Phong	"Có em chờ" by Min	—		
2	Huỳnh Phạm Thanh Tâm	14	Huế	"Thanh xuân" by Da Lab		—	
3	Trần Thị Diệp Nhi	11	Nghệ An	"Hôm nay tôi buồn" by Phùng Khánh Linh	—	—	
4	Phạm Anh Kiệt	12	Đồng Nai	"Tình cha" by Ngọc Sơn	—	—	—
5	Hoàng Tấn Lộc	14	Da Nang	"Tiếng đàn bầu" by Trọng Tấn			
6	Võ Khánh Ngọc	11	Ho Chi Minh City	"Cô Ba Sài Gòn" by Đông Nhi		—	
7	Nguyễn Thị Ngọc Ánh	14	Bình Phước	"Về đi em" by Hà Anh Tuấn			
8	Kim Jae Bin	12	Bình Dương	"Và tôi hát" by Grey-D			
9	Phạm Thị Trâm Anh		Thanh Hóa	"Trở lại tuổi thơ" by Mỹ Linh		—	
10	Ngô Minh Hằng	7	Ho Chi Minh City	"Không thể và có thể" by Thanh Lam			

=== Episode 2 (27 July) ===
Order	Artist	Age	Hometown	Song	Coaches and artists choices		
Order	Artist	Age	Hometown	Song	Dương Cầm & Hương Giang	Ali & Lưu Thiên Hương	Khắc Linh & Quỳnh Anh
1	Trần Nguyễn Quang Vũ	15	Ho Chi Minh City	"We Are the Rising Kings" by Rhymastic	—		
2	Trần Hiểu Minh	11	Quảng Ninh	"Đào liễu" (Traditional)			—
3	Nguyễn Đỗ Khánh An	13	Hanoi	"Lớn rồi còn khóc nhè" by Trúc Nhân	—		
4	Nguyễn Hoàng Nhã Thy	12	Bình Dương	"Bà tôi" by Ngọc Khuê	—		—
5	Lê Minh Ngọc		Hanoi	"Uống trà" by Phạm Toàn Thắng			
6	Đào Huỳnh Minh Châu	10	Bình Định	"Gánh mẹ" by Quách Beem			
7	Nguyễn Đoàn Chấn Quốc	11	An Giang	"Chảy đi sông ơi" by Phó Đức Phương		—	
8	Nguyễn Ngọc Duyên Khuê	12	Hậu Giang	"Huế tình yêu của tôi" by Quang Lê	—	—	—
9	Huỳnh Thị Tố Uyên	14	Ho Chi Minh City	"Me!" by Taylor Swift & Brendon Urie		—	
10	Nguyễn Đức Khôi	13	Hanoi	"Mưa hồng" by Trịnh Công Sơn			

=== Episode 3 (03 August) ===
Order	Artist	Age	Hometown	Song	Coaches and artists choices		
Order	Artist	Age	Hometown	Song	Dương Cầm & Hương Giang	Ali & Lưu Thiên Hương	Khắc Linh & Quỳnh Anh
1	Lương Trương Quỳnh Anh	13	Ho Chi Minh City	"Điệu buồn phương Nam" by Phi Nhung	—	—	
2	Võ Nguyên Ngọc Nhi	10	Ho Chi Minh City	"Rock Sài Gòn" by MTV Band	—		
3	Bùi Ngọc Ánh	13	Ho Chi Minh City	"Thơ tình của núi" by Tân Nhàn		—	
4	Bùi Gia Bảo	12	Ho Chi Minh City	"Nếu như một ngày" by Hoàng Tôn	—	—	—
5	Nguyễn Khánh Vy	10	Nghệ An	"Nghe mưa" by Mỹ Linh		—	
6	Vương Hồng Thúy	10	Hanoi	"Đi đâu để thấy hoa bay" by Nguyễn Hoàng Dũng			
7	Trương Nguyễn Mạnh Cường	12	Đồng Nai	"Nước mắt mẹ hiền" by Ngọc Sơn	—	—	—
8	Lê Ngọc Thảo Lam	11	Ho Chi Minh City	"Vẽ" by Trúc Nhân	—		—
9	Đào Thái Bình An	12	Đồng Nai	"Biển hát chiều nay " by Trọng Tấn		—	
10	Vũ Linh Đan	12	Hanoi	"Rise Up" by Andra Day			

=== Episode 4 (10 August) ===
Order	Artist	Age	Hometown	Song	Coaches and artists choices		
Order	Artist	Age	Hometown	Song	Dương Cầm & Hương Giang	Ali & Lưu Thiên Hương	Khắc Linh & Quỳnh Anh
1	Bùi Vũ Kim Anh	12	Hai Phong	"Con yêu" by Cẩm Vân			
2	Nguyễn Hồng Ngọc	15	Bình Dương	"Lon ton à, lon ton ơi" by Thùy Chi		—	—
3	Trần Thị Vân Anh	14	Hà Tĩnh	"Xe đạp" by Thùy Chi & M4U	—	—	
4	Nguyễn Thu Minh	9	Bình Dương	"Hương thơm diệu kỳ" by Thu Minh	—	—	—
5	Châu Sở Hân	6	Ho Chi Minh City	"Mình cùng nhau đóng băng" by Thùy Chi	—	—	
6	Trịnh Ngọc Thúy Nga	12	Ho Chi Minh City	"Ru con Nam Bộ" (Traditional)			
7	Nguyễn Ngọc Bảo Hân	12	Lâm Đồng	"Stone Cold" by Demi Lovato			
8	Trần Thị Gia Hân	14	Ho Chi Minh City	"Thương ca Tiếng Việt" by Mỹ Tâm		—	
9	Nguyễn Đỗ Thành Nhân	9	Ho Chi Minh City	"Em bé quê" by Quế Chi	Team full		
10	Nguyễn Trần Nguyên Xuân	13	Ho Chi Minh City	"Beauty and the Beast" by Celine Dion	Team full		
11	Kiều Minh Tâm	11	Hanoi	"Bác Hồ một tình yêu bao la" by Thu Hiền			

== The Battles ==
The Battle Round was taped on July 19, 2019, following the same matching rules as applied in previous seasons. Season seven's advisors include: musician Bảo Lan for team Dương Cầm & Hương Giang, former coach of the adult version Tóc Tiên for team Ali Hoàng Dương & Lưu Thiên Hương, and last season's coach Soobin Hoàng Sơn for team Dương Khắc Linh & Phạm Quỳnh Anh. This season, the coaches can "steal" two losing artists from another team as well as save one losing artist from their own team. Contestants who won their battles or were saved by the coaches would advance to the Knockouts.

Color key:

Artist won the Battle and advanced to the Knockouts
Artist lost the Battle but was stolen by another coach and advanced to the Knockouts
Artist lost the Battle but was saved by their coach and advanced to the Knockouts
Artist lost the Battle and was eliminated

Episode	Coach	Order	Winner	Song	Loser	"Steal"/"Save" result		
Episode	Coach	Order	Winner	Song	Loser	Dương Cầm & Hương Giang	Ali & Lưu Thiên Hương	Khắc Linh & Quỳnh Anh
Episode 5 (17 August)	Ali Hoàng Dương & Lưu Thiên Hương	1	Nguyễn Đỗ Thành Nhân	"Chú ếch con" by Xuân Mai	Kim Jae Bin	✔	—	—
Episode 5 (17 August)	Ali Hoàng Dương & Lưu Thiên Hương	1	Nguyễn Đỗ Thành Nhân	"Chú ếch con" by Xuân Mai	Võ Nguyên Ngọc Nhi	✔	—	—
Episode 5 (17 August)	Dương Cầm & Hương Giang	2	Phạm Thị Trâm Anh	"Tôi là một ngôi sao" by Noo Phước Thịnh/ "ABC" by The Jackson 5	Huỳnh Thị Tố Uyên	—	—	—
Episode 5 (17 August)	Dương Cầm & Hương Giang	2	Phạm Thị Trâm Anh	"Tôi là một ngôi sao" by Noo Phước Thịnh/ "ABC" by The Jackson 5	Trần Thị Gia Hân	—	—	—
Episode 5 (17 August)	Dương Khắc Linh & Phạm Quỳnh Anh	3	Nguyễn Đức Khôi	"Where Is the Love?" by The Black Eyed Peas	Trần Nguyễn Quang Vũ	Steal used	—	—
Episode 5 (17 August)	Dương Khắc Linh & Phạm Quỳnh Anh	3	Nguyễn Đức Khôi	"Where Is the Love?" by The Black Eyed Peas	Nguyễn Trần Nguyên Xuân	Steal used	—	—
Episode 5 (17 August)	Dương Cầm & Hương Giang	4	Nguyễn Đoàn Chấn Quốc	"Cánh hoa tàn" by Hương Tràm/ "Chị tôi" by Mỹ Linh	Bùi Ngọc Ánh	—	—	—
Episode 5 (17 August)	Dương Cầm & Hương Giang	4	Nguyễn Đoàn Chấn Quốc	"Cánh hoa tàn" by Hương Tràm/ "Chị tôi" by Mỹ Linh	Nguyễn Thị Ngọc Ánh	✔	—	—
Episode 6 (24 August)	Ali Hoàng Dương & Lưu Thiên Hương	1	Trần Hiểu Minh	"Cò lả" (Traditional)/ "Quê em mùa nước lũ" by Phương Mỹ Chi/ "Hồ trên núi" by Anh Thơ	Lê Minh Ngọc	Team full	—	—
Episode 6 (24 August)	Ali Hoàng Dương & Lưu Thiên Hương	1	Trần Hiểu Minh	"Cò lả" (Traditional)/ "Quê em mùa nước lũ" by Phương Mỹ Chi/ "Hồ trên núi" by Anh Thơ	Trịnh Ngọc Thúy Nga	Team full	—	—
Episode 6 (24 August)	Dương Khắc Linh & Phạm Quỳnh Anh	2	Vương Hồng Thúy	"Việt Nam những chuyến đi" by Vicky Nhung	Nguyễn Thị Yến Nhi	Team full	—	—
Episode 6 (24 August)	Dương Khắc Linh & Phạm Quỳnh Anh	2	Vương Hồng Thúy	"Việt Nam những chuyến đi" by Vicky Nhung	Võ Khánh Ngọc	Team full	—	—
Episode 6 (24 August)	Dương Cầm & Hương Giang	3	Nguyễn Ngọc Bảo Hân	"Speechless" by Naomi Scott	Vũ Linh Đan	Team full	—	✔
Episode 6 (24 August)	Dương Cầm & Hương Giang	3	Nguyễn Ngọc Bảo Hân	"Speechless" by Naomi Scott	Huỳnh Phạm Thanh Tâm	Team full	—	✔
Episode 6 (24 August)	Dương Khắc Linh & Phạm Quỳnh Anh	4	Ngô Minh Hằng	"Con cò" by Tùng Dương	Trần Thị Vân Anh	Team full	—	—
Episode 6 (24 August)	Dương Khắc Linh & Phạm Quỳnh Anh	4	Ngô Minh Hằng	"Con cò" by Tùng Dương	Trần Thị Diệp Nhi	Team full	—	✔
Episode 7 (31 August)	Dương Cầm & Hương Giang	1	Nguyễn Khánh Vy	"Quê tôi" by Thùy Chi/ "Mẹ yêu con" by Anh Thơ	Nguyễn Hồng Ngọc	Team full	✔	Team full
Episode 7 (31 August)	Dương Cầm & Hương Giang	1	Nguyễn Khánh Vy	"Quê tôi" by Thùy Chi/ "Mẹ yêu con" by Anh Thơ	Hoàng Tấn Lộc	Team full	✔	Team full
Episode 7 (31 August)	Ali Hoàng Dương & Lưu Thiên Hương	2	Nguyễn Đỗ Khánh An	"Cún yêu" by Lương Bích Hữu	Lê Ngọc Thảo Lam	Team full	—	Team full
Episode 7 (31 August)	Ali Hoàng Dương & Lưu Thiên Hương	2	Nguyễn Đỗ Khánh An	"Cún yêu" by Lương Bích Hữu	Bùi Vũ Kim Anh	Team full	—	Team full
Episode 7 (31 August)	Dương Khắc Linh & Phạm Quỳnh Anh	3	Lương Trương Quỳnh Anh	"Nỗi buồn mẹ tôi" by Cẩm Ly/ "Mẹ ơi, đừng bỏ con" by Bùi Hà My	Đào Thái Bình An	Team full	Steal used	Team full
Episode 7 (31 August)	Dương Khắc Linh & Phạm Quỳnh Anh	3	Lương Trương Quỳnh Anh	"Nỗi buồn mẹ tôi" by Cẩm Ly/ "Mẹ ơi, đừng bỏ con" by Bùi Hà My	Châu Sở Hân	Team full	Steal used	Team full
Episode 7 (31 August)	Ali Hoàng Dương & Lưu Thiên Hương	4	Kiều Minh Tâm	"Quê nhà" by Tùng Dương/ "Dệt tầm gai" by Trần Thu Hà	Nguyễn Hoàng Nhã Thy	Team full	—	Team full
Episode 7 (31 August)	Ali Hoàng Dương & Lưu Thiên Hương	4	Kiều Minh Tâm	"Quê nhà" by Tùng Dương/ "Dệt tầm gai" by Trần Thu Hà	Đào Huỳnh Minh Châu	Team full	✔	Team full

== The Knockouts/the Cross Battles ==
The new Knockout round took place on 7 September and lasted until the following week. For the first time in the history of The Voice Kids, the cross-battle was applied which featured battles between contestants from different teams. This round's rules was adopted from the fifth season of the adult version. Each turn, three duo coaches would send one of their team member to a cross battle, and only one contestant with the highest point accumulated from the audience's vote as well as vote from a ten-person professional jury would advance to the next round. Each member of the panel can only vote for one contestant from the trio.

At the end of the round, each coaches could save one of their losing artists, whereas one eliminated artist who had the highest points would also receive the jury's vote and advance to the next round. This new rule resulted in an uneven number of contestants between teams going into the Playoffs.

Color key:

Artist won the Cross Battle and advanced to the Playoffs
Artist lost the Cross Battle but was saved by his/her coach and advanced to the Playoffs
Artist lost the Cross Battle received the jury's vote advanced to the Playoffs
Artist lost the Cross Battle and was eliminated

Episode	Coach	Order	Artist	Song	Jury's point (%)	Public's point (%)	Total point	Result
Episodes 8 (September 7)	Dương Cầm & Hương Giang	1.1	Phạm Thị Trâm Anh	"Giấc mơ của tôi" by Phương Anh	10%	39.20%	49.20%	Eliminated
Episodes 8 (September 7)	Ali Hoàng Dương & Lưu Thiên Hương	1.2	Nguyễn Hồng Ngọc	"Tôi thấy hoa vàng trên cỏ xanh" by Ái Phương	20%	21.08%	41.08%	Eliminated
Episodes 8 (September 7)	Dương Khắc Linh & Phạm Quỳnh Anh	1.3	Huỳnh Phạm Thanh Tâm	"Và Thế Giới Đã Mất Đi Mộṭ Người Cô Đơn" by Marzuz, Gill, Onionn	70%	39.72%	109.72%	Advanced
Episodes 8 (September 7)	Ali Hoàng Dương & Lưu Thiên Hương	2.1	Đào Huỳnh Minh Châu	"Thiên thần từ thiên đường" by PP Nguyễn	20%	69.68%	89.68%	Advanced
Episodes 8 (September 7)	Dương Khắc Linh & Phạm Quỳnh Anh	2.2	Trần Thị Diệp Nhi	"Son" by Đức Nghĩa	80%	4.06%	84.06%	Eliminated
Episodes 8 (September 7)	Dương Cầm & Hương Giang	2.3	Kim Jae Bin	"Thủy thần" by Bùi Hoàng Nam Đức Anh	0%	26.26%	26.26%	Eliminated
Episodes 8 (September 7)	Dương Khắc Linh & Phạm Quỳnh Anh	3.1	Ngô Minh Hằng	"Người đàn bà hóa đá" by Trần Lập	20%	54.66%	74.66%	Advanced
Episodes 8 (September 7)	Dương Cầm & Hương Giang	3.2	Võ Nguyên Ngọc Nhi	"Tôi thích" by Phương Uyên	60%	14.58%	74.58%	Jury's vote
Episodes 8 (September 7)	Ali Hoàng Dương & Lưu Thiên Hương	3.3	Hoàng Tấn Lộc	"Việt Nam trong tôi là" by Yến Lê	20%	30.76%	50.76%	Eliminated
Episodes 8 (September 7)	Dương Cầm & Hương Giang	4.1	Nguyễn Thị Ngọc Ánh	"Ai cũng có ngày xưa" by Phan Mạnh Quỳnh	20%	23.82%	43.82%	Eliminated
Episodes 8 (September 7)	Dương Khắc Linh & Phạm Quỳnh Anh	4.2	Vũ Linh Đan	"This Is Me" by Keala Settle	50%	39.27%	89.27%	Advanced
Episodes 8 (September 7)	Ali Hoàng Dương & Lưu Thiên Hương	4.3	Nguyễn Đỗ Thành Nhân	"Bống Bống Bang Bang" by 365daBand	30%	36.91%	66.91%	Eliminated
Episodes 9 (September 14)	Ali Hoàng Dương & Lưu Thiên Hương	5.1	Nguyễn Đỗ Khánh An	"Duyên phận" by Như Quỳnh	30%	26.25%	56.25%	Jury's vote
Episodes 9 (September 14)	Dương Cầm & Hương Giang	5.2	Nguyễn Đoàn Chấn Quốc	"Papa" by Hồng Nhung	30%	45.33%	75.33%	Advanced
Episodes 9 (September 14)	Dương Khắc Linh & Phạm Quỳnh Anh	5.3	Lương Trương Quỳnh Anh	"Còn duyên" (Traditional)/ "Kiều" by Cao Bá Hưng	40%	28.42%	68.42%	Jury's vote
Episodes 9 (September 14)	Dương Khắc Linh & Phạm Quỳnh Anh	6.1	Nguyễn Đức Khôi	"Jealous" by Labrinth	40%	3.21%	43.21%	Saved by coach
Episodes 9 (September 14)	Dương Cầm & Hương Giang	6.2	Nguyễn Ngọc Bảo Hân	"Bão" by Đinh Tuấn Anh	30%	26.23%	56.23%	Saved by coach
Episodes 9 (September 14)	Ali Hoàng Dương & Lưu Thiên Hương	6.3	Kiều Minh Tâm	"Quê hương tuổi thơ tôi" by Từ Huy	30%	70.56%	100.56%	Advanced
Episodes 9 (September 14)	Ali Hoàng Dương & Lưu Thiên Hương	7.1	Trần Hiểu Minh	"Người ở đừng về"/ "Hoa thơm bướm lượn" (Traditional)	60%	20.65%	80.65%	Saved by coach
Episodes 9 (September 14)	Dương Khắc Linh & Phạm Quỳnh Anh	7.2	Vương Hồng Thúy	"Scarborough Fair" by Simon & Garfunkel	20%	16.69%	36.69%	Eliminated
Episodes 9 (September 14)	Dương Cầm & Hương Giang	7.3	Nguyễn Khánh Vy	"Nhà em ở lưng đồi" by Thùy Chi	20%	62.66%	82.66%	Advanced

== The Playoffs ==
Color key:

Artist was saved by the Public's votes
Artist was saved by his/her coach or placed in the bottom two/three
Artist was originally eliminated but was brought back by the Wildcard
Artist was eliminated by coach
Artist was eliminated after having the lowest vote (Minishow)

=== Round 1: Minishow (21 September, 28 September and 5 October) ===
This year, after the conclusion of a team, each coach had to eliminate one contestant from their teams. At the end of the round, a contestant who receive the lowest vote from the audience would also be eliminated, leaving nine artists advancing to the next round.

Episode	Theme	Coach	Order	Artist	Song	Result
Episodes 10 (September 21)	Childhood	Ali Hoàng Dương & Lưu Thiên Hương	1	Trần Hiểu Minh	"Đồ chơi đất" by Quang Anh/ "Vè con cá" (Traditional)	Eliminated
Episodes 10 (September 21)	Childhood	Ali Hoàng Dương & Lưu Thiên Hương	2	Nguyễn Đỗ Khánh An	"Quạt giấy" by Đoan Trang/ "An" by Lưu Thiên Hương	Saved by public
Episodes 10 (September 21)	Childhood	Ali Hoàng Dương & Lưu Thiên Hương	3	Đào Huỳnh Minh Châu	"Con quay" by Hà Anh Tuấn	Saved by public
Episodes 10 (September 21)	Childhood	Ali Hoàng Dương & Lưu Thiên Hương	4	Kiều Minh Tâm	"Cánh chim lạc"/ "Chín mươi triệu trái tim" by Lưu Thiên Hương	Saved by public
Episodes 10 (September 21)	Childhood	Ali Hoàng Dương & Lưu Thiên Hương	5	Team Ali Hoàng Dương & Lưu Thiên Hương: "Ngày mai" by Tóc Tiên		
Episodes 11 (September 28)	The Little Mermaid	Dương Khắc Linh & Phạm Quỳnh Anh	1	Vũ Linh Đan	"A Million Dreams" from The Greatest Showman	Saved by public
Episodes 11 (September 28)	The Little Mermaid	Dương Khắc Linh & Phạm Quỳnh Anh	2	Lương Trương Quỳnh Anh	"Họ không là duy nhất" from Thủy Tinh - đứa con thứ 101	Saved by public
Episodes 11 (September 28)	The Little Mermaid	Dương Khắc Linh & Phạm Quỳnh Anh	3	Ngô Minh Hằng	"Ngôi sao Bạch tuộc" ("Prince Ali" reworked Vietnamese version)	Saved by public
Episodes 11 (September 28)	The Little Mermaid	Dương Khắc Linh & Phạm Quỳnh Anh	4	Nguyễn Đức Khôi	"Earth Song" by Michael Jackson	Eliminated
Episodes 11 (September 28)	The Little Mermaid	Dương Khắc Linh & Phạm Quỳnh Anh	5	Huỳnh Phạm Thanh Tâm	"You Are Not Alone" by Michael Jackson	Eliminated
Episodes 11 (September 28)	The Little Mermaid	Dương Khắc Linh & Phạm Quỳnh Anh	6	Team Dương Khắc Linh & Phạm Quỳnh Anh: "My Favorite Things" from The Sound of Music/ "We Are the Future" by Dương Khắc Linh		
Episodes 12 (October 5)	Humanity classes	Dương Cầm & Hương Giang	1	Nguyễn Khánh Vy	"Để Mị nói cho mà nghe" by Hoàng Thùy Linh	Eliminated
Episodes 12 (October 5)	Humanity classes	Dương Cầm & Hương Giang	2	Võ Nguyên Ngọc Nhi	"Chí Phèo" by Bùi Công Nam	Saved by public
Episodes 12 (October 5)	Humanity classes	Dương Cầm & Hương Giang	3	Nguyễn Đoàn Chấn Quốc	"The Music of the Night" from The Phantom of the Opera	Saved by public
Episodes 12 (October 5)	Humanity classes	Dương Cầm & Hương Giang	4	Nguyễn Ngọc Bảo Hân	"Tell Me Why" by Declan Galbraith	Saved by public
Episodes 12 (October 5)	Humanity classes	Dương Cầm & Hương Giang	5	Team Dương Cầm & Hương Giang: "Thật bất ngờ" by Trúc Nhân/ "Bước đi không dừng lại" by Dương Hoàng Yến		

=== Round 2: Quarterfinal (Top 9) ===
The remaining nine artists each performed a solo performance for a spot in the Semi-final. At the end of the night, each team had to eliminate one contestant, leaving six artists advanced to next week's Semi-final. A Wildcard vote was conducted to save two contestants who was eliminated from this stage of the competition to the Live Finale.

Episode	Coach	Order	Artist	Song	Result
Episode 13 (October 12)	Dương Khắc Linh & Phạm Quỳnh Anh	1	Ngô Minh Hằng	"Giọt sương trên mí mắt" by Hồng Nhung	Saved by coach
Episode 13 (October 12)	Ali Hoàng Dương & Lưu Thiên Hương	2	Đào Huỳnh Minh Châu	"Huyền thoại mẹ" by Thu Hiền	Eliminated
Episode 13 (October 12)	Dương Khắc Linh & Phạm Quỳnh Anh	3	Lương Trương Quỳnh Anh	"Đêm mưa nhớ mẹ" by Võ Hoàng Lâm	Eliminated
Episode 13 (October 12)	Dương Cầm & Hương Giang	4	Nguyễn Đoàn Chấn Quốc	"Có chàng trai viết lên cây" by Phan Mạnh Quỳnh	Saved by coach
Episode 13 (October 12)	Ali Hoàng Dương & Lưu Thiên Hương	5	Kiều Minh Tâm	"Mẹ tôi" by Trần Thu Hà	Saved by coach
Episode 13 (October 12)	Dương Cầm & Hương Giang	6	Võ Nguyên Ngọc Nhi	"Chuồn chuồn ớt" by Ngọc Khuê	Eliminated
Episode 13 (October 12)	Dương Cầm & Hương Giang	7	Nguyễn Ngọc Bảo Hân	"Adagio" by Lara Fabian	Saved by coach
Episode 13 (October 12)	Ali Hoàng Dương & Lưu Thiên Hương	8	Nguyễn Đỗ Khánh An	"Mừng tuổi mẹ" by Phi Nhung	Saved by coach
Episode 13 (October 12)	Dương Khắc Linh & Phạm Quỳnh Anh	9	Vũ Linh Đan	"Sweet but Psycho" by Ava Max	Saved by coach

=== Round 3: Semifinal (Top 6) ===
The remaining six artists performed a solo performance for a spot in the Grand Final. At the end of the night, one contestant from each team would advance to the finals based on coaches' choices. The result of the Wildcard was announced on 21 October, revealing the last two finalists. The recipients of the Wildcards were Nguyễn Đỗ Khánh An and Nguyễn Ngọc Bảo Hân.

Episode	Coach	Order	Artist	Song	Result
Episode 14 (October 19)	Dương Cầm & Hương Giang	1	Nguyễn Đoàn Chấn Quốc	"Bão đêm" by Microwave Band	Saved by coach
Episode 14 (October 19)	Ali Hoàng Dương & Lưu Thiên Hương	2	Nguyễn Đỗ Khánh An	"Nhiều người ôm giấc mơ" by Lê Cát Trọng Lý	Finals Wildcard
Episode 14 (October 19)	Ali Hoàng Dương & Lưu Thiên Hương	3	Kiều Minh Tâm	"Ngọn lửa cao nguyên" by Siu Black	Saved by coach
Episode 14 (October 19)	Dương Khắc Linh & Phạm Quỳnh Anh	4	Vũ Linh Đan	"Về với đông" by Hồng Nhung	Saved by coach
Episode 14 (October 19)	Dương Cầm & Hương Giang	5	Nguyễn Ngọc Bảo Hân	"Anh đang ở đâu đấy anh" by Hương Giang	Finals Wildcard
Episode 14 (October 19)	Dương Khắc Linh & Phạm Quỳnh Anh	6	Ngô Minh Hằng	"DIVA" by Thu Minh	Eliminated

Non-competition performances
Order	Performers	Song
14.1	Trúc Nhân ft. Team Ali Hoàng Dương & Lưu Thiên Hương	"Sáng mắt chưa" by Trúc Nhân
14.2	Bảo Hân ft. Phạm Quỳnh Anh and her team	"Cảm ơn con nhé" from Về Nhà Đi Con
14.3	Nguyễn Ngọc Bảo Hân & Chromatic	"Bohemian Rhapsody" by Queen
14.4	Nguyễn Đoàn Chấn Quốc with Jack & K-ICM	"Sóng Gió" by Jack & K-ICM

== Elimination chart ==
Artist's info

- Artist from Team Dương Cầm & Hương Giang
- Artist from Team Ali Hoàng Dương & Lưu Thiên Hương
- Artist from Team Dương Khắc Linh & Phạm Quỳnh Anh

Result details

- Winner
- Runner-up
- Third place
- Fourth Place
- Artist was saved by Wildcard
- Artist was saved by the public
- Artist was saved by his/her coach
- Artist was eliminated

Artist	Week 1-3	Week 4	Semi-Final	Finals
Kiều Minh Tâm	Safe	Safe	Safe	Winner
Nguyễn Đoàn Chấn Quốc	Safe	Safe	Safe	Runner-up
Vũ Linh Đan	Safe	Safe	Safe	3rd Place
Nguyễn Ngọc Bảo Hân	Safe	Safe	Wildcard	4th Place
Nguyễn Đỗ Khánh An	Safe	Safe	Wildcard	5th Place
Ngô Minh Hằng	Safe	Safe	Eliminated	Eliminated (Week 5)
Võ Nguyên Ngọc Nhi	Safe	Eliminated	Eliminated (Week 4)	
Đào Huỳnh Minh Châu	Safe	Eliminated	Eliminated (Week 4)	
Lương Trương Quỳnh Anh	Safe	Eliminated	Eliminated (Week 4)	
Nguyễn Khánh Vy	Eliminated	Eliminated (Minishow)		
Trần Hiểu Minh	Eliminated	Eliminated (Minishow)		
Nguyễn Đức Khôi	Eliminated	Eliminated (Minishow)		
Huỳnh Phạm Thanh Tâm	Eliminated	Eliminated (Minishow)		

== Controversies ==
Throughout the airing time of the season, there were many accusations that the show's result was fixed in favor of one team over the other two. During the Cross Battles, controversy arose when a contestant received the highest vote count from the professional jury, creating a big difference with the other two contestants but was then eliminated because of the audience's vote. After the show aired, many viewers expressed their frustration, saying that the producers deliberately arranged the results in order to send through a contestant from Lưu Thiên Hương's team because she has a close relationship with the producers and the music director. The public also criticised the justice of the "audience vote", questioning whether audiences in the studio actually voted. However, producers of The Voice Kids did not give a response.

During the Live Finale which aired on 26 October 2019, upon announcing the final results, host Nguyên Khang mistakenly named the first runner-up, Nguyễn Đoàn Chấn Quốc (team Dương Cầm & Hương Giang) as the winner. A few moments later, Nguyên Khang announced that he had read the results incorrectly and that Kiều Minh Tâm (team Ali Hoàng Dương & Lưu Thiên Hương) was the actual winner. Accusations once again arose that the final result was fixed in favor of Lưu Thiên Hương's contestant, whereas the majority of viewers criticised the show for making a joke of children's feelings. Nguyên Khang however did publicly apologize to Chấn Quốc and his family about his mistake.

On 27 October, a day after the finale, when asked about the incident during the crown moment, Lưu Thiên Hương commented that she thought it was a "small accident" and considered it "memorable" for helping build up bravery for contestants. Her comment immediately received mixed reactions from artists alike as well as the public, with singer Dương Triệu Vũ, supermodel Xuân Lan and Lê Thúy all expressing their frustrations via social media.

== Contestants who appeared on previous shows or seasons ==
- Lương Trương Quỳnh Anh appeared on the show's last season but did not turn a chair.
- Trần Thị Vân Anh auditioned for the show's fifth season but failed to make a team.
- Nguyễn Đỗ Khánh An was the winner of Bolero Idol Kids in 2018.
