= Phan Gia Nhật Linh =

Vietnamese film director and critic

Phan Gia Nhat Linh
- Born: 1979 (age 46–47); Ho Chi Minh City, Vietnam
- Other name: Phanxine
- Education: University of Southern California
- Occupations: Film director; Film critic
- Years active: 1997–present
- Notable work: Em là bà nội của anh, The Sympathizer

Phan Gia Nhật Linh (born 1979) is a Vietnamese film director and screenwriter.

He is best known for directing Sweet 20 (2015), The Girl from Yesterday (2017), and Em và Trịnh (2022).

His works are recognized for adapting popular literary and cinematic stories into contemporary Vietnamese contexts.

== Biography and career ==
Phan Gia Nhật Linh was born in Ho Chi Minh City, Vietnam. After graduating from high school, he attended Ho Chi Minh City University of Architecture before pursuing film studies. After graduating from high school, he enrolled in the Ho Chi Minh City University of Architecture, inspired by directors James Cameron and Luc Besson, both of whom studied architecture.

In 2006, he received a film scholarship from the Ford Foundation to study at the University of Southern California.

He later collaborated with Vietnamese-American directors Charlie Nguyễn and Nguyễn Quang Dũng before releasing his debut feature film, Sweet 20 (2015).

His second film, Cô Gái Đến Từ Hôm Qua (The Girl from Yesterday), a romantic production, was released in 2017.

Both films performed well commercially, grossing over VNĐ 20 billion (US$850,000) in their first week of release.

In 2020, he worked on the $1 million comedy entitled Trạng Tí (Child Master) featuring Vietnamese folk stories.

His 2022 biographical film Em và Trịnh, about musician Trịnh Công Sơn, grossed approximately VNĐ100 billion (US$4.1 million) after five weeks in theaters.

Phan began his filmmaking career after working as a film critic. In 2008, he decided to develop films centered on Vietnamese culture and identity.

It was in 2008 but it could have been a satirical scene out of the Vietnam Era-novel “The Sympathizer.” Someone from a movie studio visiting his University of Southern California film class told him his story pitch about a Vietnamese American woman traveling the U.S. would only work if the heroine was white.

Having a white star would give the film “a broader audience,” Phanxinê recounts being told.

In a 2008 interview, Phan recalled being advised during his studies at the University of Southern California to make his story more appealing to Western audiences by changing the lead character to a white woman. He later stated that this experience influenced his decision to focus on Vietnamese stories and culture in his filmmaking career.

Phan Gia Nhat Linh is set to write and direct Vu Trong Phung’s Dumb Luck.

Dumb Luck is based on Vũ Trọng Phụng’s 1936 novel of the same name, which many have regarded as one of the most popular Vietnamese novels of the 20th century.

Starring Vietnamese singer MONO, the adaptation will be directed and written by Phan Gia Nhat Linh (The Girl From Yesterday, Em Va Trinh).

== Filmography ==
=== Films ===
Year	Title	Genre	Format
2010	Thằng chó chết	Drama	Short film
2014	Bếp hát (with Danny Đỗ)	Drama, Musical	Television
2015	Sweet 20	Comedy, Drama	Feature film
2017	The Girl From Yesterday	Romantic comedy	Feature film
2021	Trạng Tí phiêu lưu ký	Comedy	Feature film
2022	Em và Trịnh	Drama, Romance	Feature film
2022	Trịnh Công Sơn	Drama, Romance	Feature film
2024	Trước giờ "yêu"	Romantic comedy	Feature film
2025	Leaving Mom	Drama	Feature film

=== Acting ===
Year	Title	Genre	Format	Role
2024	The Sympathizer	Black comedy, Drama, Historical	Television	Major Oanh

== Awards ==
Year	Award	Category	Work	Result
2015	Vietnam Film Festival	Best Film as voted by the audience (Panorama section)	Sweet 20	Won
