= Dumb Luck =

Dumb Luck may refer to:

- Luck
- Dumb Luck (novel), a 1936 novel by Vũ Trọng Phụng
- Dumb Luck, a compilation of art by Gary Baseman
- Dumb Luck (album), a 2007 album by Dntel
- "Dumb Luck", an episode of The Grim Adventures of Billy and Mandy
