= The Voice Kids of Vietnam season 6 =

Seventh season of The Voice Kids Vietnam

The Voice Kids of Vietnam
- Season 6
- Hosted by: Phí Linh; Ali Hoàng Dương; Vannie
- Judges: Hồ Hoài Anh; Lưu Hương Giang; Soobin Hoàng Sơn; Vũ Cát Tường; Khắc Hưng; Bảo Anh
- Winner: Hà Quỳnh Như
- Winning coach: Hồ Hoài Anh & Lưu Hương Giang
- Runner-up: Đào Đình Anh Tuấn

Release
- Original network: VTV3
- Original release: September 8 – December 29, 2018

Season chronology
- ← Previous; Season 5 Next → Season 7

The sixth season of The Voice Kids of Vietnam- Giọng hát Việt nhí began on 8 September 2018 on VTV3. The coaching panel this season consists of six coaches divided into three duo coaches. Veteran coaches Hồ Hoài Anh & Lưu Hương Giang returned to the show after a two-season hiatus, as well as Vũ Cát Tường and Soobin Hoàng Sơn who both returned from the last season. Singer Bảo Anh and music producer Khắc Hưng joined as new coaches. This season marked the first time in any version of The Voice worldwide to have three different duo coaches, and the second time in the whole franchise that the judging panel consists of six coaches, following the Belgian-Flemish Kids version.

14-year-old Hà Quỳnh Như was announced the winner of the season. It was Hồ Hoài Anh & Lưu Hương Giang's third victory as coaches throughout the series.

== Coaches and hosts ==
The coaching panel was entirely modified in comparison to the last season. On June 12, 2018, it was revealed that all coaches this season would be duos and the husband-and-wife duo Hồ Hoài Anh and Lưu Hương Giang, who served as a duo coach for the first three seasons, would return for the sixth season. A week later, Vũ Cát Tường confirmed that she is returning to the show for her third year. The following day, Soobin Hoàng Sơn also confirmed joining the coaching panel for his second year, while former The Voice season 1 contestant Bảo Anh was announced as a new coach. On July 31, music producer Khắc Hưng was announced as the new sixth coach for the sixth season. On the taping day at August 2, 2018, it was revealed that the two new coaches would form a new duo coach, whereas Soobin and Vũ Cát Tường would combine as a duo coach. Meanwhile, The Voice season 4 winner Ali Hoàng Dương was appointed as the new host for season 6, replacing former host Thành Trung.

== Teams ==
Color key

- Winner
- Runner-up
- Third place
- Fourth place
- Eliminated in the Playoffs
- Eliminated in the Battle rounds

Coaches	Top 45 Artists				
Soobin Hoàng Sơn & Vũ Cát Tường					
Soobin Hoàng Sơn & Vũ Cát Tường	Đào Đình Anh Tuấn	Nguyễn Trần Xuân Phương	Nguyễn Minh Nhật	Trần Ngọc Gia Hân	Nguyễn Thị Hải Yến
Soobin Hoàng Sơn & Vũ Cát Tường	Nguyễn Hoàng Thiên Nga	Nguyễn Khánh Hà	Nguyễn Bích Hà My	Nguyễn Thái Gia Bảo	Huỳnh Tấn Đạt
Soobin Hoàng Sơn & Vũ Cát Tường	Vũ Phương Linh	Nguyễn Phan Quỳnh Anh	Phạm Anh Thư	Phan Bảo Long	Trần Vũ Bảo Ngọc
Hồ Hoài Anh & Lưu Hương Giang					
Hồ Hoài Anh & Lưu Hương Giang	Hà Quỳnh Như	Nguyễn Trần Phương Trúc	Nguyễn Thị Thanh Hằng	Lý Nguyễn Gia Hân	Hà Trọng Vũ & Hà Trọng Sáng
Hồ Hoài Anh & Lưu Hương Giang	Trần Phi Hùng	Chu Thị Ngọc Ánh	Giang Gia Nhi	Trần Viết Học	Lưu Khánh Ngọc
Hồ Hoài Anh & Lưu Hương Giang	Phạm Lê Quốc Hưng	Võ Phan Mai Khôi	Lê Nhật Linh	Đoàn Ngọc Linh	Phạm Ngọc Thiên Thanh
Khắc Hưng & Bảo Anh					
Khắc Hưng & Bảo Anh	Nguyễn Minh Chiến	Nguyễn Văn Minh	Phạm Anh Khôi	Phạm Minh Ngọc	Trần Đặng Phương Vy
Khắc Hưng & Bảo Anh	Nguyễn Thị Bảo Anh	Vũ Hà Trang	Nguyễn Lê Minh Nguyên	Nguyễn Vũ Thanh Ngọc	Lê Uyên Nhi
Khắc Hưng & Bảo Anh	Tăng Ngọc Thanh Vân	Trần Châu Kim Anh	Nguyễn Ngọc Trường Phước	Bùi Yến Nhi	Nguyễn Thành An
Note: Italicized names are saved by their coach in the battles. Bold names are Wildcard contestant who was previously eliminated but was brought back to the Semifinals or Finals.

== Blind auditions ==
Filming for the blind auditions began on August 2, 2018. The blind auditions consists of five episodes, airing from September 8 to October 20, because two episodes were delayed to the following week due to two state funerals. Each coach has the length of the contestant's performance to choose them for their team. If more than two coaches want the same contestant, the contestant will choose which team they want to join. The blind auditions end when all teams are full. However, in this season two new rules were introduced:

- The Block button, which was adopted from the fourteenth season of the U.S version, would prevent a coach from getting an artist if they turn their chairs. Each coach only had one Block per audition.
- The Mute button, which prevents a coach from talking with an artist in order to convince them to join their team, but instead could still do any kind of body language to interact with the contestant. However, the Mute only adds excitement to the program, as contestant can still pick the muted team. Each coach had only one Mute per audition. The Mute can only be used when the chairs are turned, as the Block button will turn into the Mute.

Color key

	Coach hit his or her "TÔI CHỌN BẠN" (I WANT YOU) button
	Artist defaulted to a coach's team
	Artist elected a coach's team
	Artist was eliminated with no coach pressing their button
	Coach pressed the "I WANT YOU" button, but was blocked by Soobin & Vũ Cát Tường from getting the artist
	Coach pressed the "I WANT YOU" button, but was blocked by Hoài Anh & Hương Giang from getting the artist
	Coach pressed the "I WANT YOU" button, but was blocked by Khắc Hưng & Bảo Anh from getting the artist
✔	Coach was "muted" by Soobin & Vũ Cát Tường
✔	Coach was "muted" by Hoài Anh & Hương Giang
✔	Coach was "muted" by Khắc Hưng & Bảo Anh
	Coach pressing their "TÔI CHỌN BẠN" (I WANT YOU) button, despite the lack of places in their team

=== Episode 1 (8 September) ===
Order	Artist	Age	Hometown	Song	Coaches and artists choices		
Order	Artist	Age	Hometown	Song	Soobin & Vũ Cát Tường	Hoài Anh & Hương Giang	Khắc Hưng & Bảo Anh
1	Phạm Anh Khôi	10	Ho Chi Minh City	"Happy Birthday Xoay Xoay" - Vicky Nhung			
2	Nguyễn Lê Minh Nguyên	12	Bình Thuận	"Góc đa hình" - Vũ Cát Tường			
3	Tăng Ngọc Thanh Vân	13	Ho Chi Minh City	"Giọt sương trên mí mắt" - Hồng Nhung	—	—	
4	Nguyễn Vũ Thanh Ngọc	11	Ho Chi Minh City	"Người mẹ của tôi" - Xuân Hồng	—	—	
5	Lưu Khánh Ngọc	8	—N/a	"Cha và con gái" - Thùy Chi	—		—
6	Nguyễn Thị Hải Yến	7	Hải Dương	"Lòng mẹ" - Y Vân	✔		✔
7	Giang Gia Nhi	11	Ho Chi Minh City	"Gợi nhớ quê hương" - Phi Nhung	—		
8	Hà Trọng Vũ & Hà Trọng Sáng	13	Thanh Hóa	"Making Money" - Trúc Nhân	—		
9	Trần Vũ Bảo Ngọc	12	Ho Chi Minh City	"Về nhà thôi" - Hải Nam			
10	Hà Quỳnh Như	14	Nghệ An	"A Moment Like This" - Kelly Clarkson			

=== Episode 2 (15 September) ===
Order	Artist	Age	Hometown	Song	Coaches and artists choices		
Order	Artist	Age	Hometown	Song	Soobin & Vũ Cát Tường	Hoài Anh & Hương Giang	Khắc Hưng & Bảo Anh
1	Chu Thị Ngọc Ánh	12	Hanoi	"Hà Nội trà đá vỉa hè" - Đinh Mạnh Ninh			—
2	Phạm Minh Ngọc	11	Hanoi	"Ashes" - Celine Dion			
3	Đào Đình Anh Tuấn	12	Thanh Hóa	"Về nghe gió kể" - Đông Hùng			
4	Nguyễn Thành An	12	Hanoi	"Love Yourself" - Justin Bieber			
5	Nguyễn Hoàng Thiên Nga	11	Ho Chi Minh City	"One Night Only" - Jennifer Hudson		—	
6	Nguyễn Trần Xuân Phương	—N/a	—N/a	"Độc huyền cầm" - Bảo Lan		—	—
7	Trần Châu Kim Anh	12	Sóc Trăng	"Hình bóng quê nhà" - Thanh Sơn	—	—	
8	Nguyễn Văn Minh	11	Ho Chi Minh City	"Không tên" - Microwave Band			

=== Episode 3 (29 September) ===
Due to the state funeral of Vietnamese President Trần Đại Quang, the third episode of the Blind Audition was delayed for one week.

Order	Artist	Age	Hometown	Song	Coaches and artists choices		
Order	Artist	Age	Hometown	Song	Soobin & Vũ Cát Tường	Hoài Anh & Hương Giang	Khắc Hưng & Bảo Anh
1	Võ Phan Mai Khôi	11	Ho Chi Minh City	"Giăng tơ" - Tùng Dương			—
2	Phạm Lê Quốc Hưng	12	Gia Lai	"Quê hương tuổi thơ tôi" - Từ Huy			
3	Phạm Anh Thư	11	Hanoi	"Ngủ đi con yêu"- Thùy Chi		—	
4	Lê Nhật Linh	10	Nghệ An	"Con nít" - Lynk Lee	—		—
5	Phan Bảo Long	12	Hanoi	"When We Were Young" - Adele		—	—
6	Vũ Phương Linh	14	Quảng Bình	"Bèo dạt mây trôi" (Traditional)			
7	Đoàn Ngọc Linh	12	Hải Phòng	"Muốn khóc thật to" - Tăng Nhật Tuệ	—		
8	Nguyễn Khánh Hà	9	Hà Tĩnh	"Huế thương"/ "Ai xa xứ Huế" - Quang Lê			
9	Lương Trương Quỳnh Anh	N/A	N/A	"Dạ cổ hoài lang" - Cao Văn Lầu	—	—	—
10	Nguyễn Thái Gia Bảo	11	Hải Phòng	"Tâm hồn của đá" - Trần Lập		—	

=== Episode 4 (13 October) ===
Due to the state funeral of former Vietnamese Party chief Đỗ Mười, the fourth episode of the Blind Audition was delayed for one week.

Order	Artist	Age	Hometown	Song	Coaches and artists choices		
Order	Artist	Age	Hometown	Song	Soobin & Vũ Cát Tường	Hoài Anh & Hương Giang	Khắc Hưng & Bảo Anh
1	Nguyễn Minh Nhật	14	Quy Nhơn	"Đêm mưa nhớ mẹ" - Võ Hoàng Lâm			
2	Trần Đặng Phương Vy	11	Ho Chi Minh City	"Girls Like You" - Maroon 5 ft. Cardi B			
3	Huỳnh Tấn Đạt	12	Đắk Lắk	"Dòng máu Lạc Hồng" - Đan Trường			
4	Lý Nguyễn Gia Hân	12	Đồng Nai	"Mẹ" - Quách Beem, Khởi My			
5	Nguyễn Thị Thanh Hằng	13	Vĩnh Phúc	"Biết ơn chị Võ Thị Sáu" - Thanh Thúy	—		—
6	Trần Ngọc Gia Hân	11	Ho Chi Minh City	"Để gió cuốn đi" - Trịnh Công Sơn		—	—
7	Nguyễn Ngọc Trường Phước	11	Quốc Oai	"Ơn nghĩa sinh thành" - Ngọc Sơn	—	—	
8	Nguyễn Thu Huyền	10	Hòa Bình	"Never Enough" - Loren Allred	—	—	—
9	Nguyễn Hoàng Anh Thư	12	Ho Chi Minh City	"Khoảng trời của bé" - Thùy Chi	—	—	—
10	Trần Phi Hùng	12	Đắk Lắk	"Queen of The Night" - Mozart			

Proper evaluation was not done for this girl Nguyễn Thu Huyền. The song was awarded as one of the TOP 10 | Most Difficult Songs to sing in The Voice Kids. The feedback by the viewer has also criticized the judgement of judges. Check comments section. The song (sung by this girl) is in the link

=== Episode 5 (20 October) ===
Order	Artist	Age	Hometown	Song	Coaches and artists choices		
Order	Artist	Age	Hometown	Song	Soobin & Vũ Cát Tường	Hoài Anh & Hương Giang	Khắc Hưng & Bảo Anh
1	Nguyễn Trần Phương Trúc	12	Ho Chi Minh City	"Mình cùng nhau đóng băng" - Thùy Chi			
2	Vũ Hà Trang	8	Hai Phong	"Đừng để con một mình" - Trang Pháp			
3	Nguyễn Bích Hà My	10	—N/a	"Lá cờ" - Tạ Quang Thắng		—	—
4	Nguyễn Thị Bảo Anh	12	Thanh Hóa	"Câu hò bên bờ Hiền Lương" - Thu Hiền	—	—	
5	Lê Uyên Nhi	12	Hanoi	"Cảm ơn cha"- Hồ Võ Thanh Thảo		—	
6	Nguyễn Phan Quỳnh Anh	10	Vinh	"Lon ton à lon ton ơi" - Thùy Chi		—	—
7	Trần Viết Học	12	Hà Tĩnh	"Hà Nội mười hai mùa hoa" - Thu Phương			✔
8	Phạm Ngọc Thiên Thanh	12	Ho Chi Minh City	"Quê tôi" - Thuỳ Chi			—
9	Lê Nguyễn Yến Nhi	11	Nam Định	"Non nước hữu tình" - Thanh Sơn	Team full	Team full	—
10	Bùi Yến Nhi	14	Hanoi	"One Moment In Time" - Whitney Houston	Team full	Team full	
11	Lê Ngọc Thảo Lam	10	N/A	"Và tôi đi" - Đoàn Thế Lân (Sing My Song)	Team full	Team full	—
12	Dương Việt Cường	N/A	N/A	"Chuông gió" - Thu Minh	Team full	Team full	—
13	Nguyễn Minh Chiến	11	Ho Chi Minh City	"Nơi ấy con tìm về" - Phan Mạnh Quỳnh			

== The Battles ==
The Battle Round was taped on September 18, 2018. The 15 contestants in each team will be divided into five match-ups, each with three contestants. Each group will perform a pre-rehearsed song on the stage. After going on stage to finish the confrontation song with the contestants and coaches, the coaches will name one of the three contestants of each group as the winner. This season, the Battle Round introduced the Save button that allowed a coach to keep a contestant they just eliminated from the competition, which is similar to the Knockout stage of the fourteenth season of the U.S version. Contestants who won their battles or saved by their coaches will advance to the Playoffs.

Due to health problems, coach Khắc Hưng was not able to attend the Battle round, leaving Bảo Anh to make decisions on the result of the Battles of team Khắc Hưng & Bảo Anh alone. The advisors for each team are: singer Hồ Quỳnh Hương for team Soobin & Vũ Cát Tường, former coaches Đông Nhi & Ông Cao Thắng for team Hồ Hoài Anh & Lưu Hương Giang, and Dương Triệu Vũ for team Khắc Hưng & Bảo Anh.

Colour key

Artist won the Battle and advanced to the Playoffs
Artist lost the Battle but was saved by the coach and advanced to the Playoffs
Artist lost the Battle and was eliminated

Episode	Coach	Order	Winner	Song	Losers	
Episode 6 (27 October 2018)	Hồ Hoài Anh & Lưu Hương Giang	1	Lý Nguyễn Gia Hân	"Triệu bông hồng" (Traditional Latvian song) / "Đóa hoa hồng" - Chi Pu	Võ Phan Mai Khôi	Phạm Ngọc Thiên Thanh
Episode 6 (27 October 2018)	Khắc Hưng & Bảo Anh	2	Phạm Minh Ngọc	"Halo" - Beyoncé	Nguyễn Thành An	Bùi Yến Nhi
Episode 6 (27 October 2018)	Hồ Hoài Anh & Lưu Hương Giang	3	Hà Trọng Vũ & Hà Trọng Sáng	"Nước ngoài" - Phan Mạnh Quỳnh	Lê Nhật Linh	Đoàn Ngọc Linh
Episode 6 (27 October 2018)	Soobin Hoàng Sơn & Vũ Cát Tường	4	Nguyễn Hoàng Thiên Nga	"Stone Cold" - Demi Lovato	Trần Vũ Bảo Ngọc	Phan Bảo Long
Episode 6 (27 October 2018)	Soobin Hoàng Sơn & Vũ Cát Tường	5	Nguyễn Trần Xuân Phương	"Áo xanh" - MTV Band	Đào Đình Anh Tuấn	Phạm Anh Thư
Episode 7 (3 November 2018)	Soobin Hoàng Sơn & Vũ Cát Tường	1	Trần Ngọc Gia Hân	"Tìm lại" - Microwave Band	Nguyễn Thái Gia Bảo	Huỳnh Tấn Đạt
Episode 7 (3 November 2018)	Khắc Hưng & Bảo Anh	2	Nguyễn Thị Bảo Anh	"Làng quan họ quê tôi" - Anh Thơ / "Một khúc tâm tình người Hà Tĩnh" - Thu Hiền / "Bài ca đất phương Nam" - Cẩm Ly	Nguyễn Ngọc Trường Phước	Trần Châu Kim Anh
Episode 7 (3 November 2018)	Hồ Hoài Anh & Lưu Hương Giang	3	Trần Phi Hùng	"Somewhere Over The Rainbow" - Judy Garland	Lưu Khánh Ngọc	Phạm Lê Quốc Hưng
Episode 7 (3 November 2018)	Khắc Hưng & Bảo Anh	4	Nguyễn Minh Chiến	"Đứa bé" - Minh Khang	Tăng Ngọc Thanh Vân	Phạm Anh Khôi
Episode 7 (3 November 2018)	Soobin Hoàng Sơn & Vũ Cát Tường	5	Nguyễn Minh Nhật	"Nhớ mẹ lý mồ côi" - Cẩm Ly	Vũ Phương Linh	Nguyễn Phan Quỳnh Anh
Episode 8 (10 November 2018)	Hồ Hoài Anh & Lưu Hương Giang	1	Nguyễn Trần Phương Trúc	"Mặt trời của em" - Phương Vy ft. JustaTee / "Way Back Home" - SHAUN	Giang Gia Nhi	Chu Thị Ngọc Ánh
Episode 8 (10 November 2018)	Khắc Hưng & Bảo Anh	2	Trần Đặng Phương Vy	"Quảng Bình Quê Ta Ơi" - Thu Hiền / "Hát Về Cây Lúa Hôm Nay" - Trọng Tấn	Vũ Hà Trang	Nguyễn Vũ Thanh Ngọc
Episode 8 (10 November 2018)	Soobin Hoàng Sơn & Vũ Cát Tường	3	Nguyễn Thị Hải Yến	"Mẹ yêu con" - Nguyễn Văn Tý	Nguyễn Bích Hà My	Nguyễn Khánh Hà
Episode 8 (10 November 2018)	Khắc Hưng & Bảo Anh	4	Nguyễn Văn Minh	"Ngày của tôi" - Thu Minh	Lê Uyên Nhi	Nguyễn Lê Minh Nguyên
Episode 8 (10 November 2018)	Hồ Hoài Anh & Lưu Hương Giang	5	Hà Quỳnh Như	"Inh Ả ơi" (Traditional) / "Xôn Xang Mênh Mang Cao Nguyên Daklak" - Y Moan	Trần Viết Học	Nguyễn Thị Thanh Hằng

== The Playoffs ==
Similar to the previous season, all the playoffs rounds were pre-recorded until the Playoff, Part 5 (Top 10). Results are voted on in real-time by audience attending the show in the filming location by both tele-voting and mobile app.

This season, two Wildcards are awarded. The first one would bring back a contestant who was eliminated prior to the Semi-finals (including the Battles) straight to the Semi-finals, while the second one would advance an artist eliminated in the Semi-final to the Live Finale. Audience can vote for the Wildcard with the same method for the contestant in Playoff rounds.

Special guest stars performed on the Live Semi-final and the Live Final. Singers Hồng Thắm, Phan Mạnh Quỳnh along with former contestants Erik (season 1 contestant), Phương Mỹ Chi (season 1 runner-up), Đỗ Thị Hoài Ngọc (season 5 runner-up) and Dương Ngọc Ánh (season 5 winner) performed with the semi-finalists on the Semi-final. Trần Minh Như (The X Factor Vietnam season 2 winner) and Trần Ngọc Ánh (The Voice season 5 winner) performed on the Final.

Color key:

Artist was saved by the Public's votes
Artist was saved by his/her coach or placed in the bottom two/three
Artist was originally eliminated but was brought back by the Wildcard
Artist was eliminated

=== Round 1: Minishow (17 November, 24 November and 1 December) ===
As first applied in the previous season, in the first round of the Playoffs, all teams had to set up a minishow which consists of performances from all team members and concludes with a group performance of the coaches and the contestants. Each team performed on one night and nominated two contestants for elimination at the end of the night. The final result was announced after all teams performed at the end of night 3. In a new twist, the team receiving the most public vote would be declared safe and would have all team members advanced to the next round, while the two other coaches would lose the two contestants nominated for elimination earlier.

Episode	Theme	Coach	Order	Artist	Song	Result
Episode 9 (17 November 2018)	Colors of life	Khắc Hưng & Bảo Anh	1	Nguyễn Thị Bảo Anh	"Nhà em ở lưng đồi" - Thùy Chi	Eliminated
Episode 9 (17 November 2018)	Colors of life	Khắc Hưng & Bảo Anh	2	Nguyễn Minh Chiến	"Ngồi hát đỡ buồn" - Trúc Nhân	Safe
Episode 9 (17 November 2018)	Colors of life	Khắc Hưng & Bảo Anh	3	Phạm Minh Ngọc	"Everybody Has a Dream" - Billy Joel	Safe
Episode 9 (17 November 2018)	Colors of life	Khắc Hưng & Bảo Anh	4	Phạm Anh Khôi	"Vì tôi còn sống" - Tiên Tiên	Semi-Final Wildcard
Episode 9 (17 November 2018)	Colors of life	Khắc Hưng & Bảo Anh	5	Trần Đặng Phương Vy	"All About That Bass" - Meghan Trainor	Safe
Episode 9 (17 November 2018)	Colors of life	Khắc Hưng & Bảo Anh	6	Nguyễn Văn Minh	"Rắc rối làm gì" - Khắc Hưng	Safe
Episode 9 (17 November 2018)	Colors of life	Khắc Hưng & Bảo Anh	7	Team Khắc Hưng & Bảo Anh: "Đơn giản" (Khởi My, Hoàng Rapper) / "Hát" (Võ Hạ Trâm)		
Episode 10 (24 November 2018)	Family relationships	Soobin Hoàng Sơn & Vũ Cát Tường	1	Đào Đình Anh Tuấn	"Cha" - Anh Tuấn, Karik	Safe
Episode 10 (24 November 2018)	Family relationships	Soobin Hoàng Sơn & Vũ Cát Tường	2	Nguyễn Hoàng Thiên Nga	"Chưa Bao Giờ Mẹ Kể" - Min & Erik St.319	Eliminated
Episode 10 (24 November 2018)	Family relationships	Soobin Hoàng Sơn & Vũ Cát Tường	3	Trần Ngọc Gia Hân	"Và em có anh" - Mỹ Tâm	Safe
Episode 10 (24 November 2018)	Family relationships	Soobin Hoàng Sơn & Vũ Cát Tường	4	Nguyễn Minh Nhật	"Em tôi" - Thanh Lam	Safe
Episode 10 (24 November 2018)	Family relationships	Soobin Hoàng Sơn & Vũ Cát Tường	5	Nguyễn Trần Xuân Phương	"Papa" - Hồng Nhung	Safe
Episode 10 (24 November 2018)	Family relationships	Soobin Hoàng Sơn & Vũ Cát Tường	6	Nguyễn Thị Hải Yến	"Gặp mẹ trong mơ" - Thùy Chi	Eliminated
Episode 10 (24 November 2018)	Family relationships	Soobin Hoàng Sơn & Vũ Cát Tường	7	Team Soobin Hoàng Sơn & Vũ Cát Tường: "Về nhà thôi" (Tăng Nhật Tuệ) / "Về nhà vui hơn" (Min)		
Episode 11 (1 December 2018)	Sơn Tinh – Thủy Tinh	Hồ Hoài Anh & Lưu Hương Giang^{1}	1	Trần Phi Hùng	"Rigoletto" (Vietnamese version)	Public's vote
Episode 11 (1 December 2018)	Sơn Tinh – Thủy Tinh	Hồ Hoài Anh & Lưu Hương Giang^{1}	2	Hà Trọng Vũ & Hà Trọng Sáng	"Uptown Funk" - Mark Ronson & Bruno Mars	Safe
Episode 11 (1 December 2018)	Sơn Tinh – Thủy Tinh	Hồ Hoài Anh & Lưu Hương Giang^{1}	3	Nguyễn Trần Phương Trúc	"Flashlight" - Jessie J	Safe
Episode 11 (1 December 2018)	Sơn Tinh – Thủy Tinh	Hồ Hoài Anh & Lưu Hương Giang^{1}	4	Lý Nguyễn Gia Hân	"Ben" - Michael Jackson	Safe
Episode 11 (1 December 2018)	Sơn Tinh – Thủy Tinh	Hồ Hoài Anh & Lưu Hương Giang^{1}	5	Nguyễn Thị Thanh Hằng	"Vì đâu" - Siu Black	Public's vote
Episode 11 (1 December 2018)	Sơn Tinh – Thủy Tinh	Hồ Hoài Anh & Lưu Hương Giang^{1}	6	Hà Quỳnh Như	"Cha và con gái" - Thùy Chi	Safe
Episode 11 (1 December 2018)	Sơn Tinh – Thủy Tinh	Hồ Hoài Anh & Lưu Hương Giang^{1}	7	Team Hồ Hoài Anh & Lưu Hương Giang: "On The Floor" (Jennifer Lopez ft. Pitbull)		

^1 Team Hồ Hoài Anh & Lưu Hương Giang received the most votes from the public, therefore had two contestants nominated for elimination saved.

=== Round 2: Top 14 (8 December) ===
The remaining 14 artists performed altogether at night 4 for the public's vote. At the end of the show, four artists received the fewest votes were eliminated.

Episode	Coach	Order	Artist	Song	Result
Episode 12 (8 December 2018)	Hồ Hoài Anh & Lưu Hương Giang	1	Lý Nguyễn Gia Hân	"Mùa thu vàng" - Minh Quân	Public's vote
Episode 12 (8 December 2018)	Khắc Hưng & Bảo Anh	2	Trần Đặng Phương Vy	"Chong chóng gió" - Lưu Hương Giang	Eliminated
Episode 12 (8 December 2018)	Soobin Hoàng Sơn & Vũ Cát Tường	3	Nguyễn Trần Xuân Phương	"Tóc hát" - Đoan Trang	Bottom two
Episode 12 (8 December 2018)	Hồ Hoài Anh & Lưu Hương Giang	4	Trần Phi Hùng	"I Believe I Can Fly" - R. Kelly	Eliminated
Episode 12 (8 December 2018)	Soobin Hoàng Sơn & Vũ Cát Tường	5	Trần Ngọc Gia Hân	"Lời mẹ hát" - Mỹ Linh	Eliminated
Episode 12 (8 December 2018)	Hồ Hoài Anh & Lưu Hương Giang	6	Nguyễn Thị Thanh Hằng	"Tự nguyện" - Hồ Quỳnh Hương	Bottom two
Episode 12 (8 December 2018)	Khắc Hưng & Bảo Anh	7	Nguyễn Văn Minh	"Billie Jean" - Michael Jackson	Public's vote
Episode 12 (8 December 2018)	Khắc Hưng & Bảo Anh	8	Phạm Minh Ngọc	"Ngẫu hứng sông Hồng" - Hồng Nhung	Public's vote
Episode 12 (8 December 2018)	Soobin Hoàng Sơn & Vũ Cát Tường	9	Nguyễn Minh Nhật	"Nhật ký cho ba" - Phương Mỹ Chi	Public's vote
Episode 12 (8 December 2018)	Hồ Hoài Anh & Lưu Hương Giang	10	Hà Quỳnh Như	"Hôm nay tôi buồn" - Phùng Khánh Linh	Public's vote
Episode 12 (8 December 2018)	Soobin Hoàng Sơn & Vũ Cát Tường	11	Đào Đình Anh Tuấn	"Gánh hàng rau" - Hà Anh Tuấn	Public's vote
Episode 12 (8 December 2018)	Hồ Hoài Anh & Lưu Hương Giang	12	Nguyễn Trần Phương Trúc	"Lửa không cháy trái tim của mẹ" - Ali Hoàng Dương	Public's vote
Episode 12 (8 December 2018)	Hồ Hoài Anh & Lưu Hương Giang	13	Hà Trọng Vũ & Hà Trọng Sáng	"H'ren lên rẫy" - Y Moan	Eliminated
Episode 12 (8 December 2018)	Khắc Hưng & Bảo Anh	14	Nguyễn Minh Chiến	"Ngắm hoa lệ rơi" - Châu Khải Phong	Public's vote

=== Round 3: Top 10 (15 December) ===
The remaining 10 artists performed altogether at night 5 for the public's vote. The bottom four artists were eliminated at the end of the night. During the fifth show, it was announced that the Semi-final Wildcard was awarded to Phạm Anh Khôi from team Khắc Hưng & Bảo Anh, after he received the most votes from the public via mobile app.

Episode	Coach	Order	Artist	Song	Result
Episode 13 (15 December 2018)	Hồ Hoài Anh & Lưu Hương Giang	1	Nguyễn Thị Thanh Hằng	"Nổi lửa lên em" - Huy Thục	Eliminated
Episode 13 (15 December 2018)	Khắc Hưng & Bảo Anh	2	Phạm Minh Ngọc	"Ba kể con nghe" - Thùy Chi	Eliminated
Episode 13 (15 December 2018)	Soobin Hoàng Sơn & Vũ Cát Tường	3	Nguyễn Minh Nhật	"Bốn chữ lắm" - Trúc Nhân & Trương Thảo Nhi	Eliminated
Episode 13 (15 December 2018)	Hồ Hoài Anh & Lưu Hương Giang	4	Lý Nguyễn Gia Hân	"Lời con hứa" - Thùy Chi	Eliminated
Episode 13 (15 December 2018)	Soobin Hoàng Sơn & Vũ Cát Tường	5	Nguyễn Trần Xuân Phương	"Phố cổ" - Thùy Chi, M4U	Public's vote
Episode 13 (15 December 2018)	Khắc Hưng & Bảo Anh	6	Nguyễn Minh Chiến	"Chờ người nơi ấy" - Uyên Linh	Public's vote
Episode 13 (15 December 2018)	Hồ Hoài Anh & Lưu Hương Giang	7	Nguyễn Trần Phương Trúc	"Hongkong1" - Nguyễn Trọng Tài / "Thằng điên" - JustaTee & Phương Ly	Public's vote
Episode 13 (15 December 2018)	Khắc Hưng & Bảo Anh	8	Nguyễn Văn Minh	"1+1" - Lê Thiện Hiếu (Sing My Song)	Public's vote
Episode 13 (15 December 2018)	Hồ Hoài Anh & Lưu Hương Giang	9	Hà Quỳnh Như	"Giữa Mạc Tư Khoa nghe câu hò Nghệ Tĩnh" - Ngọc Sơn	Public's vote
Episode 13 (15 December 2018)	Soobin Hoàng Sơn & Vũ Cát Tường	10	Đào Đình Anh Tuấn	"Hồ trên núi" - Anh Thơ	Public's vote

=== Round 4: Semifinals- Top 7 (22 December) ===
The Semifinal was recorded live, featuring competition performances from the remaining 7 artists for the public's vote as well as performances with guest artists. Because of force majeure reasons, coach Hồ Hoài Anh could not attend the Semifinal and was replaced by the show's music executive Lưu Thiên Hương. At the end of the night, the three artists that received the most votes from the public were automatically sent through to the Grand Finale, while the fourth finalist who was saved by Wildcard would be announced on Tuesday, December 25. The recipient of the Finals Wildcard was Nguyễn Minh Chiến from team Khắc Hưng & Bảo Anh.

Episode	Coach	Order	Artist	Song	Result
Episode 14 (22 December 2018)	Soobin Hoàng Sơn & Vũ Cát Tường	1	Nguyễn Trần Xuân Phương	"Nếu tôi được trở lại" - Lưu Hương Giang	Public's vote
Episode 14 (22 December 2018)	Hồ Hoài Anh & Lưu Hương Giang	2	Nguyễn Trần Phương Trúc	"Con yêu mẹ" - Vũ Thảo My	Eliminated
Episode 14 (22 December 2018)	Khắc Hưng & Bảo Anh	3	Nguyễn Minh Chiến	"Bùa yêu" - Bích Phương	Finals Wildcard
Episode 14 (22 December 2018)	Hồ Hoài Anh & Lưu Hương Giang	4	Hà Quỳnh Như	"Chuồn chuồn ớt" - Ngọc Khuê / "Ra ngõ mà yêu" - Trần Thu Hà	Public's vote
Episode 14 (22 December 2018)	Khắc Hưng & Bảo Anh	5	Phạm Anh Khôi	"Chạy" - Phùng Khánh Linh	Eliminated
Episode 14 (22 December 2018)	Khắc Hưng & Bảo Anh	6	Nguyễn Văn Minh	"Lý quạ kêu" (Traditional)	Eliminated
Episode 14 (22 December 2018)	Soobin Hoàng Sơn & Vũ Cát Tường	7	Đào Đình Anh Tuấn	"Buổi sáng ở Ciao Cafe" - Hà Anh Tuấn	Public's vote

Non-competition performances
Order	Performers	Song
14.1	Ali Hoàng Dương & the top 7	"Ngày mai" - Tóc Tiên
14.2	Hà Quỳnh Như, Nguyễn Trần Phương Trúc & Hồng Thắm	"Huyền Thoại Mẹ" - Trịnh Công Sơn / 'Công cha nghĩa mẹ" - Nhật Kim Anh
14.3	Nguyễn Minh Chiến & Phương Mỹ Chi	"Gợi nhớ quê hương" - Phi Nhung / "Quê em mùa nước lũ" - Phương Mỹ Chi
14.4	Nguyễn Văn Minh, Phạm Anh Khôi & Phan Mạnh Quỳnh	"Nắng mùa hạ" - Phan Mạnh Quỳnh
14.5	Đào Đình Anh Tuấn, Nguyễn Trần Xuân Phương, Dương Ngọc Ánh & Đỗ Thị Hoài Ngọc	"Yêu đời" - MTV Band / "Rong chơi" - Hà Anh Tuấn
14.6	Erik	"Cổ tích"

=== Round 5: Finals- Top 4 (29 December) ===
The Live Final was recorded live on 29 December 2018. Each finalist performed two times: a solo song and a duet song with his/her coach. The contestant who received the most votes from the public would be crowned the winner.

Hà Quỳnh Như from team Hồ Hoài Anh & Lưu Hương Giang was crowned winner after scoring 37.98% of the public vote, followed by Đào Đình Anh Tuấn from team Soobin Hoàng Sơn & Vũ Cát Tường with 35.76%, Nguyễn Minh Chiến from team Khắc Hưng & Bảo Anh with 13.31% and Nguyễn Trần Xuân Phương from team Soobin Hoàng Sơn & Vũ Cát Tường with 12.95%.

Episode	Coach	Artist	Order	Solo Song	Order	Duet Song (with coach)	% Vote	Result
Episode 15 (29 December 2018)	Hồ Hoài Anh & Lưu Hương Giang	Hà Quỳnh Như	1	"Trên đỉnh Phù Vân" - Mỹ Linh	6	"Tết Xuân" - Hồ Hoài Anh (with Hồ Hoài Anh & Lưu Hương Giang)	37.98%	Winner
Episode 15 (29 December 2018)	Khắc Hưng & Bảo Anh	Nguyễn Minh Chiến	2	"Chỉ riêng mình ta" - Nguyễn Hưng	5	Medley of Trịnh Công Sơn songs: "Nắng thủy tinh" / "Biết đâu nguồn cội" (with Bảo Anh)	13.31%	Third place
Episode 15 (29 December 2018)	Soobin Hoàng Sơn & Vũ Cát Tường	Nguyễn Trần Xuân Phương	3	"Sắc màu" - Trần Thu Hà	8	"The Party Song" - Vũ Cát Tường (with Vũ Cát Tường)	12.95%	Fourth place
Episode 15 (29 December 2018)	Soobin Hoàng Sơn & Vũ Cát Tường	Đào Đình Anh Tuấn	4	"Quê hương Việt Nam" - Anh Khang / "Về quê ăn Tết" - JustaTee	7	"Chuyến đi của năm" - Soobin Hoàng Sơn (with Soobin Hoàng Sơn)	35.76%	Runner-up

Non-competition performances
Order	Performers	Song
15.1	Trần Minh Như	"How Far I'll Go"
15.2	Trần Ngọc Ánh	"Khát khao chiến thắng"

== Elimination chart ==
Artist's info

- Artist from Team Soobin Hoàng Sơn & Vũ Cát Tường
- Artist from Team Hồ Hoài Anh & Lưu Hương Giang
- Artist from Team Khắc Hưng & Bảo Anh

Result details

- Winner
- Runner-up
- Third place
- Fourth Place
- Artist was saved by Wildcard
- Artist was saved by the public
- Artist was saved by his/her coach
- Artist was eliminated

Live show results per week
Artist	Week 1–3	Week 4	Week 5	Wildcard	Semi-Finals	Finals
Hà Quỳnh Như	Safe	Safe	Safe	—N/a	Safe	Winner
Đào Đình Anh Tuấn	Safe	Safe	Safe	—N/a	Safe	Runner-up
Nguyễn Minh Chiến	Safe	Safe	Safe	—N/a	Safe	Third place
Nguyễn Trần Xuân Phương	Safe	Safe	Safe	—N/a	Safe	Fourth place
Nguyễn Trần Phương Trúc	Safe	Safe	Safe	—N/a	Eliminated	Eliminated (Semi-Final)
Nguyễn Văn Minh	Safe	Safe	Safe	—N/a	Eliminated	Eliminated (Semi-Final)
Phạm Anh Khôi	Eliminated	Eliminated (Week 1–3)		Safe	Eliminated	Eliminated (Semi-Final)
Nguyễn Minh Nhật	Safe	Safe	Eliminated	Not Chosen	Eliminated (Wildcard)	
Nguyễn Thị Thanh Hằng	Safe	Safe	Eliminated	Not Chosen	Eliminated (Wildcard)	
Phạm Minh Ngọc	Safe	Safe	Eliminated	Not Chosen	Eliminated (Wildcard)	
Lý Nguyễn Gia Hân	Safe	Safe	Eliminated	Not Chosen	Eliminated (Wildcard)	
Trần Đặng Phương Vy	Safe	Eliminated	Eliminated (Week 4)	Not Chosen	Eliminated (Wildcard)	
Trần Phi Hùng	Safe	Eliminated	Eliminated (Week 4)	Not Chosen	Eliminated (Wildcard)	
Hà Trọng Vũ & Hà Trọng Sáng	Safe	Eliminated	Eliminated (Week 4)	Not Chosen	Eliminated (Wildcard)	
Trần Ngọc Gia Hân	Safe	Eliminated	Eliminated (Week 4)	Not Chosen	Eliminated (Wildcard)	
Nguyễn Thị Bảo Anh	Eliminated	Eliminated (Week 1–3)		Not Chosen	Eliminated (Wildcard)	
Nguyễn Thị Hải Yến	Eliminated	Eliminated (Week 1–3)		Not Chosen	Eliminated (Wildcard)	
Nguyễn Hoàng Thiên Nga	Eliminated	Eliminated (Week 1–3)		Not Chosen	Eliminated (Wildcard)	

== Contestants who appeared on previous shows or seasons ==
- Nguyễn Lê Minh Nguyên and Phạm Lê Quốc Hưng both competed on season 5 of The Voice Kids and joined team Vũ Cát Tường, but were eliminated at the Battles.
- Phạm Minh Ngọc and Nguyễn Minh Nhật both competed on season 4 and 5 of The Voice Kids respectively, but failed to make a team.
- Trần Ngọc Gia Hân and Nguyễn Trần Phương Trúc both competed on season 5 of The Voice Kids and joined team Hương Tràm & Tiên Cookie, but were eliminated at the Battles.
- Phạm Ngọc Thiên Thanh competed on season 5 of The Voice Kids and joined team Soobin Hoàng Sơn, but was eliminated at the Battles.
