= Sweet 20 =

- Em là bà nội của anh
- Directed by: Phan Gia Nhat Linh
- Screenplay by: Phan Gia Nhat Linh; Nguyen Thai Ha
- Based on: Miss Granny (2014)
- Produced by: Nguyen Quang Dung; Vu Quynh Ha
- Starring: Miu Le; Ngo Kien Huy; Hua Vi Van; Thanh Nam; Minh Duc; Hari Won
- Cinematography: Diep The Vinh
- Edited by: Andy Nguyen; Quyen Ngo
- Music by: Tang Nhat Tue; Nguyen Hai Phong
- Production companies: CJ Entertainment; HKFilm
- Distributed by: CJ CGV
- Release date: December 11, 2015
- Running time: 127 minutes 137 minutes (Tet version)
- Country: Vietnam
- Language: Vietnamese
- Box office: US$4.76 million

Sweet 20 (Vietnamese: Em là bà nội của anh; lit. 'you are my grandmother') is a 2015 Vietnamese fantasy romantic comedy film directed by Phan Gia Nhat Linh and starring Miu Le, Ngo Kien Huy, Hua Vi Van, Minh Duc, Thanh Nam and Hari Won. The directorial feature debut of the director, the film is a remake of the 2014 South Korean film Miss Granny (2014). It was released in Vietnam on December 11, 2015. It became the highest-grossing Vietnamese film at the Vietnamese box office.

== Plot ==
=== Plot introduction ===
A 70 year old grandma sees failure in her life and goes to take her funeral photo before she becomes old and ugly. She awakes as the 20 year old young lady she was in her youth. Seeking to enjoy her second chance she goes out to do what she wants living her new life without regrets.

=== Main plot ===
Mrs. Dai is a 70 year old grandma who is living with her only son Quang and his family including his wife Vy, two grandchildren Nhon and Tung. Mrs. Dai had been struggling with her life ever since. However, she has a good friend often takes care of her who is Mr. Be. During this time, a TV channel is looking for new talents as producer Manh Duc and his assistant Min Ji have been searching for the best voice out there, however, nothing has progressed. Mrs. Dai visits a photography shop to shoot one portrait in case she will pass away. While preparing for the photoshoot, a miracle turns her into a 20 year old version of herself. She doesn't realize this incident until she is on the bus.

Due to the new appearance, she is unable to come back home. Therefore, she takes a new name as Thanh Nga and rents a room in Mr. Be's house. She firmly decides to make use of her new appearance to make her dream of becoming a singer come true. Thanh Nga hangs out at a club of elders and performs "Diem Xua". Her voice immediately impresses everyone including Tung, Mr. Be and Manh Duc. Later, Tung invites her to be the vocal of his band of which she agrees, she even changes the style of Tung's band.

Tung's music band signs up for the talent show and they are chosen by Manh Duc. Mr. Be finds Mrs. Dai's belonging in Thanh Nga's room which leads him to instantly assume that Thanh Nga has murdered Mrs. Dai. He plans to tie up Thanh Nga so he can question her regarding the situation of Mrs. Dai, however, Mr. Be is caught and tied by Thanh Nga. She reveals that she is Mrs. Dai but only younger. This is shocking to Mr. Be however he promises to keep this as a secret. Tung's musicband have an opportunity to perform in a liveshow, Thanh Nga sings "Con tuoi nao cho em" which greatly touches the audience.

Next day, Manh Duc and Min Ji take Thanh Nga, Mr. Be, Tung and his band to the pool. At the pool, Thanh Nga preaches a teenager about the respect toward the elder. As they come back home, Mr. Be discovers that Thanh Nga will get older as she bleeds. However, Mr. Be's daughter who is Duyen angrily tells Thanh Nga to leave her house for wrongly assuming that her father and Thanh Nga are having an affair. Thanh Nga has to temporarily sleep at Manh Duc's house which makes Tung jealous without knowing that is his grandmother. While Manh Duc is also growing his feeling for Thanh Nga.

Tung and his band again have an opportunity to perform in another liveshow. Tung comes back home to collect his late grandfather's hat, though showtime is coming closer. As he is on his way to the show, a truck hits him and he is rushed to the hospital afterward. Thanh Nga will be performing "Minh Yeu Tu Bao Gio" which is composed by Tung before heading off to the hospital to check his situation. The show is a big success eventually. Thanh Nga agrees to donate her blood for Tung. After being done, youthful Thanh Nga turns back to 70 year old Mrs. Dai. After a while, Nhon is the vocal of Tung's musicband as a replacement for Thanh Nga. Mrs. Dai's family go to the liveshow of Nhon and Tung. The movie ends as Mrs. Dai steps out of the theater and happily smiling as she stares at Manh Duc.

== Cast ==
- Miu Le as Thanh Nga (a 20-year-old Mrs. Dai): a 20 year old lady who owns a great voice, however she still portrays old features of an old lady such as the maturity, high-temper and overly comfortable. Being young again helps her make her dream come true. Later, to save her grandson, she donates her blood and comes back to the old shape of a 70-year-old grandmother.
- Minh Duc as Mrs. Dai (Đại): a widowed 70-year-old grandmother who raised her son by herself. She doesn't get along well with her daughter-in-law and others. Actually, she loves them and always put them before herself, however due to her high temper, they keep misunderstanding her.
- Ngo Kien Huy as Tung (Tùng): Mrs. Dai's grandson who loves music and composing, a guitarist and a leader of music band Bay Cho Hoang (Wild Dogs). However, his songs are not catchy and often fail. Until meeting Thanh Nga - his 20-year-old grandmother, that makes him change his music style. Wild Dogs get to perform at big concerts and his song "Minh Yeu Tu Bao Gio" becomes a hit.
- Hua Vi Van as Manh Duc (Mạnh Đức): a young and handsome producer director. He is drawn to Thanh Nga's voice and personality and has feelings for her.
- Thanh Nam as Mr. Be (Bé): Mrs. Dai's long-term friend who's secretly in love with her since they were younger. He always protects her when in trouble as well as shows his affection for her. He's the first one to discover that Mrs. Dai will be older if she bleeds.
- Thu Trang as Duyen (Duyên): Mr. Be's daughter who competes with Thanh Nga for Mr. Be's attention.
- Hari Won as Min Ji: Manh Duc's assistant who tries to capture Manh Duc's attention. She sees Thanh Nga as her enemy in love.
- Leu Phuong Anh as Nhon: Mrs. Dai's granddaughter who graduated music major but still unemployed. She envies Thanh Nga so she starts behaving impolitely. However, toward the end, she becomes the vocal of Tung and his music band as a replacement for missing Thanh Nga.
- Hong Anh as Mrs. Vy: Mrs. Dai's daughter-in-law. She's a housewife and often tolerates her mother-in-law.
- Duc Khue as Mr. Quang: Mrs. Dai's only son. Understanding his mother's sacrifice, he's tried to study to become a professor. Mrs. Dai loves to show off her son with others.
- Kim Xuan as Mrs. Xuan (Xuân): a childish yet old lady who tries to act younger and sexy even than her real age. She likes Mr. Be and often tries to catch his attention.
- Trung Dan as Pharmacy owner
- Phi Phung as Underwear shop owner
- Ngan Quynh as Doctor
- Vo Ngoc Trai as Teenager on the bus
- Annie Huynh Anh as Lady on the bus
- Duy Khanh Zhou Zhou as MC
- Dam Phuong Linh as MC
- David Pham as A thug at the pool
- Harry Lu as Mrs. Dai's husband
- Ha Linh as Photographer
- Hong Tham as Mrs. Bao Tien
- Trong Hieu Idol as young Mr. Be

== Reception ==
The film overtook Let Hoi Decide on February 17 to become the highest-grossing Vietnamese film at the Vietnamese box office, with a box office gross of US$4.76 million. The film also overtook Yellow Flowers on the Green Grass to become the most popular Vietnamese film in 2015.
