= Phạm Quỳnh Anh =

Vietnamese singer (born 1984)

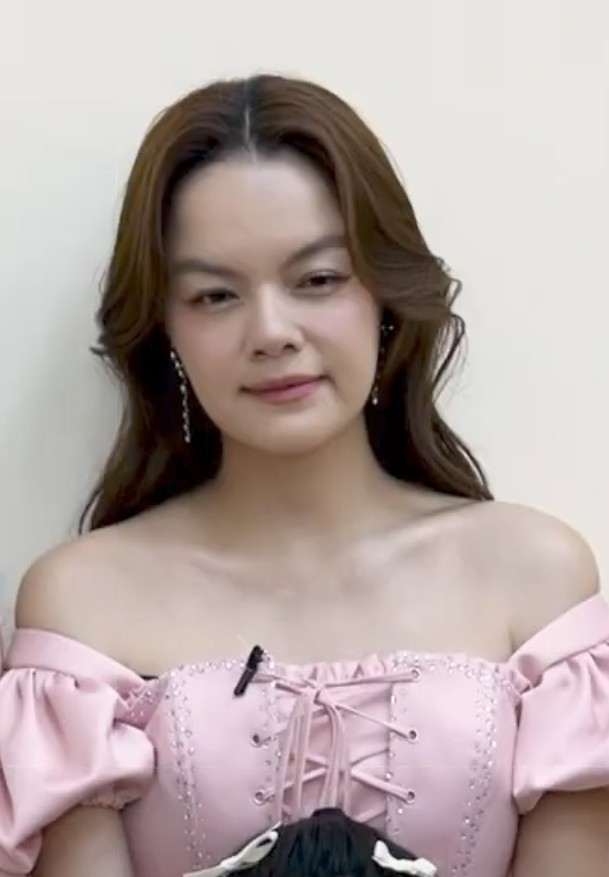
- Phạm Quỳnh Anh in 2024

Background information
- Born: 24 August 1984 (age 42)
- Origin: Hanoi, Vietnam
- Genre: Pop
- Occupations: Singer
- Instruments: Singing
- Spouse: Quang Huy (m. 2012; div. 2018)

Phạm Quỳnh Anh (born 24 August 1984 in Hanoi) is a Vietnamese singer. She is the former member of the Sắc Màu and H.A.T girl groups. Her songs targets at young audiences which are mostly ballad songs, such as Không Đau Vì Quá Đau, Càng Xa Càng Nhớ, Bụi Bay Vào Mắt, Người Dưng Ngược Lối,...

== Career ==
=== 1997-2004: Joining many girl groups and success with HAT. ===
In 1997, she started her career by joining Sắc Màu girl group which included 4 members but it was disbanded later. During that time, Sắc Màu girl group was the first music band ever to lead the pop trend in Hanoi.

After the disband of Sắc Màu, she moved to Hồ Chí Minh City and signed contract with Thế Giới Giải Trí (WePro Entertainment) which is an entertainment and talent agency in 2004, where she has been collaborating ever since.

In 2004, she joined girl group H.A.T with members Lương Bích Hữu and Thu Thủy. H.A.T was planned to be active for only 6 months but the success was beyond the expectations of WePro Entertainment.

When she was still a member of H.A.T, she with H.A.T and Ưng Hoàng Phúc visited as well as participated in some concerts and talk shows of TVB channel (Hongkong), especially X'Mas 2004 show which was aired on TVB.

=== 2005-present: Solo activity and acting ===
In 2005, she began solo career and marked this new chapter by releasing many hits such as Không Đau Vì Quá Đau, Bụi Bay Vào Mắt, Tình Yêu Cao Thượng, Đêm,...

In 2006, she launched a campaign to gift 10,000 DVD named 10,000 DVD - Millions of Thanks.

In November 2006, while she was filming for, she was diagnosed with harmless tumor and later got surgery immediately.

Targeting at young audience, she managed a young and energetic image and gained certain success. In December 2006, she released debut album Hoa Quỳnh Anh and 25,000 copies was sold.

In July 2008, she released album Vol. 2 Nợ Ai Đó Cả Thế Giới and more than 8,000 copies was sold, some songs was topped in many top ten music charts.

In 2010 after 2-year hiatus, she had a comeback with the album Người Dưng Ngược Lối which was composed by herself. Later, she officially made a comeback at many music show as well as denied the rumor that she had had to give birth in that 2-year hiatus.

In August 2013, after 1 year marriage and giving birth to the first child, she came back with the single Mỗi Thứ Em Thêm Vào Tình Yêu which was composed by Hamlet Trương.

In 2013, she joined a small role in the movie Than Tuong which was produced by WePro and directed by Quang Huy. Her role was the mother of main role played by Harry Lu. She also presented the song Buổi Chiều Hôm Ấy which was composed by songwriter Đằng Phương, lyrics by Thái Thịnh.

In 2014, she starred in the movie Chàng Trai Năm Ấy directed by Quang Huy, as well as the executive producer of the movie. Her role was the member of a music band including Sơn Tùng MTP, Hứa Vĩ Văn, Hari Won and Ngô Kiến Huy. She also presented the soundtrack Hạnh Phúc Mới featuring Hari Won.

In October 2016, she released the single Chỉ Cần Anh Hạnh Phúc which was written by Đằng Phương and Thái Thịnh.

In July 2017, she joined first ever music show to perform the song Cám Ơn of late singer Wanbi Tuấn Anh as a dedication of 4 year after his death. They were best friends when the singer was still alive.

In 2018, she collaborated with singer Hoang Hiep for the project Lam Phương - The Gift. This was her first time performing Lam Phương.

=== Music production ===
In 2017, she was the producer of Mùa Hè Không Độ music festival for the second time.

== Personal life ==
On May 10, 2012, she got married with producer, director and also director of WePro Entertainment - Quang Huy.

In November 2012, she gave birth to the first child and named her Tue Lam, nickname at home as Bella. In August 2017, they welcomed second daughter and named her An. In many interviews, she shared that after getting married and having kids, she mainly spent time for family.

In October 2018, she confirmed the rumor that she had divorced with her husband after 1 year living apart.

== Albums ==
- Hoa Quỳnh Anh (vol.1)
- Nợ ai đó cả thế giới (vol.2) (2007)
