= Miu Lê =

Vietnamese singer and actress (born 1991)

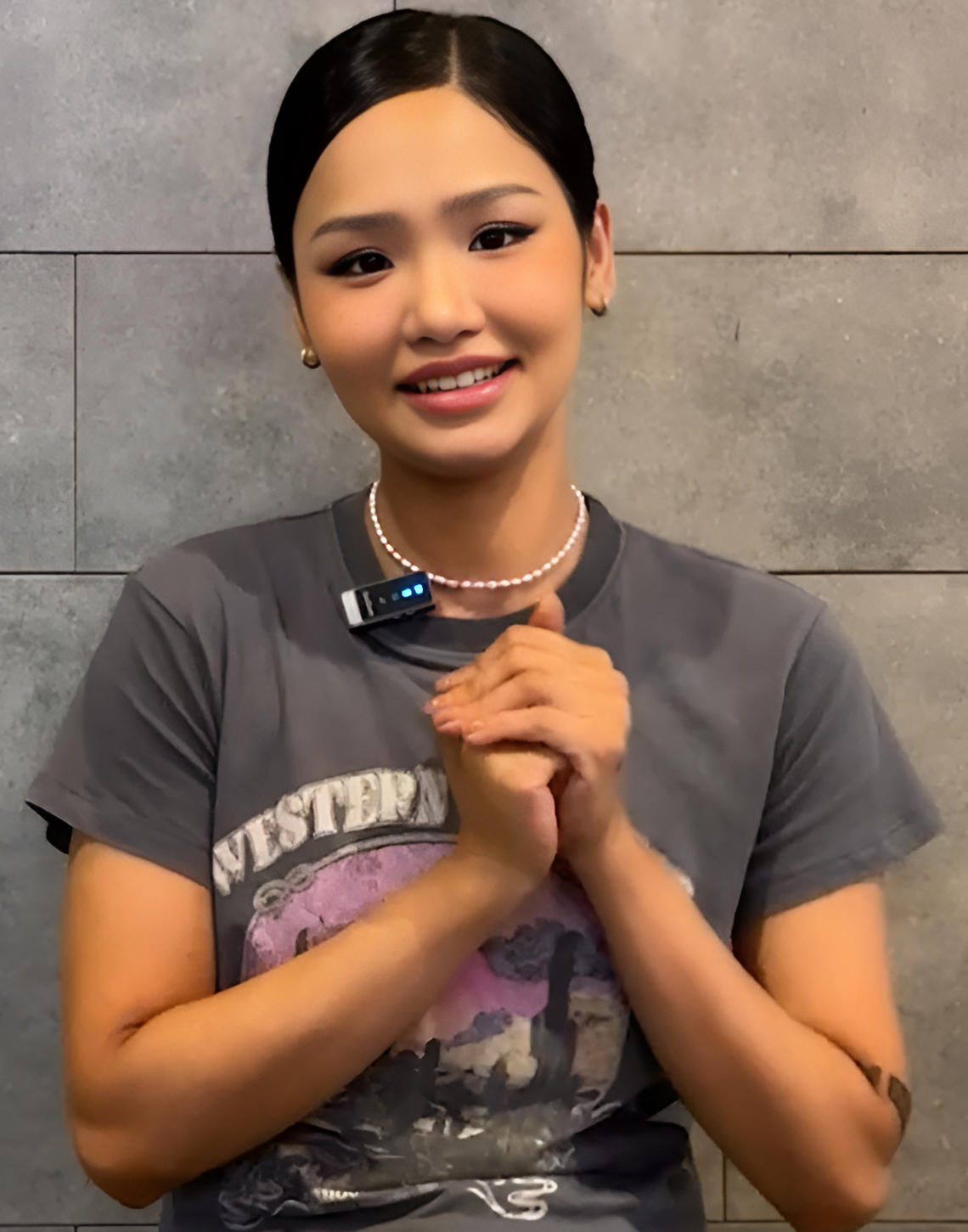
- Miu Lê in 2026
- Born: Lê Ánh Nhật; 5 July 1991 (age 35); Khánh Hoà, Vietnam
- Occupations: Singer & actress
- Years active: 2009–2026

Lê Ánh Nhật (born July 5, 1991), known professionally as Miu Lê, is a Vietnamese singer and actress. She was born in Khánh Hoà and attended Võ Thị Sáu High School in Ho Chi Minh City. In 2025, Miu Lê joined TV show Say Hi with Queens (Em xinh "say hi").

== Songs ==
- Riêng mình em
- Giấc mơ thần tiên
- Ngày mới ngọt ngào
- Không còn nhau
- Mình từng yêu nhau
- Quà cho anh
- Quên như chưa từng yêu
- Đừng bắt em phải quên
- Vụt tan đi
- Yêu một người có lẽ
- Anh đang nơi đâu
- Còn gì giữa chúng ta
- Mình yêu từ bao giờ

Title	Year	Peak chart positions		Album	Ref
Title	Year	VN Hot 100	VN Top Vietnamese	Album	Ref
"Muốn (Wanna)"	2018	(Note: Billboard Vietnam was launched on 14 January 2022.)		Non-album single	
"Giá Như Cô Ấy Chưa Xuất Hiện"	2019	(Note: Billboard Vietnam was launched on 14 January 2022.)		Non-album single	
"Còn Thương Thì Không Để Em Khóc"	2019	(Note: Billboard Vietnam was launched on 14 January 2022.)		Non-album single	
"Vì Mẹ Anh Bắt Chia Tay" (feat. Karik)	2022	1	1	Non-album single	
"Cô Đơn Đã Quá Bình Thường"	2023	TBA	TBA	Non-album single	

== Filmography ==
- Những thiên thần áo trắng
- Những giấc mơ hồng
- Thiên sứ 99
- Gia đình dấu yêu
- Oan gia đại chiến
- Tối nay, 8 giờ!
- Ice Age: Continental Drift
- Nhà có năm nàng tiên – Five Fairies in the House
- Yêu anh, em dám không?
- The Smurfs 2
- Inside Out
- Em là bà nội của anh – Sweet 20
- Ice Age: Collision Course
- Bạn gái tôi là sếp – She's the Boss
- Cô gái đến từ hôm qua – The Girl from Yesterday
- Nắng 2
