= The Girl from Yesterday =

2017 film

- Based on: Novel The Girl from Yesterday
- Narrated by: Ngô Kiến Huy
- Cinematography: Diệp Thế Vinh
- Edited by: hamziga
- Distributed by: CJ Entertainment
- Release date: July 21, 2017
- Running time: 120 minutes
- Country: Vietnam
- Language: Vietnamese
- Budget: 22 billion Vietnamese Dong

The Girl from Yesterday (Vietnamese title: Cô gái đến từ hôm qua) is a Vietnamese romantic comedy film directed by Phan Gia Nhat Linh, based on the novel of the same name by writer Nguyen Nhat Anh. The film was released on July 21, 2017. The film stars Ngô Kiến Huy, Miu Lê, Jun Phạm, Hoàng Yến Chibi and Lê Hạ Anh.

== Plot ==
The plot begins in Southern Vietnam, 1997, revolving a student named Thu. The film begins when Thu is a child, soon fast forwarding to when he is ten years old. During his childhood years, Thu makes friends with Tieu Ly, a little girl who lives next door. Young Thu prides himself on his cleverness, and while he generally gets along with Tieu Ly, he often playfully bullied her. Eventually, Tieu Ly and her family moves away, and Thu is heartbroken. He kept a secret notebook serving as a keepsake of his relationship with Tieu Ly.

Further down the road, an older Thu develops feelings for another girl in his class named Viet An. He borrows a book from her and writes song lyrics in it. Upon discovering the lyrics, Viet An tells Thu to get her a new book. Thus, Thu borrows another book and stays up late to finish it, as Viet An wanted him to give it back to her as soon as possible. In addition, Thu knew that Viet An likes candy, and hence decided to purchase candies for her every day. However, Viet An had two close friends, Chieu Minh and Hong Hoa. Thu had to buy candies for all three of them, and this caused the slow, yet fast depletion of his money.

Finding it difficult to win Viet An's heart, Thu asks for advice from his best friend Hai. Continuously, he failed in his pursuit to win Viet An's heart. Yet as Thu continues to fall for Viet An, he also began to miss Tieu Ly, his childhood friend. One day, Viet An became sick and was unable to attend school. Thus, Thu helped to voluntarily takes notes of all the lessons she missed, and went to visit her. As he focuses on writing the lesson notes for Viet An, he ended up neglecting his own lessons and was reprimanded by his teacher. His teacher then discovered a love poem Thu wrote about Viet An. Viet An was made aware of the situation and scolds Thu about the poem, but asks him to go to the movies with her anyway. Joyfully thinking that the date consisted of only the duo, Thu was shocked to find out that Viet An had asked her close friend, Hong Hoa to come along as well.

Other than the blooming romance between Thu and Viet An, the film also covers the love between Chieu Minh (close friend of Viet An's) and her Physical Education teacher, Luc. Chieu Minh had been diagnosed with an unpredictable heart defect, posing a challenge to the love between the couple. Aspiring to find the cure for Chieu Minh's condition, Luc brings her to the city for proper treatment.

Later on, Thu had a misunderstanding with Luc, leading to a fight between the two. The fight resulted in the suspension of Thu from school. After the suspension, Hai and Viet An went to Thu's house to teach him the lessons that he has missed. This helped Thu to keep up with his schoolwork, despite the suspension. Over time, Thu and Viet An become a couple, as do Thu's best friend, Hai, and Viet An's close friend, Hong Hoa. After a while, Thu brings Viet A home and decided to show her his secret notebook. However, a miscommunication occurred when Thu misunderstands that Viet An uses papers from his notebook to make paper boats. In frustration, he angrily told Viet An to leave his house. It was only later that he realized that the paper used to fold the paper boats were blank. Upon knowing this, Thu chases Viet An to get the notebook back. When they were on the bridge, Viet An reveals that she is, in fact, Tieu Ly, which surprises Thu. Thu is happy to realize that she is his childhood friend and soul-mate.

== Cast ==
- Ngo Kien Huy as Thu
  - Minh Khang as young Thu
- Miu Le as Viet An
  - Ha Mi as Tieu Ly / young Viet An
- Jun Pham as Hai
- Hoàng Yến Chibi as Hong Hoa
- Lê Hạ Anh as Chieu Minh
- Lan Phuong as Teacher Huong
- Tieu Bao Quoc as Teacher Hinh
- Tung Min as Teacher Luc
- Ha Linh as Thu's father
- Bao An as Phuong
- Van Anh as Tieu Ly's father
- Tu Vi as Tieu Ly's mother
- Truc Nhan as Mysterious teenager (cameo role)
