= H.A.T =

Vietnamese girl group

- Origin: Vietnam
- Genres: Pop; teen pop; V-pop; dance-pop
- Years active: 2004–2005, 2017, 2018
- Label: WePro Entertainment
- Past members: Lương Bích Hữu; Phạm Quỳnh Anh; Ngô Quỳnh Anh; Thu Thủy

H.A.T is a Vietnamese pop girl group formed in 2004. H.A.T consists of Lương Bích Hữu, Phạm Quỳnh Anh (Sắc Màu former member) and Thu Thủy (Mây Trắng former member). Thu Thủy was replaced by the Mắt Ngọc former member Ngô Quỳnh Anh, in 2004, after she left the group. During their career, H.A.T released two EPs, Anh không muốn bất công với em 2 – Best Collections (featuring Ưng Hoàng Phúc) and We Are H.A.T – Chúng tôi là H.A.T, both in 2004. The second album sold 30,000 units and became the best-selling album by a group in Vietnam at that time. After being an ambassador for the lipstick brand LipIce, H.A.T disbanded in 2005. In 2017, four members of H.A.T reunited to release the single "Gia đình tôi chọn", which marked 15-year anniversary since WePro was established.
