= Hoàng Yến Chibi =

Vietnamese singer

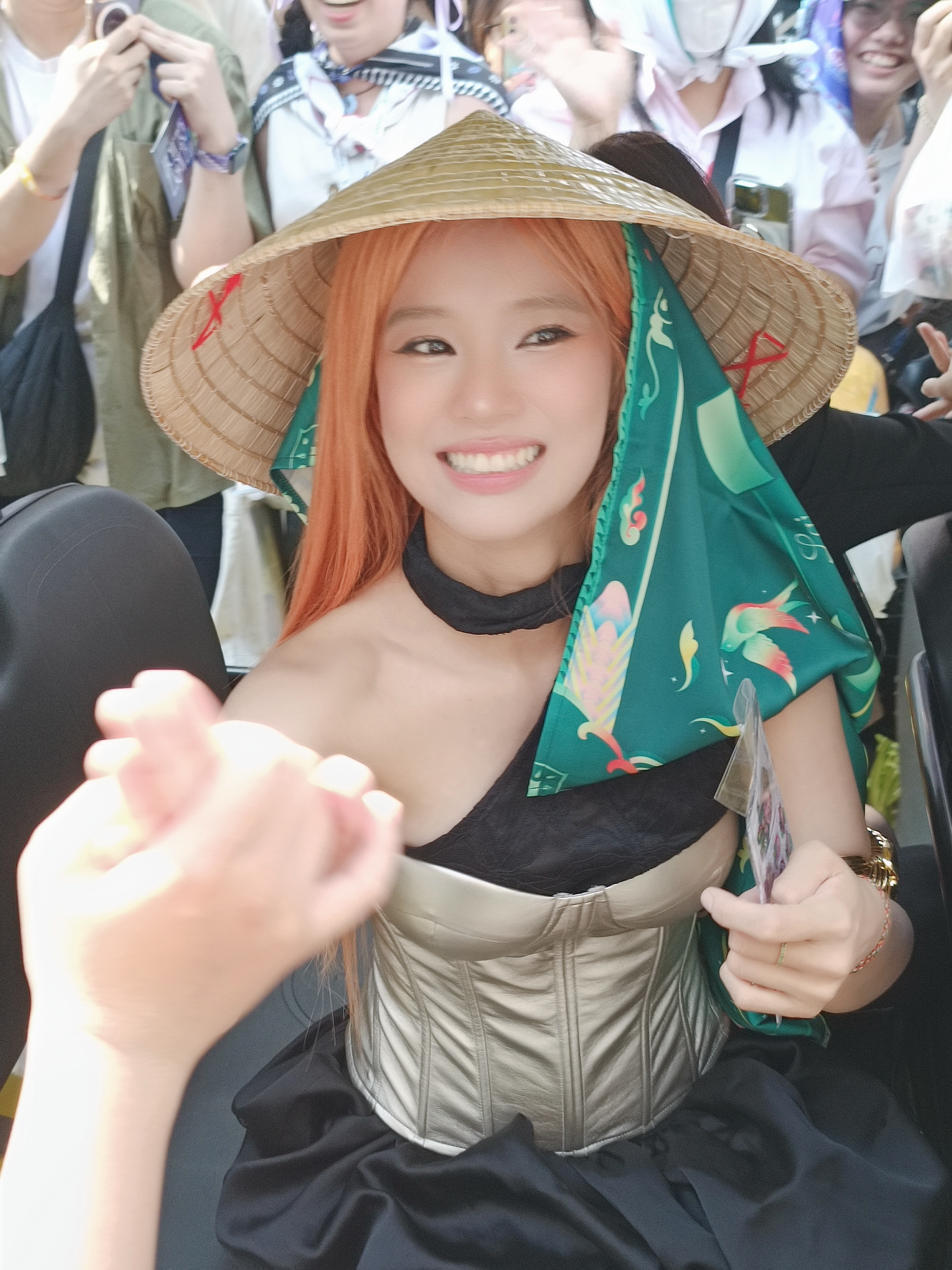
- Hoàng Yến Chibi in 2025
- Born: Nguyễn Hoàng Yến; 8 December 1995 (age 30); Hanoi, Vietnam
- Occupations: Singer, actress
- Years active: 2012–

Hoàng Yến Chibi (born 8 December 1995 in Hanoi) is a Vietnamese singer, actress and model.

== Life and career ==
Hoàng Yến Chibi was born in Hanoi, Vietnam on 8 December 1995. In 2014, she sang the song "Ngây ngô". Hoàng Yến Chibi won the second prize in the show "Học viện ngôi sao 2014" and the first prize in the show "Tôi là diễn viên 2015". She decided to pursue her singing career and acting career. Hoàng Yến Chibi moved to Ho Chi Minh City for living and working. She appeared in movies, television films and television shows.

== Songs ==
- Ngây ngô
- Ta nói nó dzui
- Lại gần em – Close to me
- Ngưng làm bạn
- Đồi hoa mặt trời
- By my side
- Anh nói em nghe đi
- Cinderella
- Bỏ mặc quá khứ
- Điều ngốc nghếch nhất
- Nụ hôn đánh rơi
- No boyfriend
- Thanh Xuân Của Cô Gái Nhà bên
- Cánh Hoa Tổn Thương
- Duyệt
- Ừ! Em xin lỗi

== Filmography ==
- Cửa sổ thủy tinh
- Trại cá sấu
- Gia đình ngũ quả
- Ám ảnh – Obsession
- Lộc phát
- Hot girl làm vợ
- Ngôi nhà bươm bướm
- Mãi mãi là bao lâu
- 4 năm, 2 chàng, 1 tình yêu (vi)
- The Girl from Yesterday Cô gái đến từ hôm qua (2017)
- Tháng năm rực rỡ (Go-Go Sisters)
- Kế hoạch đổi chồng

== Reality TV shows ==
- Chị đẹp đạp gió season 2

== Awards and nominations ==
=== Music ===
Year	Award	Category	Nominated work	Result	Ref.
2017	Green Wave (radio show)	Promising singer		Nominated	
2017	Zing Music Awards (vi)	Almost Favorite Singer		Nominated	
2018	Green Wave (radio show)	Favorite Song	Nụ hôn đánh rơi (vi)	Won	
2018	Green Wave (radio show)	Best New Face	Nụ hôn đánh rơi (vi)	Nominated	

=== Movie ===
Year	Award	Category	Nominated work	Result	Ref.
2017	Ngôi Sao Xanh (vi)	Award for Almost Favorite Actress	Hồng Hoa in The Girl from Yesterday movie	Won	
2018	Ngôi Sao Xanh (vi)	Award for Almost Favorite Actress	Hiểu Phương in Tháng năm rực rỡ movie (vi)	Won	
2018	Cánh diều vàng	Award for Best Actress	Hiểu Phương in Tháng năm rực rỡ movie (vi)	Won	
