= Lương Bích Hữu =

Vietnamese singer

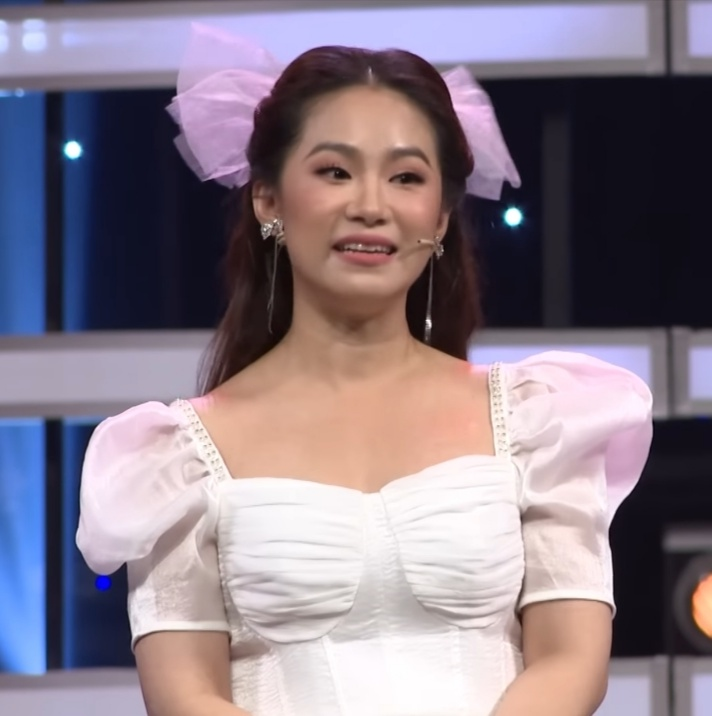
- Lương Bích Hữu in a show in 2022

Background information
- Also known as: A Mí; Chị Bảy
- Born: Lương Bích Hảo; 1 September 1984 (age 42); Ho Chi Minh City, Vietnam
- Origin: Guangdong, China
- Genre: Pop
- Occupations: actress, singer
- Years active: 2003–present
- Labels: Nguyễn Productions; Thế Giới Giải Trí; Khải Sao Entertainment; 3Em Entertainment
- Website: http://luongbichhuu.com.vn/

Lương Bích Hảo (chữ Hán: 梁碧好; born 1 September 1984), commonly known as Lương Bích Hữu, is a Vietnamese actress and pop singer. Before working with the Thế Giới Giải Trí, Lương Bích Hữu was one of the Nguyễn Productions singers. After working in the company and as member of girl group H.A.T., she returned to Nguyễn Productions and released her first solo album called "Cô gái Trung Hoa", which means "Chinese girl". It was the first solo album of a H.A.T member. In 2008 she briefly joined girl group Ngũ Long Công Chúa. After releasing her third album, she left Nguyễn Productions and founded her own company, Khải Sao Entertainment.

She made her acting debut in 2010 TV series "Màu Của Tình Yêu". Her second acting role is in TV series "Chuyện Tình Làng Hoa", which premiered on 22 April 2012. As of May 2016, she is CEO of limited company Fame High Import Export Service Trading Company Limited (Fame High Co., Ltd), which handle international trading.

== Education ==
After high school, she was admitted into the vocal department of Hồ Chí Minh City's Music Institute as she had dreamed to become the best vocal teacher so she could pursue music but not be a singer following her family's order.

== Career ==
In 2003, she participated in Television Voice contest and made it to the semi-final. Ever since, she was noticed by songwriter Vũ Hà and he invited to sign contract with Nguyễn Production where he was the director. However, in 2004, she left to join Thế Giới Giải Trí Company (WePro Entertainment) by songwriter Quang Huy. She was one of the member of HAT girl group included herself, Phạm Quỳnh Anh and Thu Thủy.

Shortly after, H.A.T was disbanded so she returned to Nguyễn Production and officially released the debut album Cô Gái Trung Hoa. Four of six songs was charted in top of many music streaming websites after 2 weeks.

On 28 July 2006, she held the first liveshow Cô Gái Trung Hoa (Chinese Girl).

On 3 January 2007, she released the second album Ây Da Ây Da.

Later, she joined another girl group named Ngũ Long Công Chúa that also included Yến Trang, Yến Nhi, Minh Trang and Bích Trâm, however the group was also disbanded after short time.

=== Independent activity ===
After the disband of Ngũ Long Công Chúa, her contract with Nguyễn Production also expired afterward, she refused to resign and began independent singer career.

On 2 December 2008, she released the third album "It's Not Over". 3000 copies was sold on the first day release.

In 2009, she established Khải Sao Entertainment and released DVD single Cô Gái Trung Hoa Trở Lại included some video clips for songs from the album Chưa Dừng Lại along the remix of Cô Gái Trung Hoa named Cô Gái Trung Hoa Trở Lại.

In 2010, she exclusively released the MV Story of Time on Yeah1TV which was about the timeline of a girl. Later, she had her first tour in Taipei and first acting as Hạnh Như in TV drama Mau Cua Tinh Yeu.

At the end of 2010, she released the album Gọi Mãi Tên Nhau included 7 songs from songwriters Nguyễn Hoàng Duy, Khoa Tất.

In 2011, she starred as Kim Ngọc in the drama Chuyện Tình Làng Hoa.

Later, she released the MV Em Đẹp Nhất Đêm Nay and new album Lương Bích Hữu Collection 2011 included 7 songs from different genres.

In October same year, she released three music projects at the same time: single Em Yêu Anh, single Quên Cách Yêu and album Cô Nàng Đẹp Trai and one minishow afterward. Besides, in Christmas, she also released the MV Tình Thương Mãi Mãi Đêm Giáng Sinh which had been filmed previously.

In 2013, she released the mini album Học Cách Đi Một Mình and the album Người Ta Từng Yêu featuring Tam Hổ band. Later, she continued to release the ballad Đứt Từng Đoạn Ruột right on her birthday. The single of the album won the Best Folk Song award of Zing Music Awards 2013 which was voted by the online audience.

Nearly the end of 2013, she released the single Có Kiếp Sau Không featuring and tried to experiment comedy by joining three comedies belonged to Nụ Cười Xuân show of comedian Nhat Cuong.

In 2014, she released the new album Anh Muốn Chia Tay Phải Không, single Vội Vã Yêu Nhau featuring Ngô Kiến Huy as their first ever collaboration and album Mình Cưới Nhau Nhé which was her first ever collaboration with Hồ Quang Hiếu.

In 2015, she released 2 mini albums named Em Chọn Cô Đơn and Đến Sau Phải Lau Nước Mắt while touring in Canada. After coming back from the tour in America, she released another new album Hữu Với Dance consisting of 6 old songs which were remixed by DJ Pho Nguyen. In September same year, she continued to release the new single Tình Yêu Trong Vòng Tay with Vietnamese and Chinese versions along with Chinese version MV. Shortly after, Vietnamese version MV was released.

In 2016, she ran many music projects by releasing single Người Ta Nói Đúng. In November same year, she released new single Vì Em Cố Chấp.

In 2017, she released the dance single Party Girl (one Vietnamese and one Chinese), there were also remixed old songs released at the same time. In October same year, she continued to release the new single Đắm Trong Cay Đắng which was specially written by a foreign songwriter for her.

In 2018, she released the MV Đắm Trong Cay Đắng which was remixed into ballad genre. In Lunar New Year, she released another single Hạnh Phúc Đầu Xuân which was composed by herself. In June, she released the single Mỉm Cười Cho Qua which was composed by Hamlet Trương. In November same year, single Anh Chưa Từng single was released as her first time collaboration with songwriter Vưong Anh Tú.

== Personal life ==
At Zing Music Awards 2014 on 5 January 2015 at Hoa Binh Theater (HCM City), singer Khánh Đơn suddenly proposed her although she was in Canada on a tour.

== Discography ==
=== Singles ===
- Cô Gái Trung Hoa Trở Lại, 2009
- Em Yêu Anh, 2012
- Quên Cách Yêu, 2012
- Hữu Với Dance (DJ Phơ Nguyễn), 2015
- Vì Em Cố Chấp, 2016
- Party Girl, 2017

=== Albums ===
- Cô gái Trung Hoa, 2005
- Ây Da Ây Da, 2007
- It's Not Over, 2008
- Cô Gái Trung Hoa Trở Lại, 2009
- Story Of Time, 2010
- Gọi Tên Nhau Mãi, 2011
- Lương Bích Hữu Collection 2011, 2011
- Em Yêu Anh, 2012
- Quên Cách Yêu, 2012
- Cô Nàng Đẹp Trai, 2012
- Học Cách Đi Một Mình, 2013
- Người Lạ Từng Yêu, 2013
- Đứt Từng Đoạn Ruột, 2013
- Tuyển Tập Những Ca Khúc Hay Nhất, 2013
- Anh Muốn Chia Tay Phải Không?, 2014

=== Compilations ===
- Lương Bích Hữu Collection 2011, 2011

== Filmography ==
=== TV series ===
- Màu Của Tình Yêu, 2010
- Chuyện Tình Làng Hoa, 2012
