= Thu Hiền =

Vietnamese singer

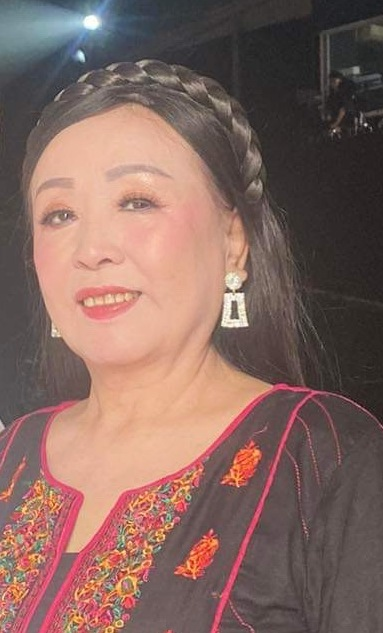

NSND Nguyễn Thị Thanh Hiền, also known by the stage name Thu Hiền (Đông Hưng, Thái Bình, 3 May 1952) is a Vietnamese traditional singer. She began by singing revolutionary songs, touring with field music troupe during the Vietnam War. Her performances mix accompaniment of traditional instruments such as đàn bầu and western keyboards.
