= Trọng Tấn =

Vietnamese singer and vocal music lecturer

Trọng Tấn is a Vietnamese singer and vocal music lecturer from Thanh Hóa. He specializes in traditional Vietnamese music and Vietnamese Red music.

Trọng Tấn started participating in arts performance and activities when he was still a student of Đào Duy Từ High School (Thanh Hóa). After finishing his high school studying, Trọng Tấn went to Hà Nội to apply for the entrance exam of Vietnam National Academy of Music. He passed the exam with the help of People's Artist Trần Hiếu, since the People's Artist discovered Tấn's talent. Trọng Tấn became well known after he received the First Prize of Good Singing Voice of Hanoi in 1997 and First Prize of National Good Singing Voice of Television in 1999. It is said that the audience was stingingly surprised when they heard the song "Tiếng đàn bầu"; some commented that Trọng Tấn is the best performer of "Tiếng đàn bầu" since the era of Kiều Hưng.

Trọng Tấn is also considered to be a diligent music student and singer; focusing on his skills.Tấn's diligence is admired by many of his students.

== Notable albums ==
- Một Chặng Đường
- Rặng Trâm Bầu
- Tình Yêu Trên Dòng Sông Quan Họ
