= Vũ Trọng Phụng =

Vietnamese writer (1912–1939)

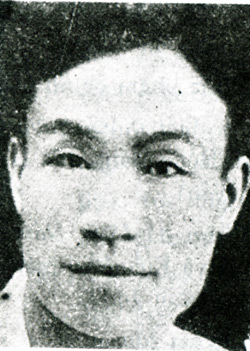
Vũ Trọng Phụng

Vũ Trọng Phụng (Hanoi, 20 October 1912 – Hanoi, 13 October 1939) was a popular Vietnamese author and journalist, who is considered to be one of the most influential figures of 20th century Vietnamese literature. Today, several of his works are taught in Vietnamese schools.

== Biography ==
Phụng's ancestral village was Hảo village, Mỹ Hào District, Hưng Yên Province, yet he was born, grew up, and died in Hanoi. The fact that his father died of tuberculosis when he was only seven months old resulted in Phụng's being brought up mainly by his mother. After finishing primary school, 16-year-old Vũ Trọng Phụng was forced to stop schooling and earn his own living. Phụng wrote prolifically during the 1930s, and "produced a body of writing that", according to historian Peter B. Zinoman, "stands today as the single most remarkable individual achievement in modern Vietnamese literature." Although he only wrote for a short span of time, with his first work being the short story Chống nạng lên đường ('Set off with crutches') on the newspaper Ngọ Báo in 1930, he had left an impressive collection of literature works: over 30 short stories, 9 novels, 9 reports, 7 plays, along with a translated play from French, some literature reviews and pieces of criticism, and hundreds of articles on matters of politics, society, and culture. Some excerpts from his publications, for example Dumb Luck (Vietnamese: Số Đỏ) and The Storm (Vietnamese: Giông Tố), became part of Vietnamese literature textbooks.

Famous for the satire in his works, Phụng was compared to Balzac by some critics. However, due to his "realistic" descriptions and heavy emphasis on sex, he was called to court by the French authorities in Hanoi for "outraging morality" (French: outrage aux bonnes moeurs). Later on, his works were prohibited from being published or read in North Vietnam because they were deemed "obscene publications" until the late 1980s. In 1939, he died from tuberculosis at the age of 26 (27 by the Vietnamese system of age reckoning), a week before his 27th birthday.

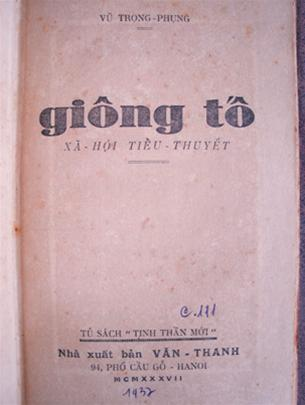
The peasant novel Giông Tố (The Storm), 1936

== Depictions of sex work ==
In 1937, Phụng wrote Lục Xì, a now-classic reportage (Vietnamese: phóng sự) on female sex work in colonial Hanoi. The work was originally published in a local newspaper (Tương Lai, 'Future') in a serialized format, before it was published as a book later that year. It was based on his observations of the practice and regulation of sex work in the city, as well as his visits to the municipal dispensary (Vietnamese: nhà lục xì, lit. 'the look-see house') where sex workers were treated for venereal diseases, which were only possible because municipal authorities wanted to showcase the city’s ostensible success in dealing with sex work to journalists and writers like Phụng. In Lục Xì, Phụng’s view is not simply that sex work was immoral, but that the outsize presence of sex work in Hanoi was a symptom of larger problems—such as exploitative or ineffectual colonial policies, materialistic attitudes, poverty, and the spread of venereal diseases—all of which stood in stark contrast to French claims that Vietnam was prospering under colonial rule. An English translation of Lục Xì by anthropologist Shaun Kingsley Malarney was published by University of Hawaiʻi Press in 2011.

Lục Xì was not Phụng’s first foray into writing about sex work; it was part of Phụng’s established interest in the topic. Before he wrote Lục Xì, he published a novel in 1936 (Làm Đĩ, 'Prostitute'). The novel contained a fictionalized account of how an upper-class woman becomes a sex worker, written in the style of social realism.

== Translations ==
- Vũ Trọng Phụng, Dumb Luck 1936 (translation: University of Michigan Press, 2002)
- Vũ Trọng Phụng, Lục Xì: Prostitution and Venereal Disease in Colonial Hanoi (translation by Shaun Kingsley Malarney: University of Hawaiʻi Press, 2011)
- Vũ Trọng Phụng, The Industry of Marrying Europeans (translation: Cornell South East Asian Program)
- Vũ Trọng Phụng, Making a Whore (translation by Đinh Ngọc Mai: Major Books, 2025)
