= Ngô Kiến Huy =

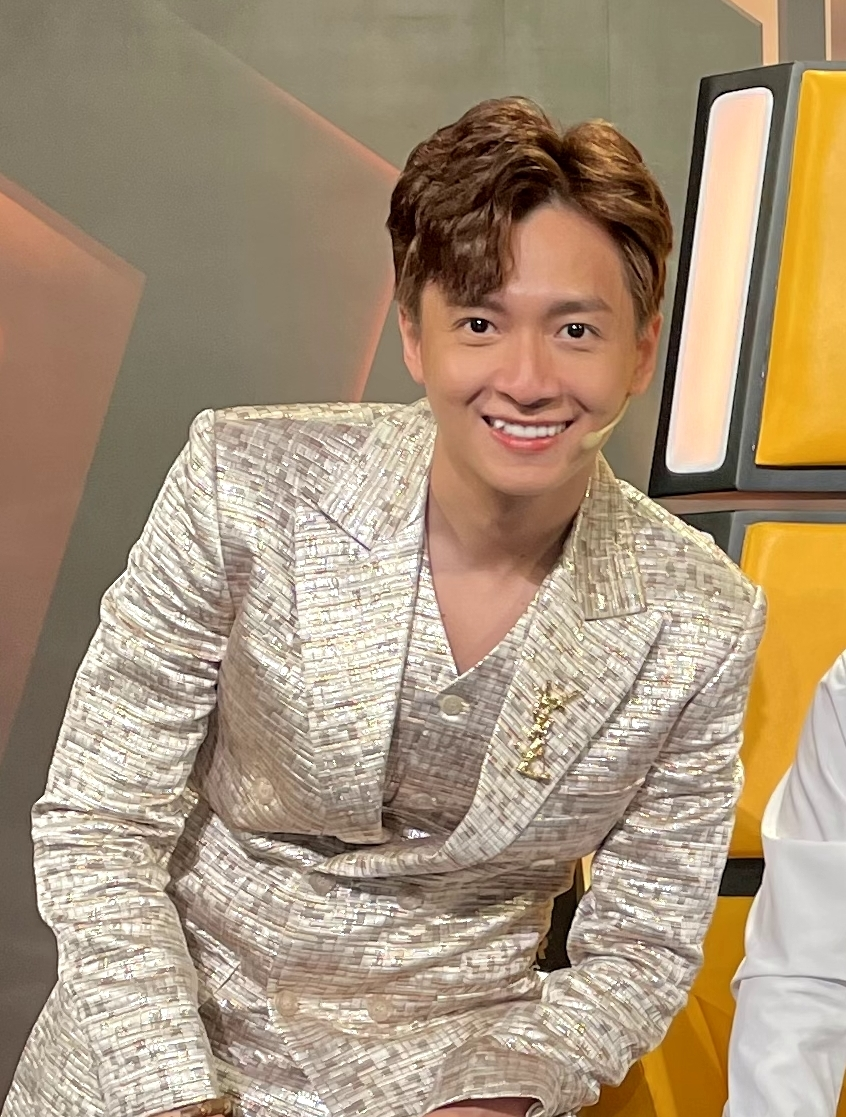
- Ngô Kiến Huy in 2021
- Born: Lê Thành Dương; 29 June 1988 (age 38); Ho Chi Minh City, Vietnam
- Other names: Bắp, Thỏ Đen, Bờm
- Occupations: Singer; actor; television host
- Years active: 2008–present
- Musical career
- Origin: Thanh Hóa, Vietnam
- Genres: Pop; Ballad; Dance
- Instrument: Vocals

Lê Thành Dương (born 29 June 1988), better known by his stage name as Ngô Kiến Huy, is a Vietnamese singer, actor and television host. Huy began his career in 2008 after he won the contest Vươn tới ngôi sao (Rising to Star). He has released five studio albums and over 40 singles, and won several awards.

For his film career, Huy starred roles in several critical acclaimed films such as Dandelion (2014), The Talent (2013), Sweet 20 (2015), The Girl from Yesterday and 49 Days 2 (2017). He also took role as a television host and hosted several shows such as The Masked Singer Vietnam and Crack Them Up.

== Biography ==
Ngô Kiến Huy, born Lê Thành Dương on June 29, 1988, in Ho Chi Minh City. He studied at the College of Culture and Arts, majoring in vocal music.

== Controversy ==
The singer was once involved in a scandal about having an extramarital child with Thụy Anh, the younger sister of artist Thanh Thảo. He was boycotted by the online community and had to work serving bubble tea and as an extra to make a living. Thụy Anh and Ngô Kiến Huy have a child together, named Jacky Minh Trí, born in 2011. Their child is currently being raised by artist Thanh Thảo.

== Reality TV show ==
Year	Program	Role	Broadcast	Source
2025	Anh trai "say hi"	Contestant season 2	HTV2	
