= Dumb Luck (novel) =

Book by Vũ Trọng Phụng

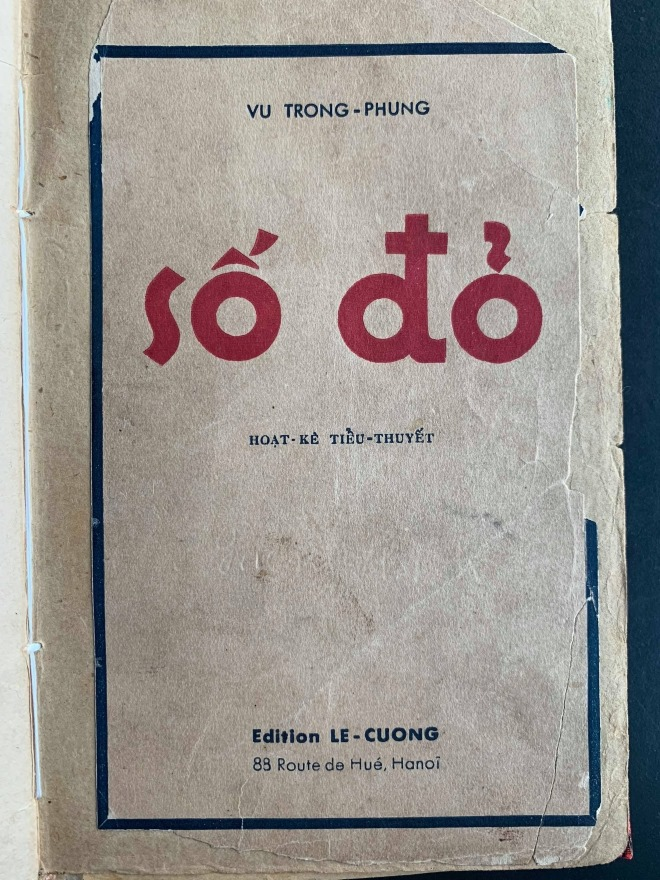
- Số Đỏ, 1936 version
- Author: Vũ Trọng Phụng
- Publication date: 1936
- Publication place: French Indochina (Vietnam) Việt Nam
- English publication date: 2002

Dumb Luck (Số đỏ) is a 1936 novel by the Vietnamese novelist Vũ Trọng Phụng. The novel is a contemporary critique on the Vietnamese late colonial society, satirizing the rising bourgeoisie. The main character of the story, Red-haired Xuân, himself a part of the lower class of society, was able to work his way up through the social ladder, quickly associating with the upper class connections and individuals through cunning works; all thanks to the then-popular Westernization social movement among the Hanoian petite bourgeoisie class in the 1920s. This movement is portrayed as immoral, in stark contrast to existing Vietnamese moral foundations.

Số Đỏ, among many other works of Vũ Trọng Phụng, was banned by the Vietnamese Communist Party, first in North Vietnam from 1960 to 1975, then throughout the unified Socialist Republic of Vietnam until 1986, due to the author's realistic depiction of sex which was considered inappropriate. Additionally, despite the novel's critique of women's modernization movement supporters, the novel contains disparaging and often graphic descriptions of female characters. An abridged version is also included in the literature curriculum for Vietnamese high schools.

Due to the complexities of the plot and the nature of the novel, most, if not all, of the main characters of this novel are antagonists.

== Translations ==
An English translation was published by the University of Michigan Press in 2002. A German translation was published by Tauland-Verlag.
