= 1820s =

Decade

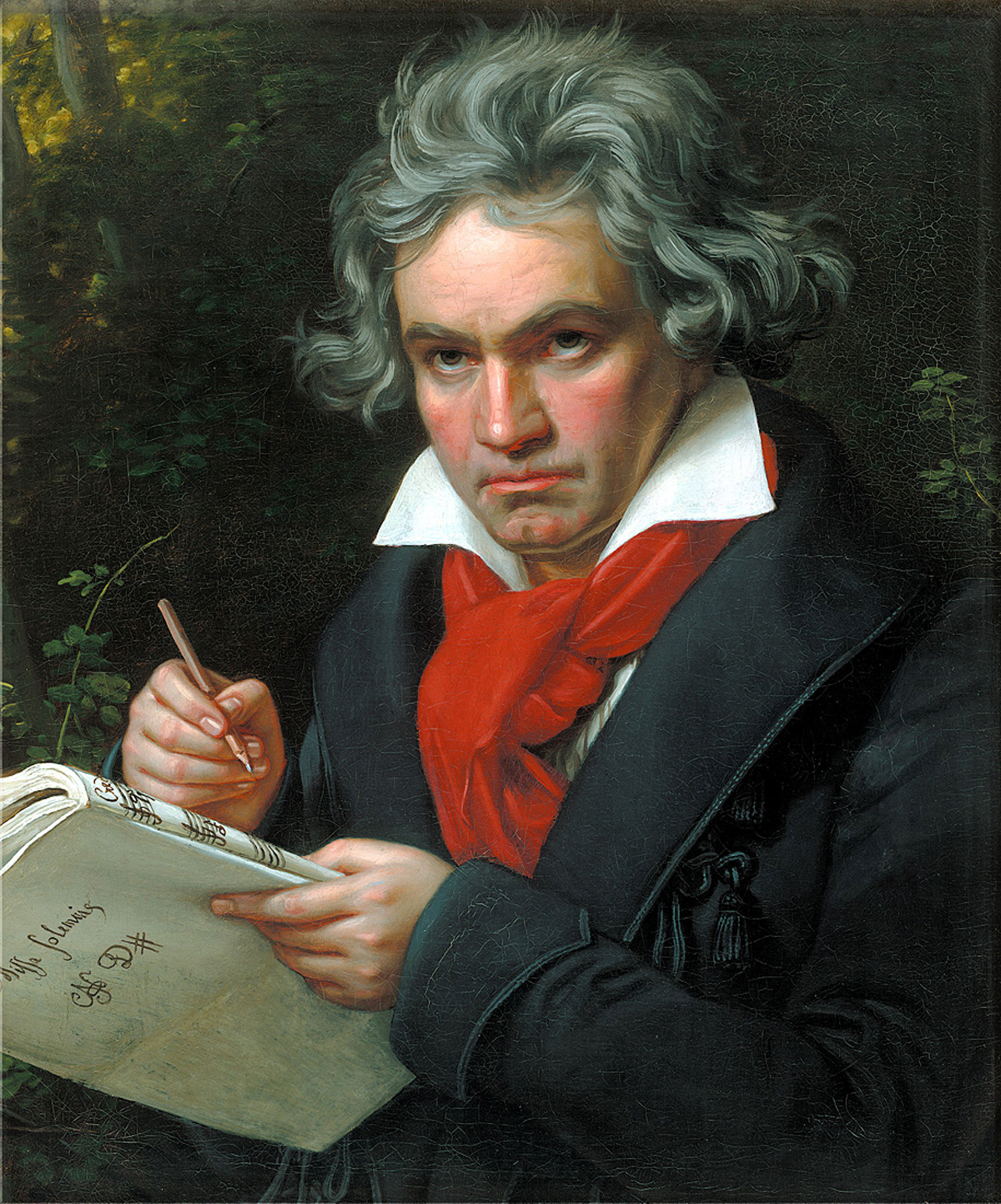
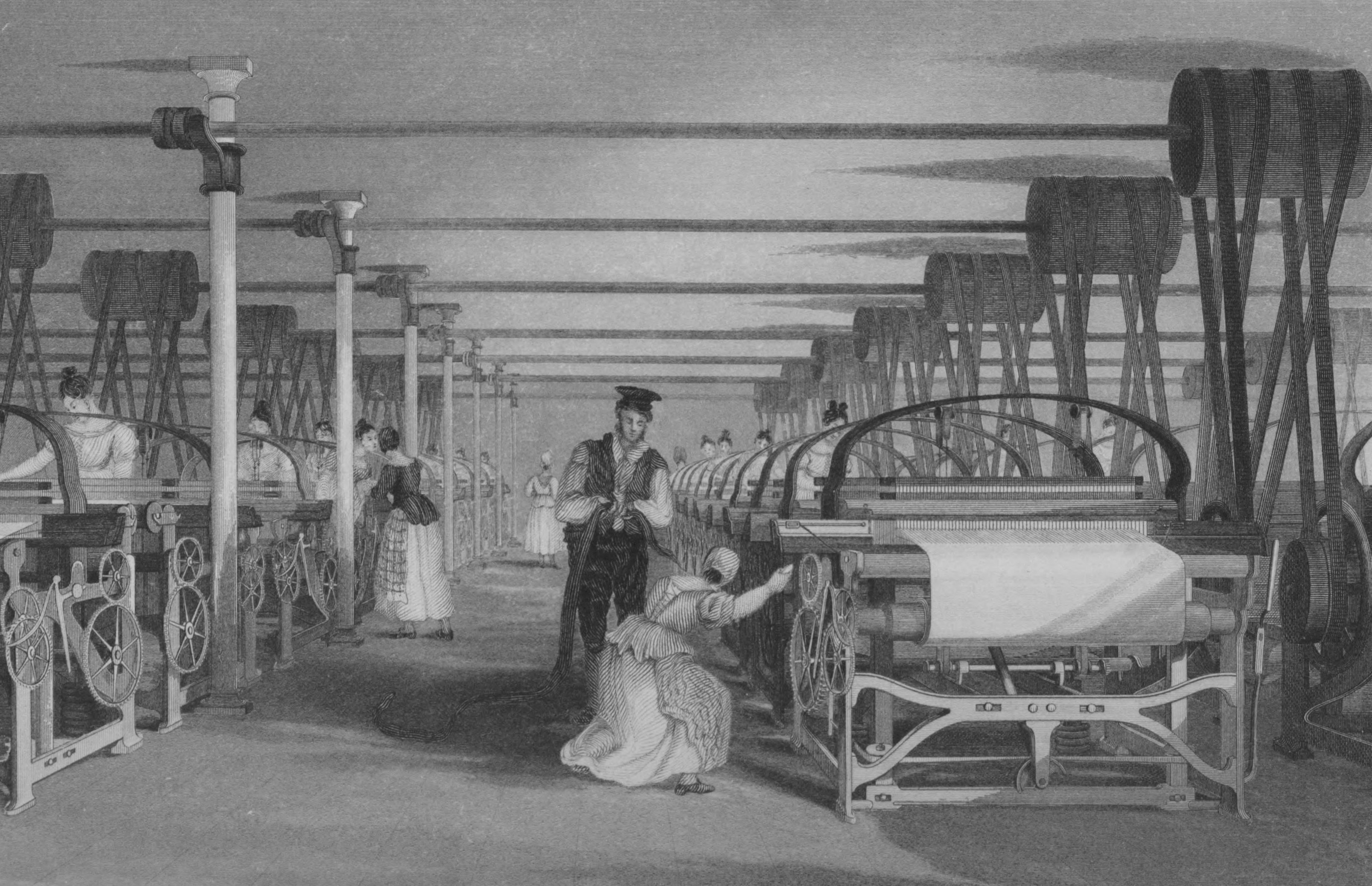
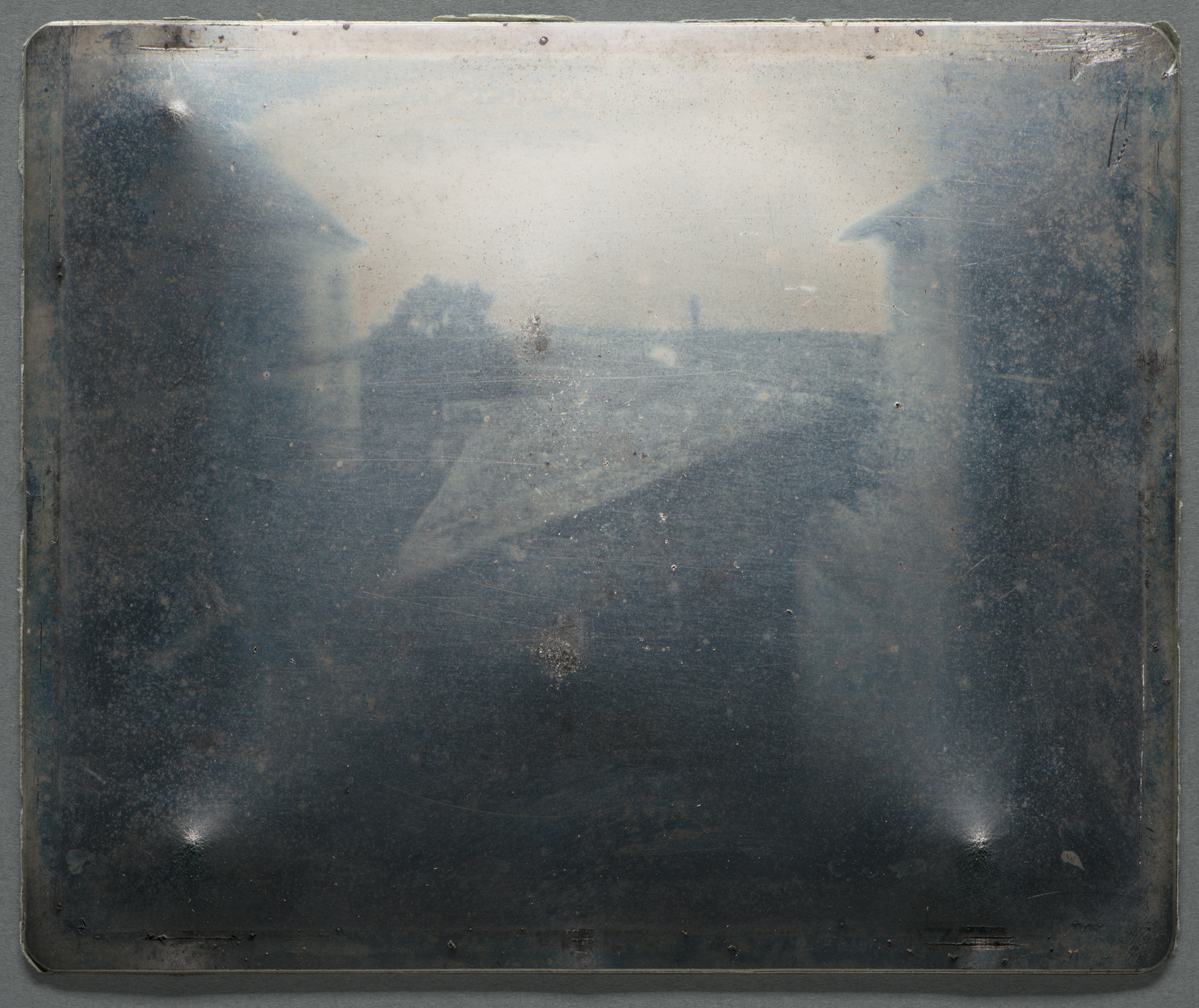
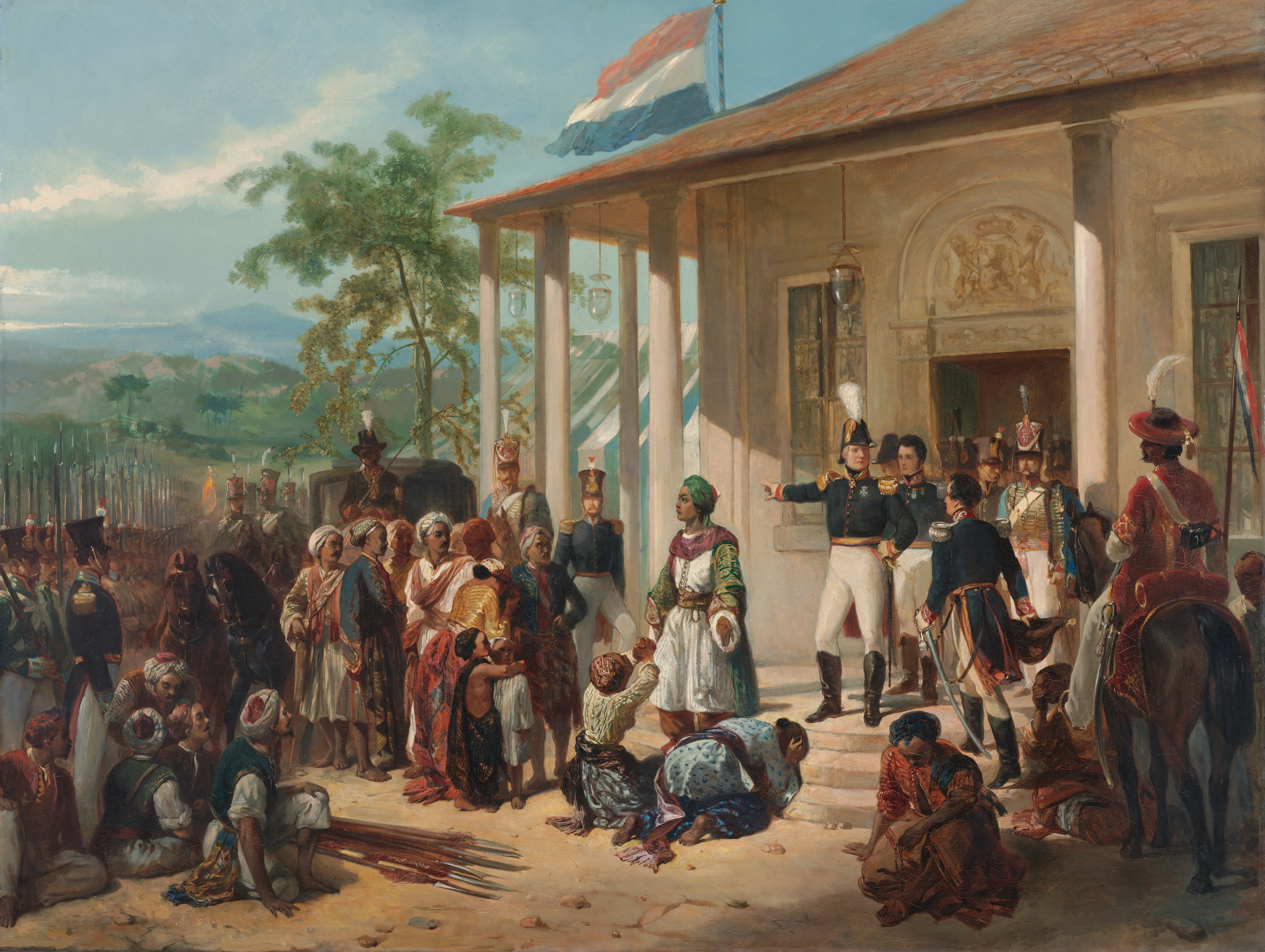
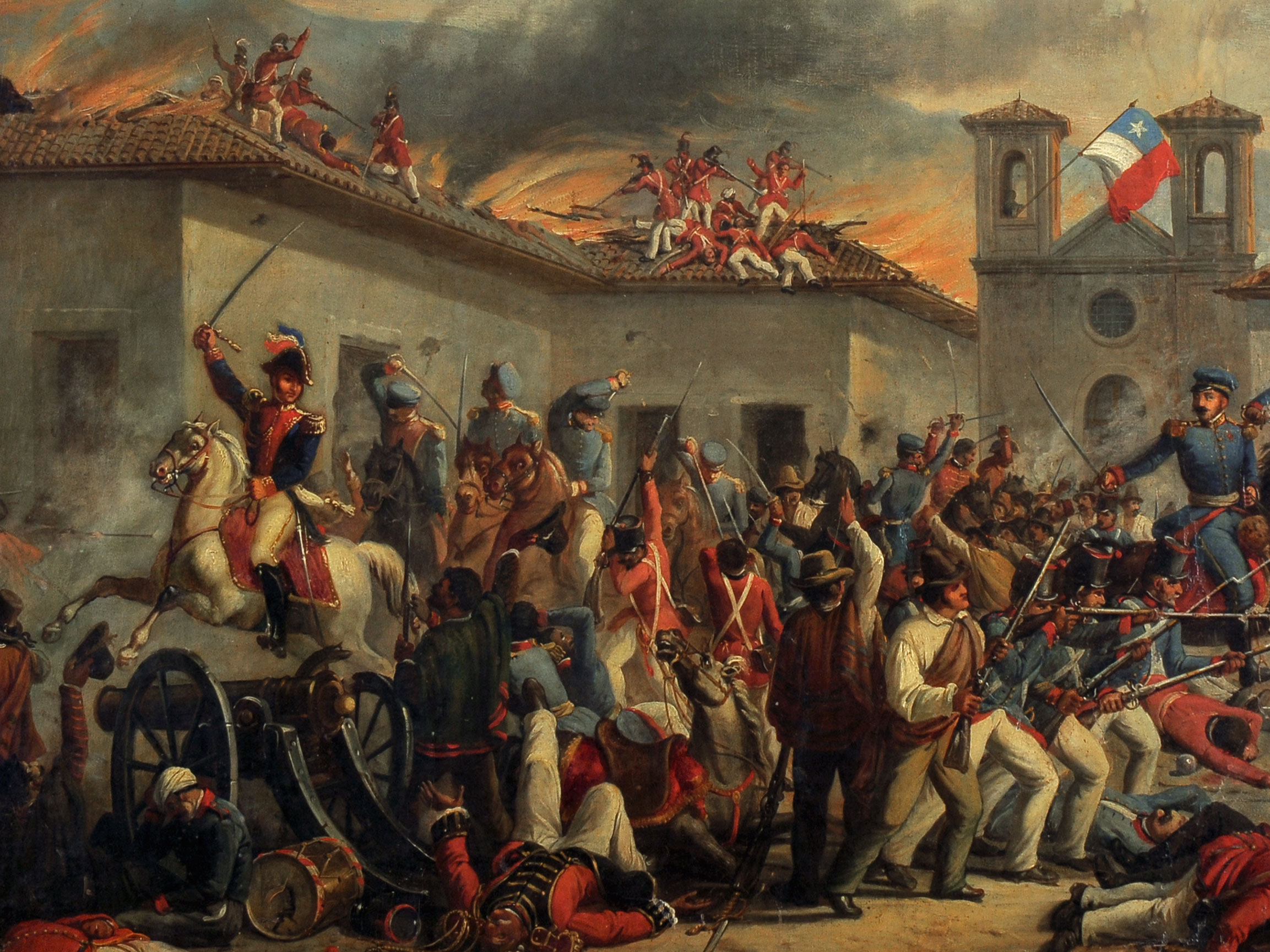
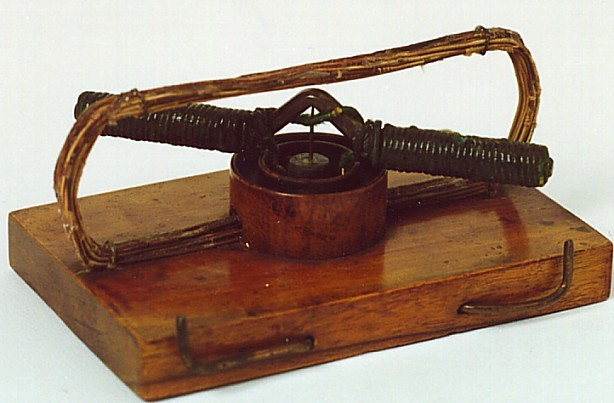
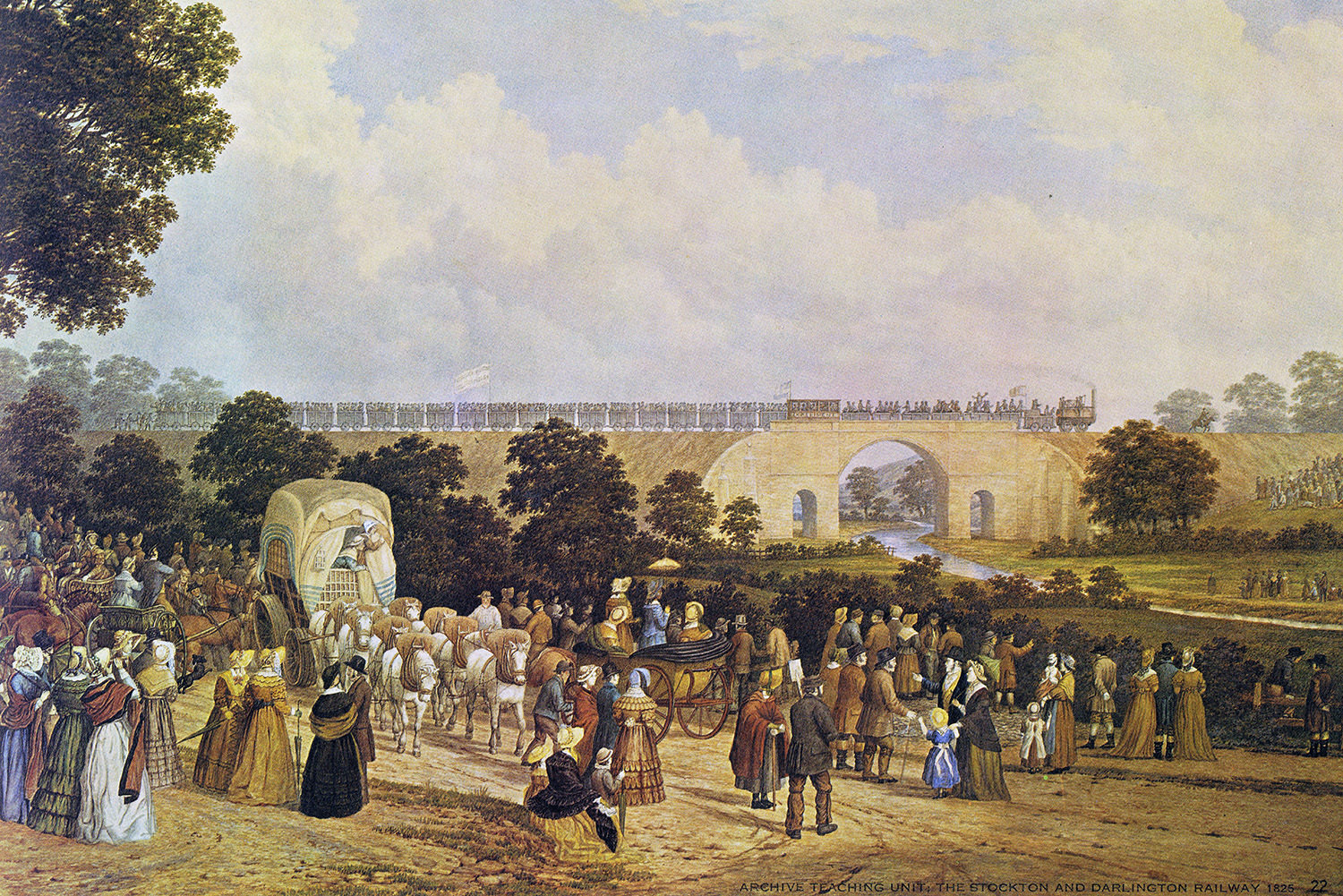
From top left, clockwise: Ludwig van Beethoven re-emerged as a popular composer during this decade, when his iconic Symphony No. 9 is first performed in Vienna in 1824. The First Industrial Revolution achieves peak momentum for the West, as depicted in this engraving of a textile factory operating in Manchester, arguably England's industrial hub of the 19th century; The world's oldest photograph was taken in 1826, as seen above. The decade was the start of daguerreotype development – an instrument used for motion-picture capturing and was a precursor instrument to the camera; South American wars of independence were on full swing, as countries like Brazil, Bolivia, Peru, and Uruguay gained their independence at this era; a turning point for regional politics, and heavily influenced South America's contemporary socio-political conditions; Crowds gather to witness the opening of the world's first railway – the Stockton and Darlington Railway – as it formally commenced in 1825; The world's first electric motor was created by Hungarian engineer Ányos Jedlik; Antarctica was discovered and explored for the first time. Its inaugural expedition into continental waters was led by a Russian crew headed by Fabian Gottlieb von Bellingshausen, in 1819 to 1821; As European colonialism began gaining ground in Africa and Asia, opposition resulted in conflicts such as the Java War.

The 1820s was a decade of the Gregorian calendar that began on January 1, 1820, and ended on December 31, 1829.

It saw the rise of the First Industrial Revolution. Photography, rail transport, and the textile industry were among those that largely developed and grew prominent over the decade, as technology advanced significantly. European colonialism began gaining ground in Africa and Asia, and trade with the Qing Dynasty began to open up more towards foreign traders, particularly those from Europe. As European imperialism opposition resulted in conflicts such as the Java War and the Greek War of Independence. Resistance in the form of separatism and nationalism (particularly in the Spanish American wars of independence) led to the independence of many countries around the world, such as Brazil, Peru, and Bolivia.

== Politics and wars ==
The Greek War of Independence and the Russo-Turkish War were two of the decade's more important conflicts. Meanwhile, colonialism in Africa had just begun to accelerate, and global trade between Asian powers (e.g. the Qing Dynasty) with European powers (mainly the British and French empires) increased substantially. In South America, states such as Bolivia, Peru, and Brazil gained independence from the Spanish Empire and Portuguese Empire.

=== Global ===
- 1820: Anchor coinage is issued for use in some British colonies.

=== East Asia ===
==== Indonesia ====
- 1824 – The Dutch sign the Masang Agreement, temporarily ending hostilities in the Padri War in West Sumatra.

===== Java War =====
The Java War (also known as the "Diponegoro War") was fought in Java between 1825 and 1830. It started as a rebellion led by Prince Diponegoro after the Dutch decided to build a road across a piece of his property that contained his parents' tomb.

The troops of Prince Diponegoro were very successful in the beginning, controlling the middle of Java and besieging Yogyakarta. Furthermore, the Javanese population was supportive of Prince Diponegoro's cause, whereas the Dutch colonial authorities were initially very indecisive. As the Java war prolonged, Prince Diponegoro had difficulties in maintaining the numbers of his troops. Prince Diponegoro started a fierce guerrilla war and it was not until 1827 that the Dutch army gained the upper hand. The Dutch colonial army was able to fill its ranks with troops from Sulawesi, and later on from the Netherlands.

The rebellion finally ended in 1830, after Prince Diponegoro was tricked into entering Dutch custody near Magelang, believing he was there for negotiations for a possible cease-fire. It is estimated that 200,000 died over the course of the conflict, 8,000 being Dutch.

==== Malaysia ====
- November 1821 - Siamese invasion of Kedah – The Siamese forces of King Rama II achieved a rapid victory against those of Sultan Ahmad Tajuddin Halim Shah II of Kedah, in what is now northern Malaysia. The campaign initiated a period of two decades in which Kedah resisted Siamese control. The Sultan took refuge on Penang Island, then under British control. By 1822 there was a rise in the population of the British territories caused by an influx of Malays displaced by the invasion.
- 1826 – The Burney Treaty allowed the Siamese view of their rights to prevail in Kelah.
- 1826 – The British crown colony of the Straits Settlements is established in what is now Malaysia and Singapore.

==== Vietnam ====
- February 14, 1820 – Minh Mang starts to rule in Vietnam.
- 1825 – Minh Mang outlaws the teaching of Christianity in Vietnam.

==== Laos ====
- 1827: King Anouvong of Vientiane declares war on Siam and successfully attacks Nakhon Ratchasima.
- 1828 Siamese-Lao War: The Siamese invade and sack the city of Vientiane.
- November 12, 1828: Anouvong is deposed and his kingdom is annexed by Siam. Large forced population transfers are made from Laos to the more securely held area of Isan, and the Lao mueang is divided into smaller units to prevent another uprising.

==== Burma ====
- 1824–1826: The First Anglo-Burmese War ended in a British victory, and by the Treaty of Yandabo, Burma lost territory previously conquered in Assam, Manipur, and Arakan. The British also took possession of Tenasserim with the intention to use it as a bargaining chip in future negotiations with either Burma or Siam.

==== Brunei ====
- 1826–1828: The Bruneian Civil War of 1826 began in 1826, ending in 1828 with the garrote of Muhammad Alam.

==== Siam (Thailand) ====
- 1824–1826 - Rattanakosin Kingdom (Siam): Rama II died in 1824 and was peacefully succeeded by his son Jessadabodindra (Rama III). In 1825 the British sent another mission to Bangkok led by East India Company emissary Henry Burney. They had by now annexed southern Burma and were thus Siam's neighbours to the west, and they were also extending their control over Malaya. The King was reluctant to give in to British demands, but his advisors warned him that Siam would meet the same fate as Burma unless the British were accommodated. In 1826, therefore, Siam concluded its first commercial treaty with a western power, the Burney Treaty. Under the treaty, Siam agreed to establish a uniform taxation system, to reduce taxes on foreign trade and to abolish some of the royal monopolies. As a result, Siam's trade increased rapidly, many more foreigners settled in Bangkok, and western cultural influences began to spread. The kingdom became wealthier and its army better armed.

=== Australia ===
- 1824 – The name Australia, recommended by Matthew Flinders in 1804, is finally adopted as the official name of the country once known as New Holland.
- September 13, 1824 – With his crew and 29 convicts aboard the Amity, John Oxley arrives at and founds the Moreton Bay Penal Settlement at what is now Redcliffe in Queensland, Australia, after leaving Sydney.
- December 25, 1826 – Major Edmund Lockyer arrives at King George Sound to take possession of the western part of Australia, establishing a settlement near Albany.
- June 3, 1829 – The Swan River Colony (later to become the cities of Perth and Fremantle) is founded in Western Australia. This secures the western 'third' of the Australian landmass for the British.
- August 12, 1829 – Mrs. Helen Dance, wife of the captain of the ship Sulphur, cuts down a tree to mark the day of the founding of the town of Perth, Western Australia.

=== Central Asia ===
- Caucasian War (1817–1864)
- 1826 – Britain annexes Assam.

=== South Asia ===
- Siege of Bharatpur – India (9 December 1825 – 18 January 1826) ended in British victory.
- December 4, 1829 – India: In the face of fierce opposition, British Lord William Bentinck carries a regulation declaring that all who abet sati in India are guilty of culpable homicide.

=== Western Asia ===
- October 1, 1827 – Russo-Persian War, 1826–1828: The Russians under Ivan Paskevich storm Yerevan, ending a millennium of Muslim domination in Eastern Armenia.
- February 22, 1828 –Treaty of Turkmenchay: Russian-Persian peace treaty: Russia captures Eastern Armenia from Persia.

=== Europe ===
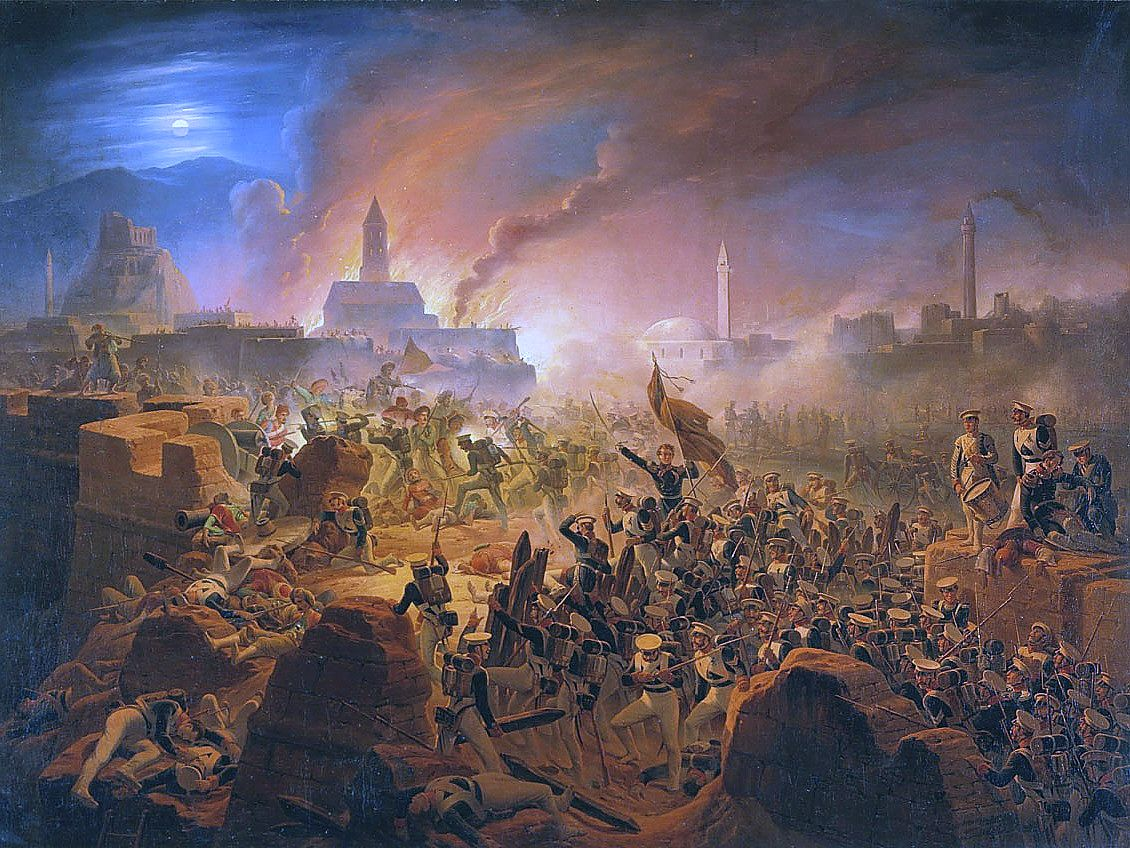
Russo-Turkish War

==== Eastern Europe ====
- April 6 1821 – The Greek War of Independence against the Ottoman Empire is proclaimed officially in South Greece.
- June 19, 1821 – The Philikí Etaireía are decisively defeated by the Ottomans at Drăgăşani (in Wallachia).
- December 1825 – The Decembrist Revolt breaks out in Russia, but is thoroughly suppressed.
- December 1, 1825 – Nicholas I of Russia succeeds his older brother Alexander I.
- June 14–June 15, 1826 – The Auspicious Incident: Mahmud II, sultan of Ottoman Empire, crushes the last mutiny of janissaries in Istanbul.
- September 29, 1828 – Russo-Turkish War, 1828–1829: Varna is taken by the Russian army.
- July 2, 1829 – Russo-Turkish War, 1828–1829: Russian Field-Marshal Hans Karl von Diebitsch launches the Transbalkan offensive, which brings the Russian army within 68 km of Istanbul.
- September 16, 1829 – Russo-Turkish War, 1828–1829: The Treaty of Adrianople gains for Russia some territory at the mouth of the Danube and along the eastern coast of the Black Sea.

==== Northern Europe ====
- February 3, 1825 – Vendsyssel-Thy, once part of the Jutland peninsula that formed westernmost Denmark, becomes an island after a flood drowns its 1 km wide isthmus.
- September 27, 1825 - The world's first modern railway, the Stockton and Darlington Railway, opens with engineer George Stephenson driving the first public train pulled by the steam engine Locomotion No 1.
- September 4, 1827 – Finland: The Great Fire of Turku destroys 3/4 of the city, with many human casualties.

==== Central Europe ====
- October 25, 1820 –November 20 – The Congress of Troppau (Opava) is convened between the rulers of Russia, Austria and Prussia.
- October–December, 1822 – Congress of Verona: Russia, Austria and Prussia approve French intervention in Spain.
- July 6, 1825 – The Duke of Schleswig-Holstein-Sonderburg-Beck gains possession of Glücksburg and changes his title to Friedrich Wilhelm, Duke of Schleswig-Holstein-Sonderburg-Glücksburg. The line of Schleswig-Holstein-Sonderburg-Glücksburg later becomes the royal house of Greece, Denmark and Norway.

==== Southern Europe ====
- January 1, 1820 – A constitutionalist military insurrection at Cádiz leads to the summoning of the Spanish Parliament (March 7) (see Mid-nineteenth century Spain).
- March 9, 1820 – King Ferdinand VII of Spain accepts the new constitution, beginning the Liberal Triennium ("Trienio Liberal").
- July 1820 – A Constitutionalist revolution occurs in the Kingdom of the Two Sicilies.
- August 24, 1820 – A Constitutionalist insurrection breaks out at Oporto, Portugal.
- September 15, 1820 – A revolution breaks out in Lisbon (see Portugal's crises of the Nineteenth Century).
- September 22, 1822 – Portugal approves its first Constitution.
- January 4, 1825 – King Ferdinand I of the Two Sicilies is succeeded by his son Francis I of the Two Sicilies.
- May 28, 1826 – Pedro I of Brazil abdicates as King of Portugal.
- June 23, 1828 – Portugal: King Miguel I overthrows his niece Queen Maria II, beginning the Liberal Wars.

===== Greek War of Independence =====
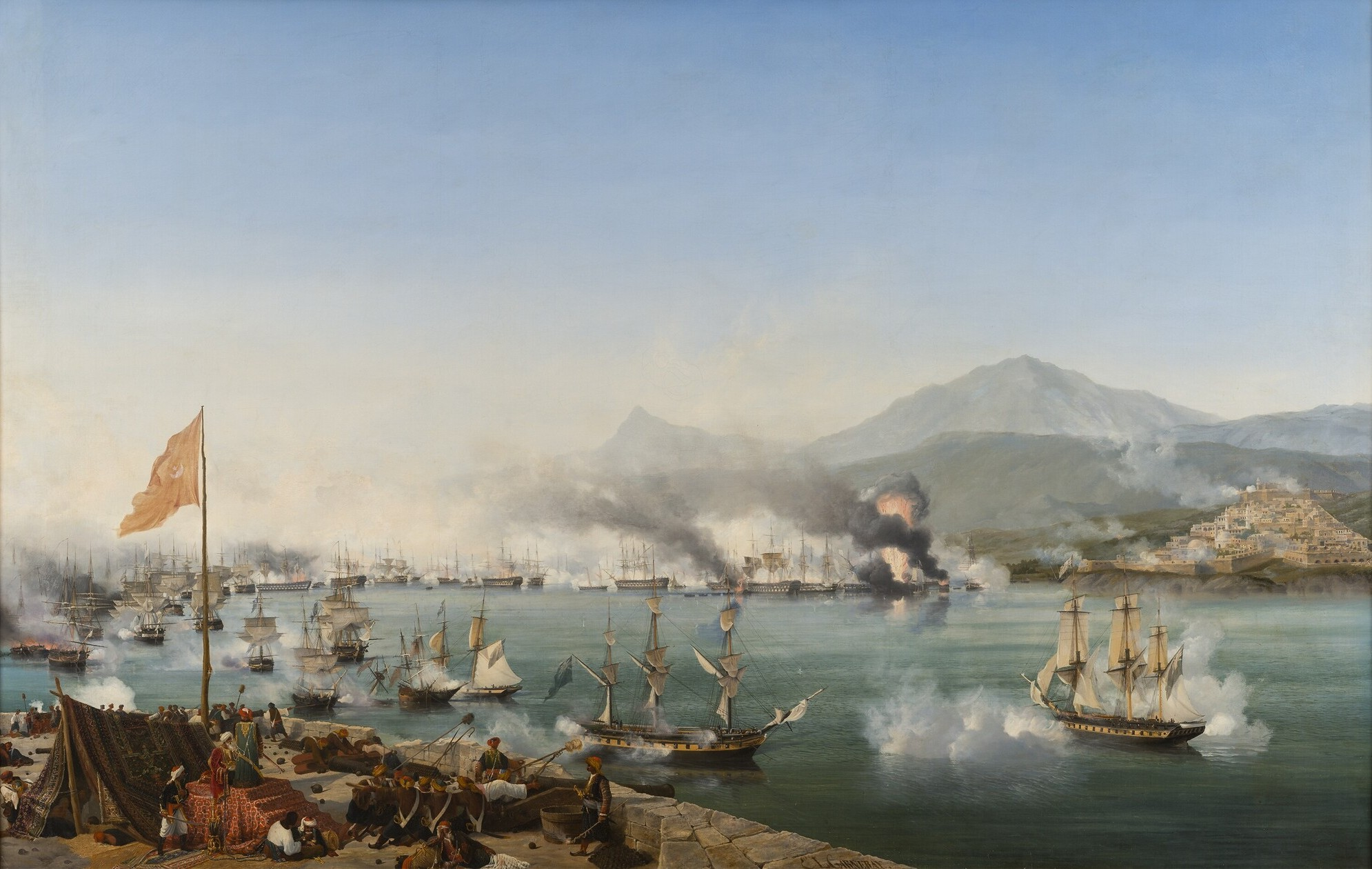
October 20: Naval Battle of Navarino by Ambroise Louis Garneray

At the start of the decade, most of Greece was under the rule of the Ottoman Empire, as it had been since 1453, despite frequent revolts. In early 1821, a secret organization called the Filiki Eteria instigated several battles that, together with the blessing of a Greek flag and proclamation of uprising by Bishop Germanos of Patras on March 25, marked the beginning of the revolution. The uprising successfully established a foothold in the Peloponnese, seizing Tripolitsa in September 1821, and had some success in Crete, Macedonia and Central Greece.

Between 1821 and 1824, first and second national assemblies were held, and the constitutions of 1822 and of 1823 were established. However, revolutionary activity was fragmented, resulting in the civil wars of 1824–1825. The Greek side withstood the Turkish attacks because, during this period, the Ottoman military campaigns were periodic and uncoordinated.

That changed when the Ottoman Sultan Mahmud II negotiated with Mehmet Ali of Egypt, who agreed to send his son Ibrahim Pasha to Greece with an army to suppress the revolt in return for territorial gain. Ibrahim landed in the Peloponnese in February 1825 and secured most of the peninsula by the end of 1825. He then helped break the siege of Missolonghi. Although Ibrahim was defeated in Mani, he had succeeded in suppressing most of the revolt in the Peloponnese and Athens had been retaken.

Following years of negotiation, three Great Powers, Russia, the United Kingdom and France had come to agree to the formation of an autonomous Greek state under Ottoman suzerainty, as stipulated in the Treaty of London. Ottoman refusal to accept these terms led to the Battle of Navarino, which effectively secured complete Greek independence. That year, the Third National Assembly at Troezen established the First Hellenic Republic. With the help of a French expeditionary force, the Greeks drove the Turks out of the Peloponnese and proceeded to the captured part of Central Greece by 1828. As a result of years of negotiation, Greece was finally recognized as an independent nation in May 1832.

==== Western Europe ====
===== United Kingdom =====
In the 1820s, the British government was led by the prime ministers Lord Liverpool (1812–1827), George Canning (1827), Lord Goderich (1827–1828), and Duke of Wellington (1828–1830). The British supported the Portuguese liberals in the Liberal Wars, and supported Greek rebels in the war for independence. London became the world'slargest city of the world, overtaking Beijing.

Domestic tensions ran high at the start of the decade, with the Peterloo Massacre (1819), the Cato Street Conspiracy (1820), and the Radical War (1820) in Scotland. However, by the end of the 1820s, many repressive laws were repealed. In 1822, Britain repealed the death penalty for over 100 crimes, and punishments such as drawing and quartering and flagellation fell out of use. Seditious Meetings prevention Act (barring large assemblies) and the Combination Act (banning trade unions) were repealed in 1824. The Roman Catholic Relief Act by Parliament of the United Kingdom granted a substantial measure of Catholic emancipation in Britain and Ireland.

===== France =====
- May 5, 1821 – Emperor Napoleon I dies in exile on Saint Helena of stomach cancer.
- September 16, 1824 – Charles X succeeds his brother Louis XVIII as King of France.
- January 4, 1828 – France: The Vicomte de Martignac succeeds the Comte de Villèle as Prime Minister of France.
- August 8, 1829 – France: The Prince de Polignac succeeds the Vicomte de Martignac as Prime Minister of France.

=== Africa ===
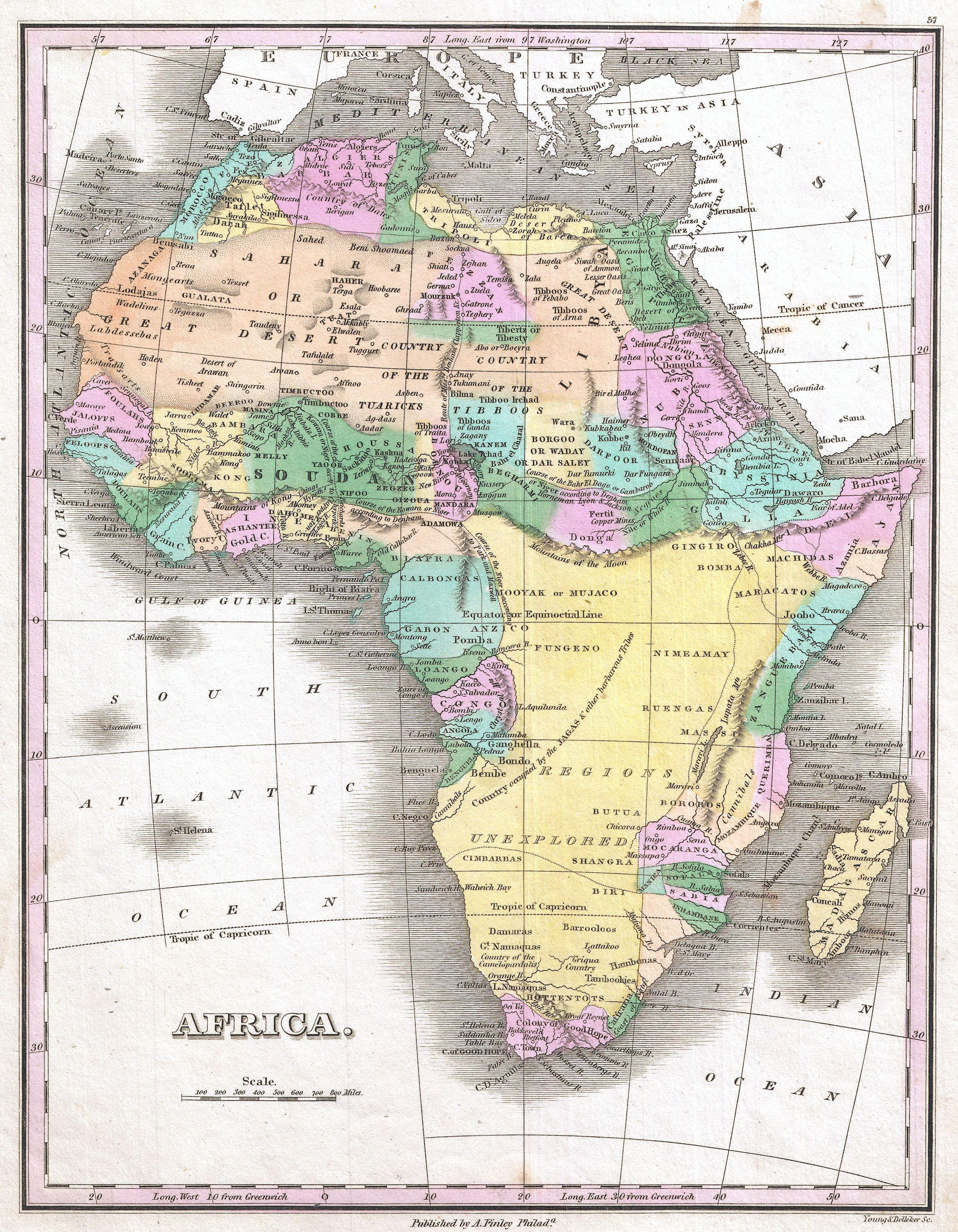
Anthony Finley's 1827 map of Africa

- February 6, 1820: 86 free African American colonists sail from New York City to Freetown, Sierra Leone.
- Americo-Liberians begin to settle in the Colony of Liberia with the support of the American Colonization Society
- June 14, 1821 – King Badi VII of Sennar surrenders his throne and realm to Ismail Pasha, general of the Ottoman Empire, ending the existence of that Sudanese kingdom.
- 1822 – The first group of freed slaves from the United States arrive in modern-day Liberia and found Monrovia (see History of Liberia).
- January 22, 1824 – The Ashanti crush British forces in the Gold Coast, killing the British governor Sir Charles MacCarthy (see also Wars between Britain and Ashanti in Ghana and Ashanti Confederacy).
- August 18, 1826 – Explorer Alexander Gordon Laing becomes the first European to reach Timbuktu.
- April 1827 – Ottoman Algeria: Husain Dei slaps the French consul Decalina on the face, eventually leading to war and French rule in Algeria.

=== North America ===
==== British North America ====
- July 8, 1822 – The Chippewas turn over huge tract of land in Ontario to the United Kingdom.
- November 30, 1824 – The first sod is turned in Ontario, for the first of four Welland Canals (the canal opens for a trial run exactly 5 years later to the day).

==== United States ====
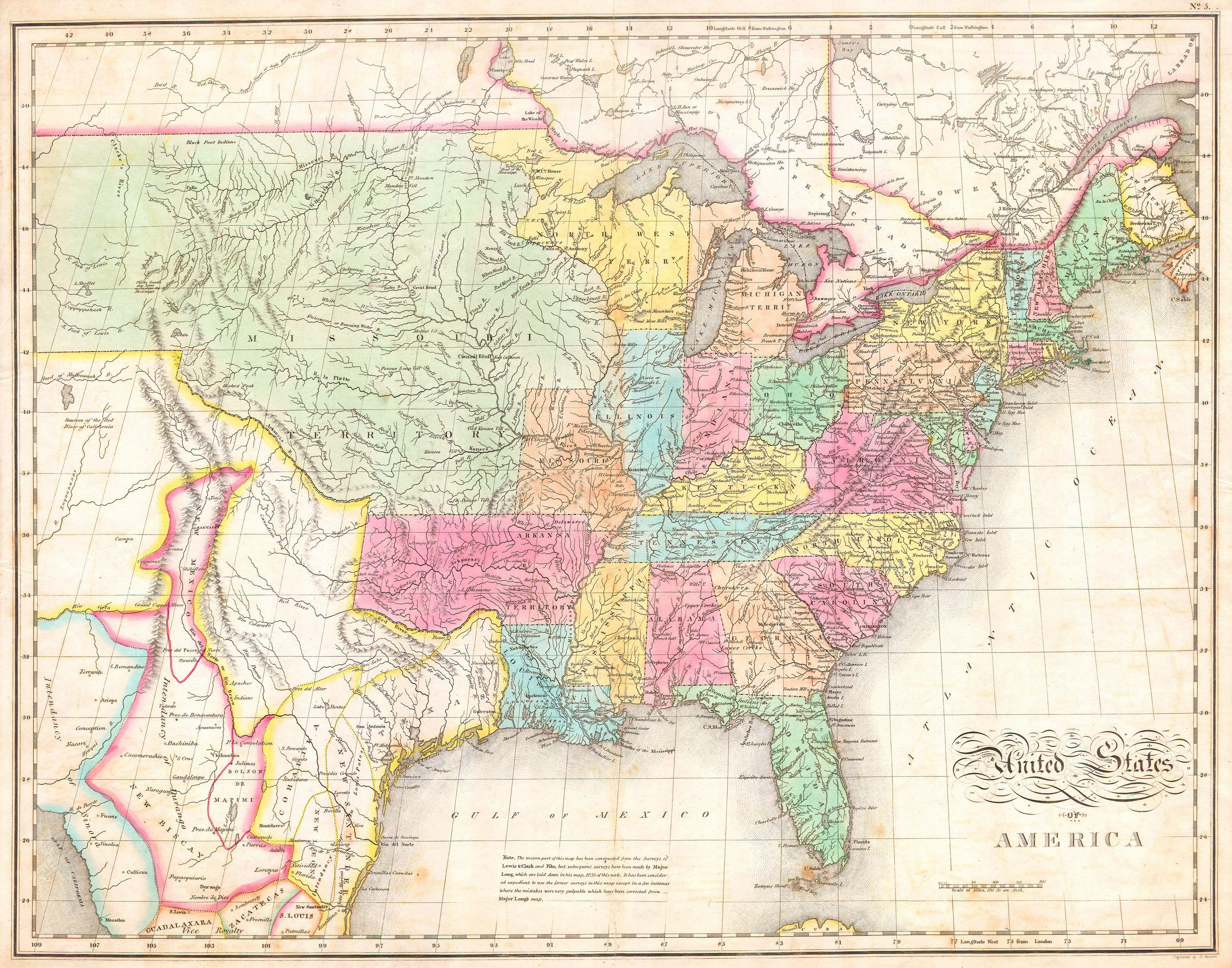
John Melish map of the United States circa 1822

At the beginning of the 1820s, the United States stretched from the Atlantic Ocean through to (roughly) the western edge of the Mississippi basin, though Florida, Michigan, Wisconsin and all present-day states fully west of the Mississippi had yet to be granted statehood. Two states were admitted to the union during this decade: Maine in 1820 and Missouri in 1821. The Adams–Onís Treaty, signed in 1819 and ratified by Spain in 1821, ceded Florida (already conquered by USA in 1818) to the United States, and established a boundary between New Spain and the United States.

Slavery was widespread throughout the southern United States. According to the 1820 U.S. Census, the slave population at that time was 1,538,000. The Missouri Compromise of 1820 prohibited slavery in the former Louisiana Territory north of the parallel 36°30′ north except within the boundaries of the proposed state of Missouri. By the 1830 U.S. Census, the slave population had risen to 2,009,043. With the coordination of the American Colonization Society, many freed African-Americans repatriated to Africa during this decade to the newly formed colony of Liberia.

The political mood at the start of the 1820s was referred to as the Era of Good Feelings, following the collapse of the Federalist party. James Monroe, the sitting U.S. president since 1817, was re-elected in 1820, virtually unopposed. In 1823, Monroe introduced the Monroe Doctrine in the State of the Union Address, declaring that any European attempts to recolonize the Americas would be considered a hostile act towards the United States.

The feeling of unity during the Monroe administration was dispelled in the presidential election of 1824, which due to an Electoral College stalemate, was decided in the United States House of Representatives. John Quincy Adams was chosen as the sixth U.S. president, despite receiving only 30.9% of the popular vote to Andrew Jackson's 41.3%. This gave rise to Jacksonian Nationalism and the rise of the modern Democratic Party, with Andrew Jackson elected in the 1828 election.

==== Mexico ====
After ten years of civil war in Mexico (then called the "Viceroyalty of New Spain") and the death of two of its founders, by early 1820 the Mexican independence movement was stalemated and close to collapse. However, the Army of the Three Guarantees was formed under the command of Colonel Agustín de Iturbide with the support of patriots and loyalists to secure independence for Mexico and the protection of Roman Catholicism. Iturbide's army was joined by rebel forces from all over Mexico, and quickly gained control of Mexico. On August 24, 1821, representatives of the Spanish crown and Iturbide signed the Treaty of Córdoba, which recognized the Mexican Empire under the terms of the Plan of Iguala.

On September 27 the Army of the Three Guarantees entered Mexico City, and the following day Iturbide proclaimed the independence of the Mexican Empire. The newly formed Mexican congress eventually declared Iturbide emperor of Mexico on May 19, 1822. Later that year, Iturbide dissolved Congress and replaced it with a sympathetic junta. However, on March 19, 1823 Iturbide abdicated.

The First Federal Republic was established on October 4, 1824. In the new constitution, the republic took the name of United Mexican States, and was defined as a representative federal republic, with Catholicism as the official and unique religion. Guadalupe Victoria was the first President of Mexico from 1824 until 1829.

After Manuel Gómez Pedraza won the election to succeed Victoria, Vicente Guerrero staged a coup d'état and took the presidency on April 1, 1829. Guerrero was deposed in a rebellion under Vice-president Anastasio Bustamante in December 1829.

=== Caribbean ===
- December 1, 1821 – The Dominican Republic declares independence from Spain only to be invaded by Haiti in 1822 (see History of the Dominican Republic).
- February 9, 1822 – The invading Haitian forces led by Jean-Pierre Boyer arrive in Santo Domingo, to overthrow the newly founded Republic.
- April 17, 1825 – Charles X of France recognizes Haiti, 21 years after it expelled the French following the successful Haitian Revolution, and demands the payment of 150 million gold francs, 30 million of which Haiti must finance through France itself, as down payment.

=== Central America ===
- February 20, 1820 – A revolt begins in Santa María Chiquimula, Totonicapán department of Guatemala.
- The United Provinces of Central America were formed in 1823.
- September 15, 1821 – Guatemala, El Salvador, Honduras, Nicaragua and Costa Rica gain independence from Spain (see History of Central America).
- November 28, 1821 – Panama declares independence from Spain (see History of Panama).
- July 1– The congress of Central America declares absolute independence from Spain, Mexico, and any other foreign nation, including North America and a Republican system of government is established.
- June 22, 1826 – The Pan-American Congress of Panama tries (unsuccessfully) to unify the American republics.

=== South America ===
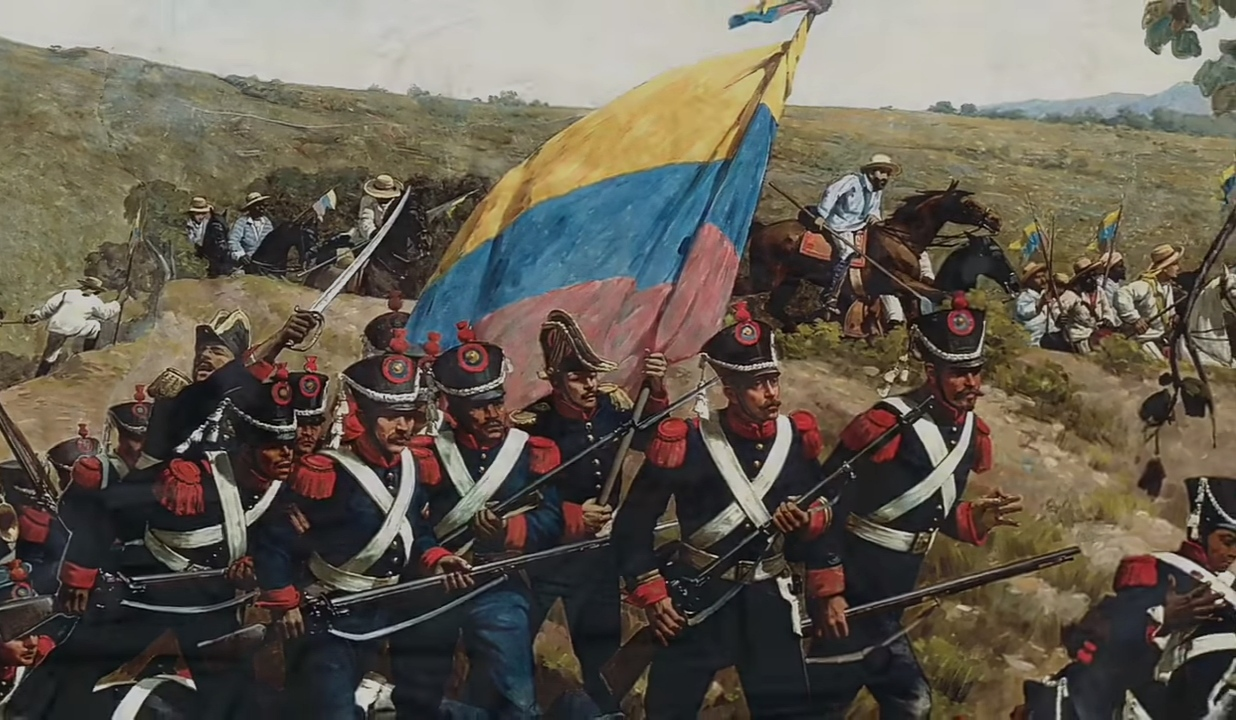
La Batalla de Carabobo by Martín Tovar y Tovar, depicting the Battle of Carabobo, in which Simón Bolívar secured Venezuela's independence from Spain in 1821

==== Gran Colombia ====
- October 9, 1820 – Guayaquil declares independence from Spain (see also History of Ecuador).
- June 24, 1821 – Battle of Carabobo: Simón Bolívar wins Venezuela's independence from Spain (see Venezuela's independence).
- September 7, 1821 – The Republic of Gran Colombia (a federation covering much of present-day Venezuela, Colombia, Panama, and Ecuador) is established, with Simón Bolívar as the founding President and Francisco de Paula Santander as vice president.
- May 24, 1822 – Battle of Pichincha: Simón Bolívar secures the independence of Quito.
- July 26, 1822 – José de San Martín arrives in Guayaquil, Ecuador, to meet with Simón Bolívar.
- July 27, 1822 – Simón Bolívar and General José de San Martín meet in Guayaquil. Bolívar later annexes Guayaquil (See Guayaquil Conference).
- June 3, 1828 – Gran Colombia – Peru War: President Simón Bolívar declares war on Peru.
- August 27, 1828 – Simón Bolívar declares himself dictator of Gran Colombia.

==== Bolivia ====
- August 6, 1825 – Bolivia gains its independence from Spain as a republic with the instigation of Simón Bolívar.

==== Peru ====
- July 28, 1821 – Peru declares independence from Spain (see Peru's Independence from Spain).
- September 10, 1823 – Simón Bolívar is named President of Peru.
- February 10, 1824 – Simón Bolívar is proclaimed dictator of Peru.
- December 9, 1824 – Battle of Ayacucho: Peruvian forces defeat the Spanish.
- February 10, 1825 – Simón Bolívar gives up his title of dictator of Peru and takes the alternative title of Liberator.

==== Brazil ====
- 1822: Brazil gains independence
- September 7, 1822 – Brazil declares its independence from Portugal (see Brazilian independence).
- October 12, 1822 – Peter I of Brazil is declared the constitutional emperor of the Brazilian Empire.
- December 1, 1822 – Peter I is crowned as Emperor of Brazil (see The reign of Pedro I, 1822–31).
- April 26, 1828 – Treaty of Commerce and Navigation signed between Brazil and Denmark, establishing diplomatic relations between the two countries.

==== Argentina–Brazil War ====
- March 7, 1827 – Brazilian marines sail up the Rio Negro and attack the temporary naval base of Carmen de Patagones, Argentina; they are defeated by the local citizens.
- April 7–April 8, 1827 – Battle of Monte Santiago: A squadron of the Brazilian Imperial Navy defeats Argentine vessels in a major naval engagement.
- February 20, 1827 – Battle of Ituzaingo (Passo do Rosário): A force of the Brazilian Imperial Army meets Argentine–Uruguayan troops in combat.
- August 27, 1828 – South America: Brazil and Argentina recognize the independence of Uruguay.

==== Uruguay ====
- July 18, 1825 – Uruguay declares independence from Brazil (see Uruguay's independence).
- August 27, 1828 – South America: Brazil and Argentina recognize the independence of Uruguay.

==== Argentina ====
- 1820: The Argentine Confederation (Argentina) establishes a penal colony in the Malvinas.
- February 8, 1826 – Unitarian Bernardino Rivadavia becomes the first President of Argentina.

==== Chile ====
- February 6, 1820 – Lord Cochrane occupies Valdivia in the name of the Republic of Chile.
- September 4, 1821 – Chilean general José Miguel Carrera is executed by an Argentinian military tribunal in the city of Mendoza.

=== Pacific Islands ===
- August 21, 1821 – Jarvis Island is discovered by the crew of the Eliza Frances.
- July 14, 1827 – Kingdom of Hawaii: The Diocese of Honolulu is founded.

== Economics and commerce ==
- 1821: High-quality cotton is introduced in Egypt.
- 1822 – Ashley's Hundred leave from St. Louis, setting off a major increase in fur trade.
- 1822 – Coffee is no longer banned in Sweden.
- 1824 – The construction of Fort Vancouver trading post started on the North shore of the lower Columbia River by the Hudson's Bay Company. Inauguration occurred the following year when Fort George was closed.
- August 18, 1825 – Gregor MacGregor issues a £300,000 loan with 2.5% interest through the London bank of Thomas Jenkins & Company. His actions lead to the Panic of 1825, the first modern stock market crash in London.

=== Slavery, serfdom and labor ===
- March 3, 1820 and March 6, 1820 – Slavery in the United States: The Missouri Compromise becomes law.
- 1820: Robert Owen devises the labour voucher.
- 1820: 18,957 black slaves leave Luanda, Angola.
- 1828 – 32,000 Angolans are sold in Rio de Janeiro, Brazil.
- June 5, 1829 – Slave trade: HMS Pickle captures the armed slave ship Voladora off the coast of Cuba.

== Science and technology ==
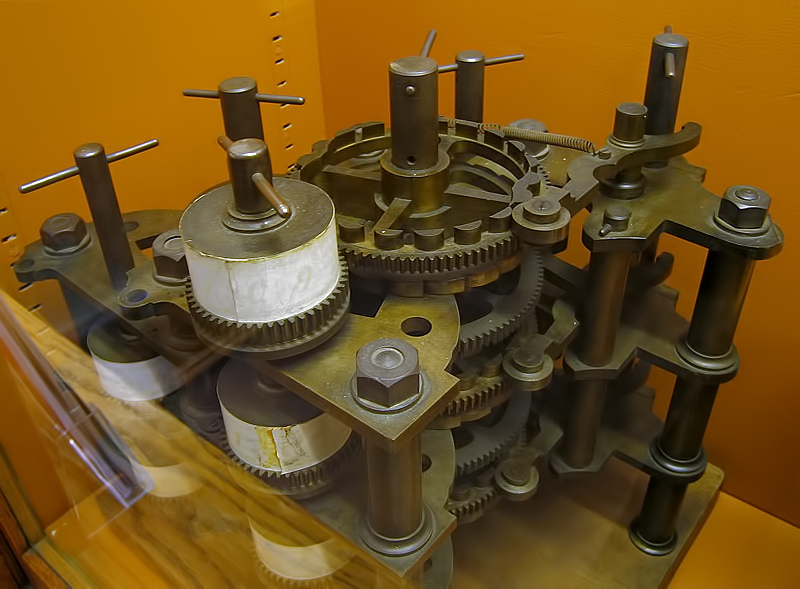
1822: Babbage's Difference engine.

- January 28, 1820 – A Russian expedition led by Fabian Gottlieb von Bellingshausen and Mikhail Petrovich Lazarev approaches the Antarctic coast (see History of Antarctica).
- January 30, 1820 – Edward Bransfield lands on the Antarctic mainland (see History of Antarctica).
- April 1820 – Hans Christian Ørsted discovers the relationship between electricity and magnetism.
- May 11, 1820 – HMS Beagle (the ship that later takes young Charles Darwin on his scientific voyage) is launched.
- 1820: The 6th edition of the Encyclopædia Britannica appears.
- June 14, 1822 – Charles Babbage proposes a Difference engine.
- 1822 – Hieroglyphs are deciphered by Thomas Young and Jean-François Champollion, using the Rosetta Stone.
- 1822 – Galileo Galilei's Dialogue is taken off the Index Librorum Prohibitorum, the Roman Catholic Church's list of banned books.
- 1822 – The Graham Cracker is developed in Bound Brook, New Jersey by the Presbyterian minister Sylvester Graham.

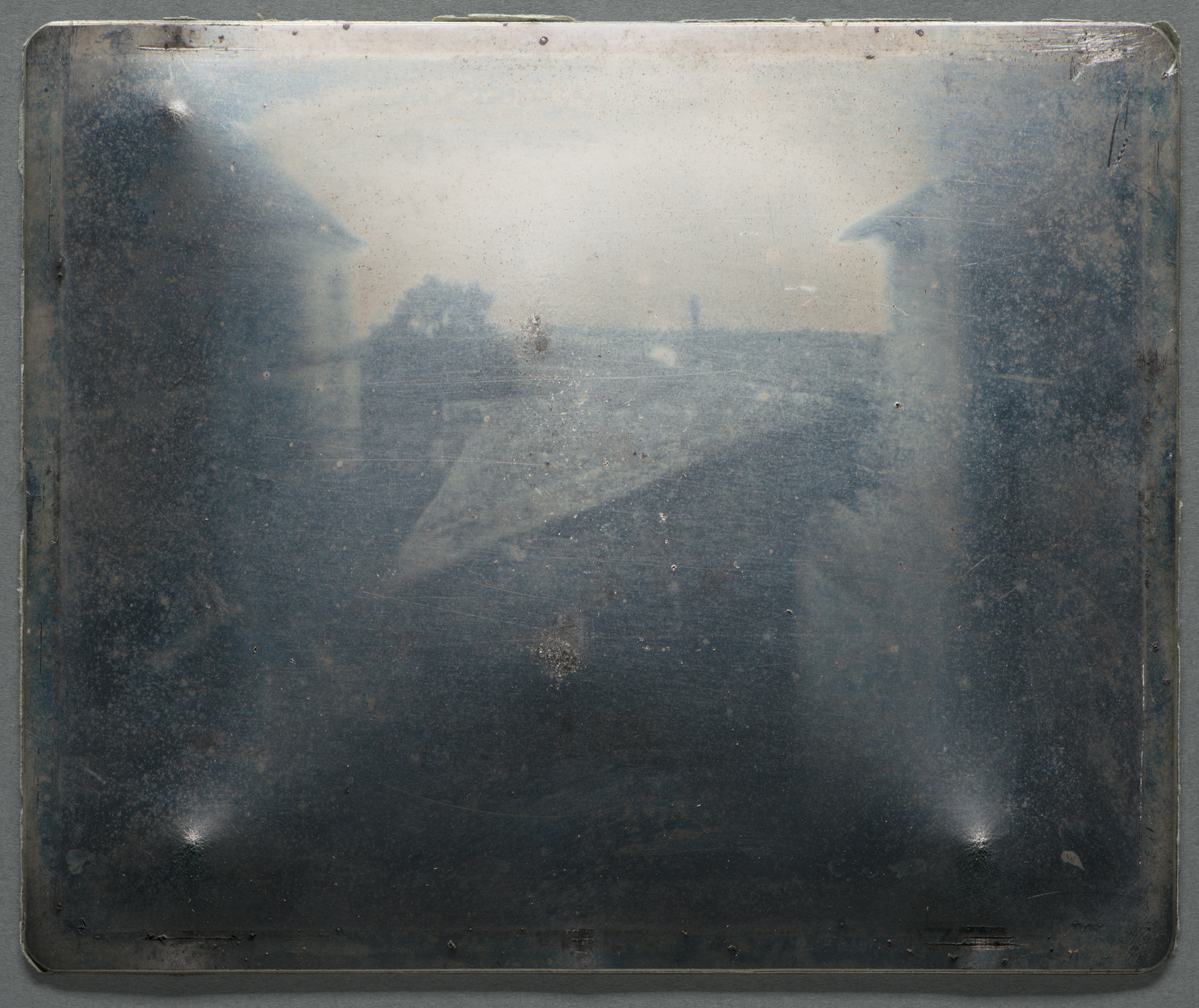
The oldest surviving photograph, Nicéphore Niépce, circa 1826

- 1823 – Olbers' paradox is described by the German astronomer Heinrich Wilhelm Olbers.
- January 8, 1824 – After much controversy, Michael Faraday is finally elected as a member of the Royal Society with only one vote against him.
- October 21, 1824 – Joseph Aspdin patents Portland Cement.
- 1824 – The Panoramagram is developed, creating the first volumetric display.
- 1824- Gideon Mantell and Mary Anning discover an Iguanodon tooth and Megalosaurus skeletons not far from their home in England giving birth to Paleontology.
- 1825 – Hans Christian Ørsted reduces aluminium chloride to make aluminium.
- June 1826 – Photography: Nicéphore Niépce makes a true photograph.
- 1826 – Aniline is first isolated from the destructive distillation of indigo by Otto Unverdorben.
- May 25, 1827 – Romanian inventor Petrache Poenaru receives a French patent for the invention of the first fountain pen with a replaceable ink cartridge.
- 1827 – Englishman John Walker invents the first friction match which he names Lucifer.
- 1828 – Friedrich Wöhler synthesizes urea, implicitly discrediting a cornerstone of vitalism.
- 1828 – Ányos Jedlik creates the world's first electric motor.
- 1828 – Casparus van Houten Sr. (father of Coenraad Johannes van Houten) patents an inexpensive method for pressing cocoa butter from roasted cocoa beans, leaving defatted cocoa. This is an important step in modern solid chocolate production.
- May 6, 1829 – The patent for an instrument called the accordion is applied for by Cyrill Demian (Officially approved on May 23.)
- July 23, 1829 – In the United States, William Burt obtains the first patent for a form of typewriter.

== Transportation ==
- 1825 – The first horse-drawn omnibuses established in London.
- September 27, 1825 – The world's first modern railway, the Stockton and Darlington Railway, opens in England.
- October 26, 1825 – The Erie Canal opens, providing passage from Albany, New York to Buffalo and Lake Erie.
- 1825: The Ohio and Erie Canal is dug to extend settlement access and commercial traffic to the Ohio River.
- January 30, 1826 – The Menai Suspension Bridge, built by engineer Thomas Telford, is opened between the island of Anglesey and the mainland of Wales.
- April 1, 1826 – Samuel Morey patents the internal combustion engine.
- October 1, 1826 – Opening of the Monkland and Kirkintilloch Railway in Scotland.
- September 21, 1826 – Construction of the Rideau Canal begins in Canada.
- October 7, 1826 – The first train operates over the Granite Railway in Massachusetts.
- 1826 – The first railway tunnel is built en route between Liverpool and Manchester in England.
- February 28, 1827 – The Baltimore and Ohio Railroad is incorporated, becoming the first railroad in United States offering commercial transportation of both people and freight.
- April 26–May 24, 1827 - The Royal Netherlands Navy's British-built paddle steamer Curaçao makes the first Transatlantic Crossing by steam, from Hellevoetsluis to Paramaribo.
- July 4, 1829 – George Shillibeer begins operating the first bus service in London.
- October 8, 1829 – Rail transport: Stephenson's Rocket wins the Rainhill Trials.
- November 30, 1829 – The original Welland Canal opens for a trial run with a ceremony at Port Dalhousie.

== Culture ==
=== Literature ===
- 1824–1825: American Writers by John Neal, the earliest history of American literature, is published in Blackwood's Magazine

=== Music ===
- February 3, 1823 – Gioachino Rossini's Semiramide is first performed.
- April 13, 1823 – Eleven-year-old Franz Liszt gives a concert after which he is personally congratulated by Ludwig van Beethoven.
- May 7, 1824 – One of Beethoven's most notable pieces, his Symphony No. 9, premieres in Vienna.
- Early July, 1826 – Ludwig van Beethoven puts the finishing touches on the String Quartet in C sharp Minor, Opus 131.
- 1826 – Ludwig van Beethoven composes the Große Fuge.
- March 11, 1829 – Felix Mendelssohn performs Bach's St Matthew Passion.
- April–September – Felix Mendelssohn pays his first visit to Britain. This includes the first London performance of his concert overture to A Midsummer Night's Dream and his trip to Fingal's Cave.

=== Art ===
- 1820: Venus de Milo is found on the island of Melos (Milos).

=== Poetry ===
- 1820: John Keats completes Ode on Melancholy, one in a series of his famous Odes.
- 1820: John Clare 13 July 1793 - 20 May 1864 publishes Poems Descriptive of Rural life 1820
- 1826: Felicia Hemans publishes Casabianca, a poem commemorating the sinking of a French ship called the Orient during The Battle of the Nile in 1798.

=== Sports ===
- 1823 – William Webb Ellis "invents" Rugby football.
- August 10, 1826 – The first Cowes Regatta is held on the Isle of Wight in the UK.
- June 10, 1829 – The Oxford University Boat Club wins the very first boat race.
- August 10, 1829 – First ascent of Finsteraarhorn, the highest summit of the Bernese Alps.

=== Theatre ===
- January 19, 1829 – August Klingemann's adaptation of Johann Wolfgang von Goethe's Faust premieres in Braunschweig.

=== Fashion ===
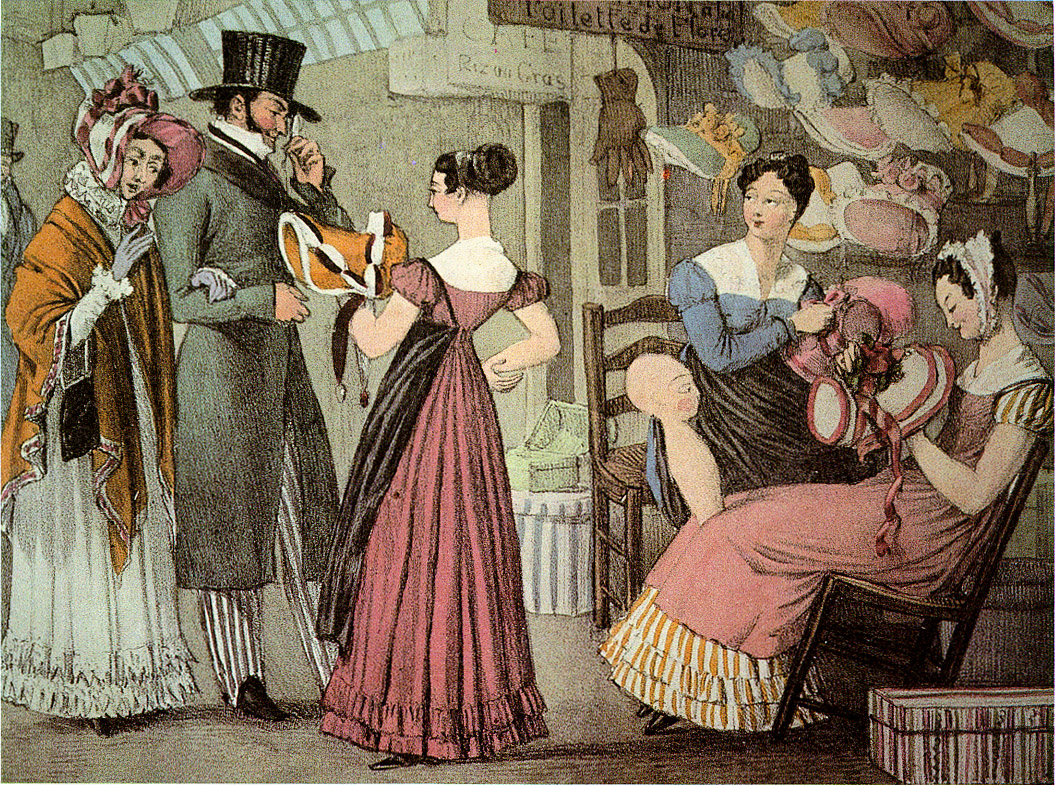
A millinery shop in Paris, 1822

During the 1820s in European and European-influenced countries, fashionable women's clothing styles transitioned away from the classically influenced "Empire"/"Regency" styles of ca. 1795–1820 (with their relatively unconfining empire silhouette) and re-adopted elements that had been characteristic of most of the 18th century (and were to be characteristic of the remainder of the 19th century), such as full skirts and clearly visible corseting of the natural waist.

The silhouette of men's fashion changed in similar ways: by the mid-1820s coats featured broad shoulders with puffed sleeves, a narrow waist, and full skirts. Trousers were worn for smart day wear, while breeches continued in use at court and in the country.

=== Miscellaneous ===
- May 26, 1828 – Feral child: Kaspar Hauser is discovered in Nuremberg, Germany.
- 1822 Jean-François Champollion cracks the hieroglyphic code by using the Rosetta Stone.

== Establishments ==
- July 20, 1820 – Saint Cronan's Boys National School opens in Bray, County Wicklow, Ireland under the title Bray Male School. It is the oldest school in Bray and its notable past pupils include the former president of Ireland, Cearbhall Ó Dálaigh.
- 1820: Indiana University is founded as the Indiana State Seminary and renamed the Indiana College in 1846, to later be renamed Indiana University.
- February 9, 1821 – The George Washington University is chartered as The Columbian College of the District of Columbia by President Monroe.
- June 27, 1821 – The New Hampton School is founded in the United States state of New Hampshire.
- September 18, 1821 – Amherst College is founded in Massachusetts.
- 1822 – Aban Palace is completed.
- August 12, 1822 – St David's College (now the University of Wales, Lampeter) is founded by Bishop Thomas Burgess.
- November 13, 1822 – founding of the Congregation of St. Basil
- June 5, 1823 – Raffles Institution, then the Singapore Institution, was founded by the founder of Singapore, Sir Stamford Raffles.
- 1823 – Jackson Male Academy, precursor of Union University, is founded in Tennessee.
- 1823 – The Oxford Union is founded.
- January 24, 1824 – The Westminster Review, No1. is published.
- June 16, 1824 – Society for the Prevention of Cruelty to Animals is established in Great Britain.
- October 10, 1824 – The Edinburgh Town Council makes a decision to found the Edinburgh Municipal Fire Brigade, the first fire brigade in Britain.
- November 5, 1824 – Rensselaer Polytechnic Institute (the first technological university in the English-speaking world) is founded in Troy, New York.
- December 24, 1824 – The First American Fraternity, Chi Phi (ΧΦ), is founded at Princeton University.
- 1824 – The Cimetière du Montparnasse is established in Paris, France.
- September 1825 – The Lady Margaret Boat Club is founded by 12 members of St John's College, Cambridge.
- 1825 – The City of Brisbane is founded (see History of Brisbane).
- 1825 – The United States Postal Service started a dead letter office.
- February 11, 1826 – University College London is founded, under the name University of London.
- February 13, 1826 – The American Temperance Society is founded.
- March 16, 1827 – Freedom's Journal, the first African-American owned and published newspaper in the United States, is founded in New York City by John Russwurm.
- 1827 – Egypt: Cairo University School of Medicine is established as the first African medical school in the Middle East.
- 1827 – J. J. Audubon begins publishing Birds of America.
- April 11, 1828 – Bahía Blanca is founded.
- June 1, 1829 – The Philadelphia Inquirer is founded as The Pennsylvania Inquirer.
- October 1, 1829 – South African College inaugurated in Cape Town.
- 1829 – King's College London is founded under the patronage of King George IV and the prime minister The Duke of Wellington. It will become the third official university in England.
- 1829 – The Chalmers University of Technology is founded in Gothenburg.

== Disasters, natural events, and notable mishaps ==
- November 20, 1820 After the sinking of the Essex (1799 whaleship) of Nantucket by a whale the survivors were left floating in three small whaleboats. They eventually resorted, by common consent, to cannibalism to allow some to survive.
- 1820: Mount Rainier erupts over what is today Seattle.
- February 6, 1822 – Chinese junk Tek Sing sinks in the South China Sea with the loss of around 1600 people on board.
- May 26, 1822 – 116 people die in the Grue Church fire, the biggest fire disaster in Norway's history.
- 1822 – An earthquake in Chile raises the coastal area.
- July 15, 1823 – The Basilica of Saint Paul Outside the Walls in Rome is almost completely destroyed by fire.
- November 7, 1824 – In the worst flood to date in Saint Petersburg, water rises 421 cm above normal and 200 lose their lives.
- October 7, 1825 – The Miramichi Fire breaks out in New Brunswick.
- August, 1826 – The town of Crawford Notch suffers a landslide, killing nine people. Those killed include seven members of the Willey family, after whom Mount Willey is named.
- 1828 – A typhoon kills approximately 10,000 people in Kyūshū, Japan.

== Religion ==
- 1820: Joseph Smith receives his First Vision in the spring in Palmyra, New York.
- September 22, 1823 – Joseph Smith says that he was directed by God through the angel Moroni to the place where the Golden plates are stored.
- February 11, 1826 – Swaminarayan writes the Shikshapatri, an important text within the Swaminarayan faith.
- July 26, 1826 – The last auto-da-fé is held in Valencia, Spain.
- March 31, 1829 – Pope Pius VIII succeeds Pope Leo XII as the 253rd pope.
- June 19, 1829 – Robert Peel's Metropolitan Police Act establishes the Metropolitan Police Service in London, the first modern police force. The first officers, known by the nicknames "bobbies" or "peelers", go on patrol on September 29.

== People ==
=== Authors ===
- Nathaniel Hawthorne
- Mary Shelley
- Alexandre Dumas
- Washington Irving
- Walter Scott.
- John Neal
- Lord Byron
- Percy Shelly

=== Composers ===
- Ludwig van Beethoven
- Nicolo Paganini
- Carl Maria von Weber
- Gioachino Rossini
- Franz Schubert
- Felix Mendelssohn
- Frederic Chopin
- Franz Liszt

== Births ==
1820

=== January–June ===
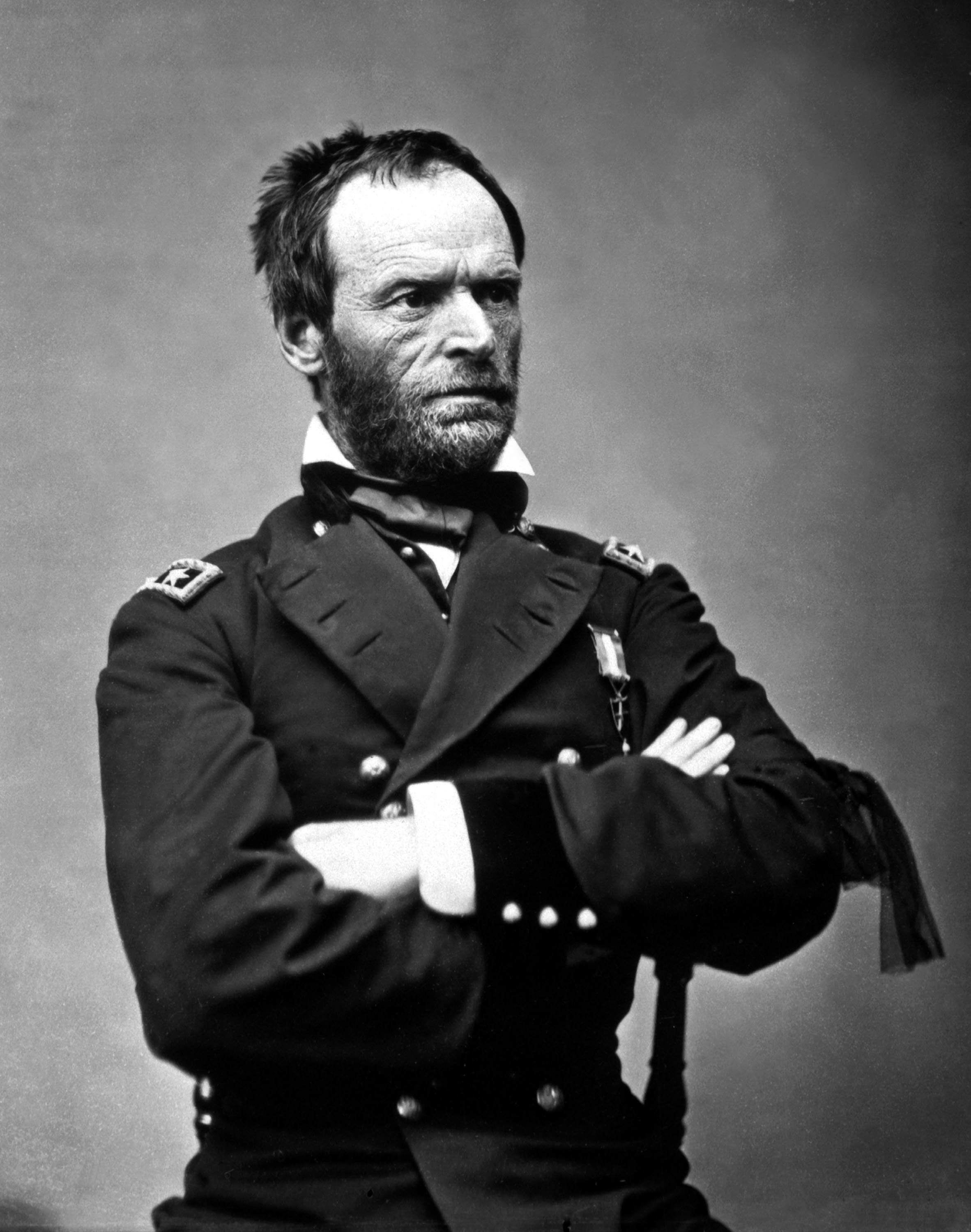
William Sherman

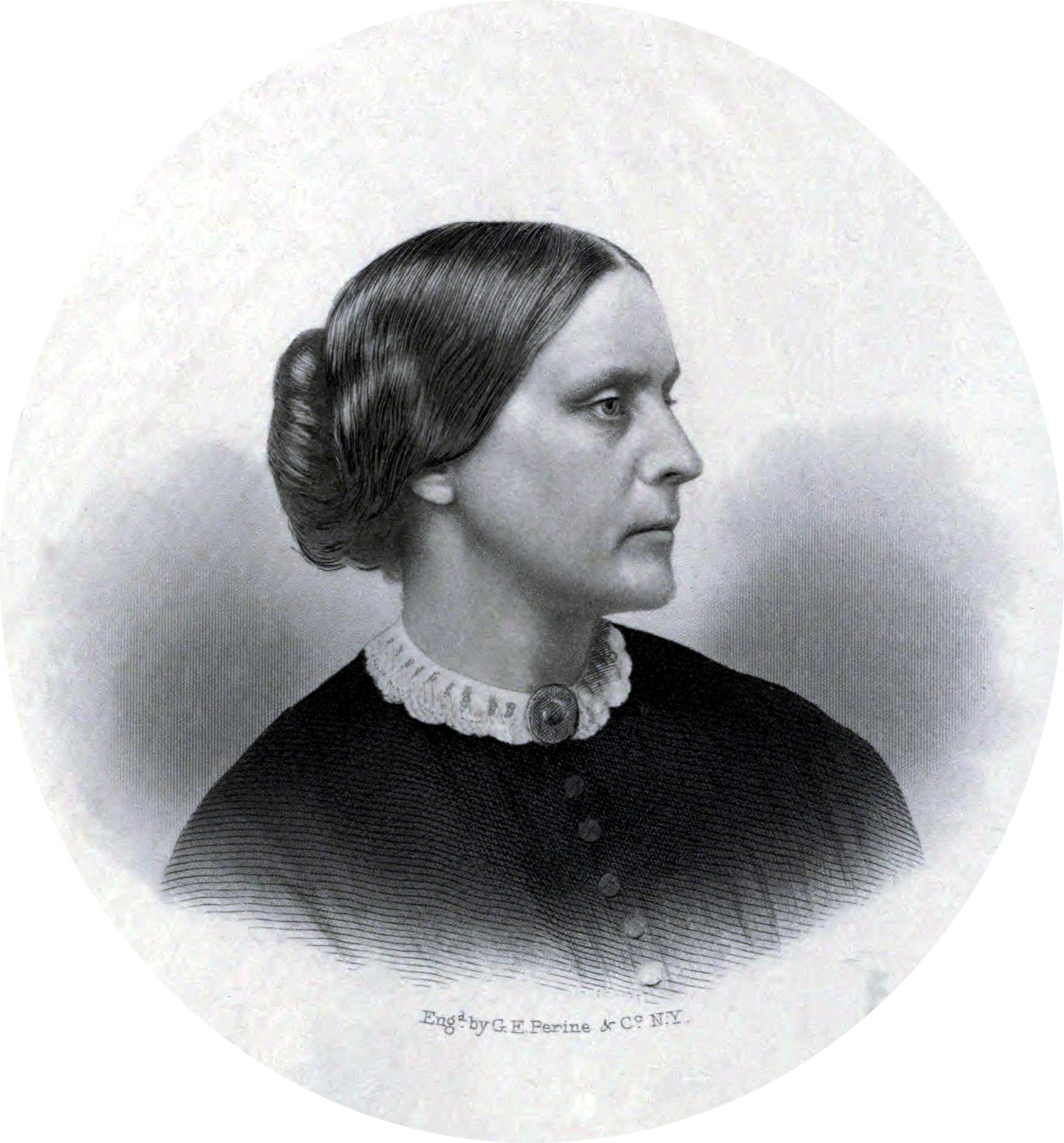
Susan B. Anthony

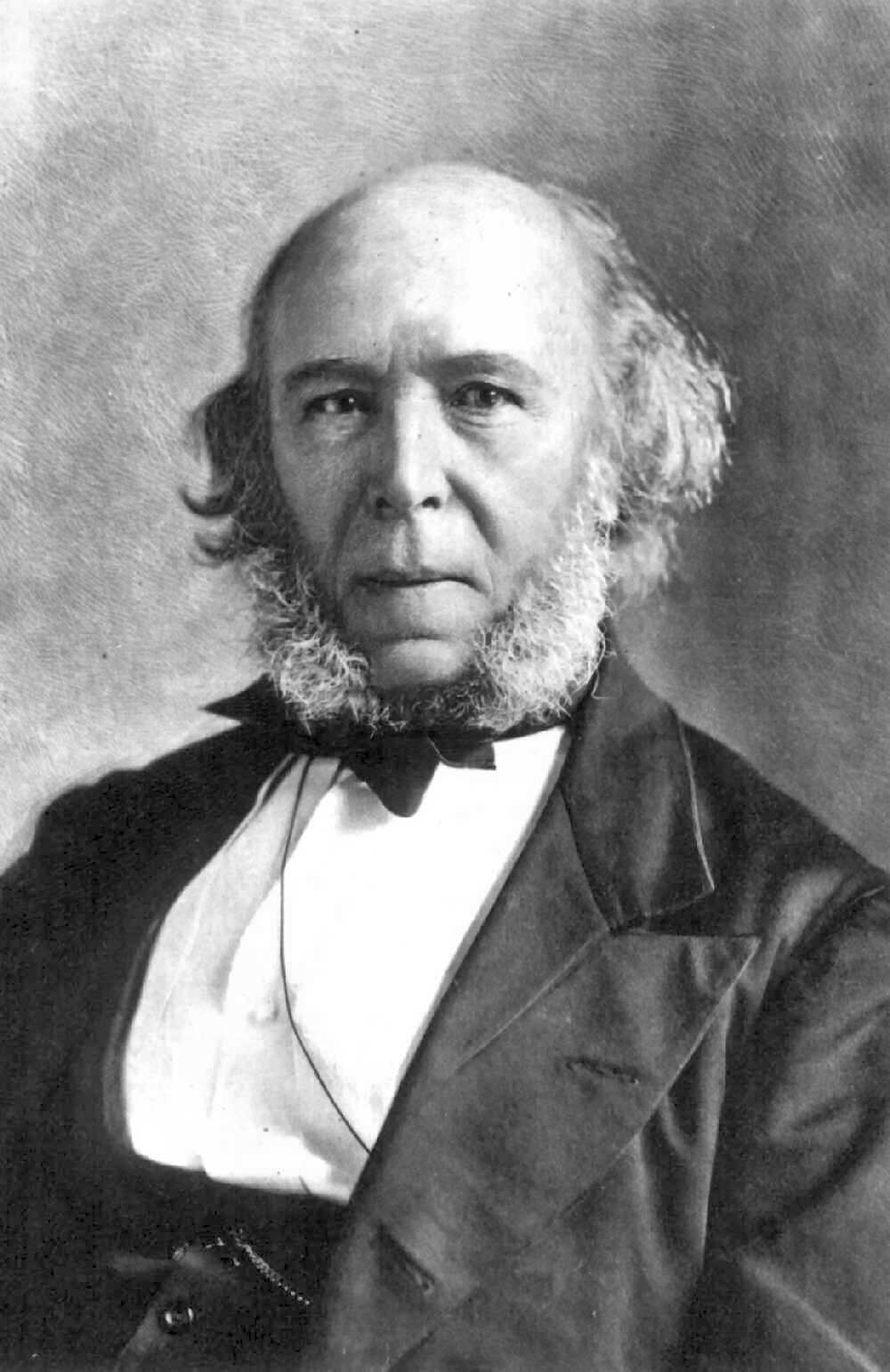
Herbert Spencer

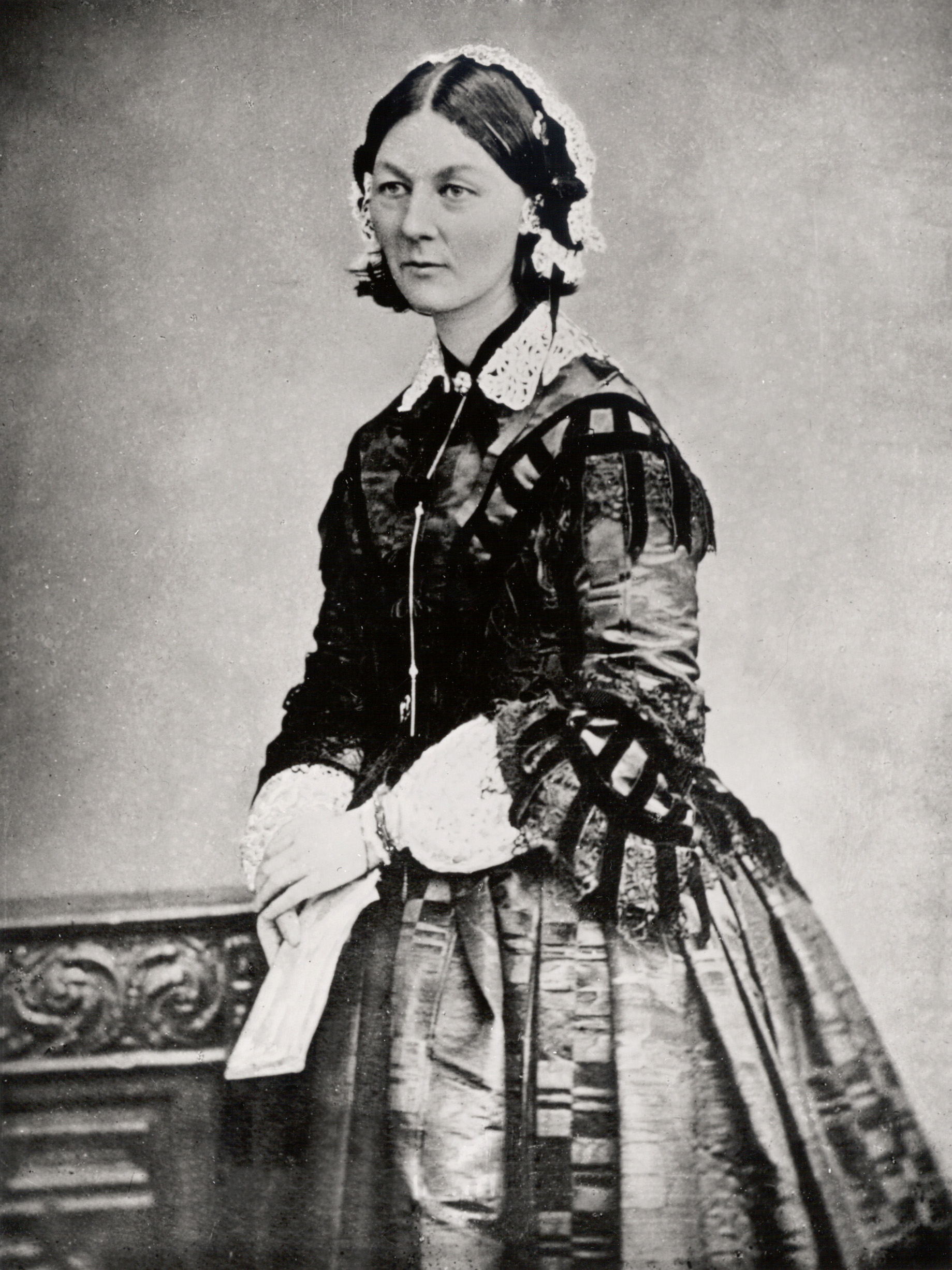
Florence Nightingale

- January 10 – Louisa Lane Drew, actress, prominent theater manager, grandmother of the Barrymores (d. 1897)
- January 14 – Bezalel HaKohen, Russian rabbi (d. 1878)
- January 17 – Anne Brontë, English author (d. 1849)
- January 20 – Alexandre-Émile Béguyer de Chancourtois, French chemist and mineralogist (d. 1886)
- January 30 – Concepción Arenal, Spanish feminist writer, activist (d. 1893)
- February 8 – William Tecumseh Sherman, American Civil War general (d. 1891)
- February 13 – James Geiss, English businessman (d. 1878)
- February 15
  - Susan B. Anthony, American suffragist (d. 1906)
  - Arvid Posse, 2nd Prime Minister of Sweden (d. 1901)
- February 17 – Henri Vieuxtemps, Belgian violinist and composer (d. 1881)
- February 28 – John Tenniel, English illustrator (d. 1914)
- March 2 – Eduard Douwes Dekker, Dutch writer (d. 1887)
- March 3 – Henry D. Cogswell, American temperance movement pioneer who endowed a number of Cogswell fountains (d. 1900)
- March 4 – Francesco Bentivegna, Italian revolutionary (d. 1856)
- March 4 – Alexander Worthy Clerk, Jamaican Moravian teacher and missionary (d. 1906)
- March 9 – Samuel Blatchford, Associate Justice of the Supreme Court of the United States (d. 1893)
- March 14 – Victor Emmanuel II of Italy (d. 1878)
- March 17 – Martin Jenkins Crawford, American politician (d. 1883)
- March 20 – Alexandru Ioan Cuza, Romania's first reigning Domnitor (d. 1873)
- April 27 – Herbert Spencer, English philosopher (d. 1903)
- April 26 – Alice Cary, American poet, sister to Phoebe Cary (1824–1871) (d. 1871)
- May 5 – Elkanah Billings, Canadian paleontologist (d. 1876)
- May 12 – Florence Nightingale, English nurse (d. 1910)
- May 23 – Lorenzo Sawyer, 9th Chief Justice of the Supreme Court of California (d. 1891)
- May 25 – François Claude du Barail, French general and Minister of War (d. 1902)
- May 27 – Mathilde Bonaparte, Italian princess (d. 1904)

=== July–December ===
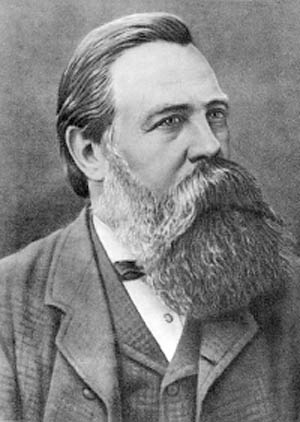
Friedrich Engels

- July 5 – William John Macquorn Rankine, Scottish physicist, engineer (d. 1872)
- July 22 – Oliver Mowat, Canadian lawyer, politician (d. 1903)
- July 23 – Julia Gardiner Tyler, First Lady of the United States (d. 1889)
- July 25 – Henry Doulton, English potter (d. 1897)
- September 17
  - Émile Augier, French dramatist (d. 1889)
  - Earl van Dorn, American Confederate general (d. 1863)
- September 20 – John F. Reynolds, American general (d. 1863)
- September 27 – Wilhelm Siegmund Teuffel, German classical scholar (d. 1878)
- September 29 – Henri, Count of Chambord, claimant to the French throne (d. 1883)
- October 5 – David Wilber, American politician (d. 1890)
- October 6 – Jenny Lind, Swedish soprano (d. 1887)
- October 16 – Gillis Bildt, 5th Prime Minister of Sweden (d. 1894)
- October 20 – Benjamin F. Cheatham, American Confederate general (d. 1886)
- October 22 - Ossian Euclid Dodge, American singer and performer (d. 1876)
- November 23
  - Isaac Todhunter, English mathematician (d. 1884)
  - Ludwig von Hagn, German painter (d. 1898)
- November 28 – Friedrich Engels, German social philosopher (d. 1895)
- December 21 – William H. Osborn, American railroad executive (d. 1894)

=== Date unknown ===
- Song Qing, Chinese general (d. 1902)

1821

=== January–March ===
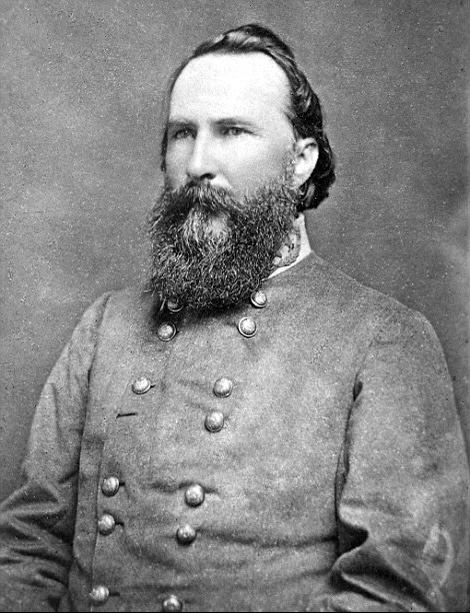
James Longstreet

- January 1 – Francisco de Paula Milán Mexican officier of the Mexican Army (d. 1883)
- January 2 – Catherine Huggins, British actor, singer, director and manager (d. 1887)
- January 8
  - James Longstreet, American Confederate general (d. 1904)
  - W. H. L. Wallace, American Civil War general (d. 1862)
- February 3 – Elizabeth Blackwell, first American female physician (d. 1910)
- February 11 – Auguste Edouard Mariette, French Egyptologist (d. 1881)
- February 17 – Lola Montez, Irish-Spanish dancer, royal mistress (d. 1861)
- February 19
  - Francis Preston Blair Jr., American politician, American Civil War officer (d. 1875)
  - August Schleicher, German linguist (d. 1868)
- March 1 – Joseph Hubert Reinkens, German Old Catholic bishop (d. 1896)
- March 9 – John Watts de Peyster, American author, philanthropist, and soldier (d. 1907)
- March 12 – Sir John Abbott, 3rd Prime Minister of Canada (d. 1893)
- March 31 – Henry Dunning Macleod, Scottish economist (d. 1902)

=== April–June ===
- April 1 – Princess Anka Obrenović, Serbian princess (d. 1868)
- April 3 – Fr. Thomas Pelham Dale, English mystic (d. 1892)
- April 9 – Charles Baudelaire, French poet, writer (d. 1867)
- April 12 – Beauchamp Seymour, British admiral (d. 1895)
- May 6
  - Edmund Colhoun, American admiral (d. 1897)
  - Emilie Hammarskjöld, Swedish-American musician (d. 1854)
- May 8 – William Henry Vanderbilt, American entrepreneur (d. 1885)
- May 16 – Pafnuty Chebyshev, Russian mathematician (d. 1894)
- May 17 – Sebastian Kneipp, German naturopath (d. 1897)
- May 18 – Eduard von Pestel, Prussian military officer and German general (d. 1908)
- May 24 – Juan Bautista Topete, Spanish admiral and politician (d. 1885)
- June 2 – Ion C. Brătianu, 2-Time Prime Minister of Romania (d. 1891)
- June 16 – Old Tom Morris, Scottish golfer (d. 1908)
- June 26 – Bartolomé Mitre, Argentine statesman, military figure, and author, 6th President of Argentina (d. 1906)

=== July–September ===
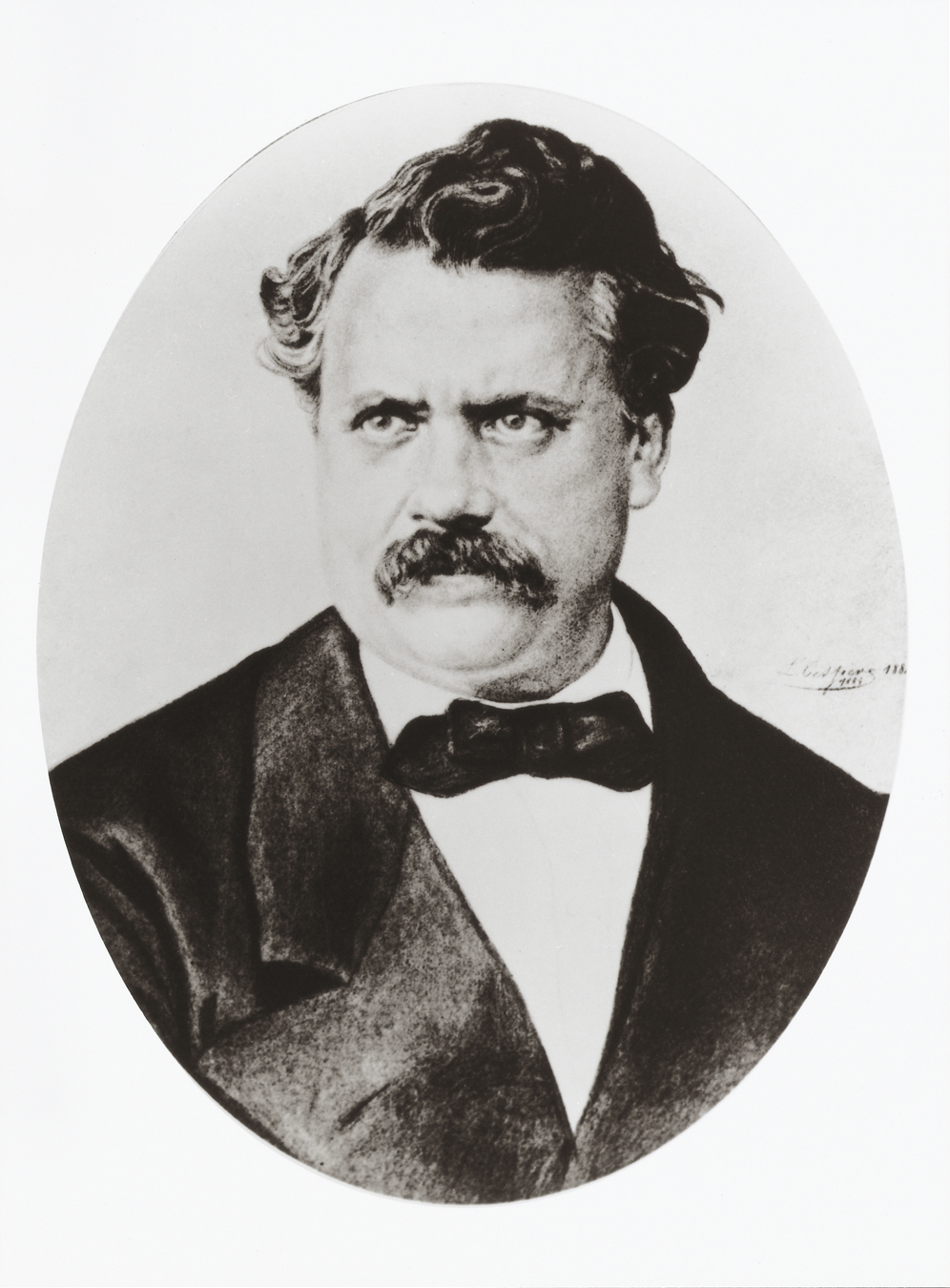
Louis Vuitton

- July 1 – Anatole Jean-Baptiste Antoine de Barthélemy, French archaeologist (d. 1904)
- July 2 – Sir Charles Tupper, 6th Prime Minister of Canada (d. 1915)
- July 6 – Edmund Pettus, American politician (d. 1907)
- July 9
  - George Cavendish-Bentinck, British Conservative politician (d. 1891)
  - Adolphus Frederick Alexander Woodford, British parson (d. 1887)
- July 13 – Nathan Bedford Forrest, American Confederate Civil War General, first Grand Wizard of the Ku Klux Klan (d. 1877)
- July 16 – Mary Baker Eddy, American founder of Christian Science (d. 1910)
- July 17 – Friedrich Engelhorn, German industrialist and founder of BASF (d. 1902)
- July 18
  - Lucy Smith Millikin, early Latter Day Saint and sister of Joseph Smith (d. 1882)
  - Pauline Viardot, French mezzo-soprano, composer (d. 1910)
- July 24 – William Poole, infamous member of New York City's Bowery Boys gang (d. 1855)
- July 27 – George H. Cooper, United States Navy admiral (d. 1891)
- August 10 – Jay Cooke, American financier (d. 1905)
- August 16 – Arthur Cayley, English mathematician (d. 1895)
- August 21 – Louis Vuitton, French fashion designer (d. 1892)
- August 31 – Hermann von Helmholtz, German physician and physicist (d. 1894)
- September 21 – Andrei Alexandrovich Popov, Russian admiral (d. 1898)
- September 28 – Jonathan Clarkson Gibbs, African-American minister, politician (d. 1874)

=== October–December ===
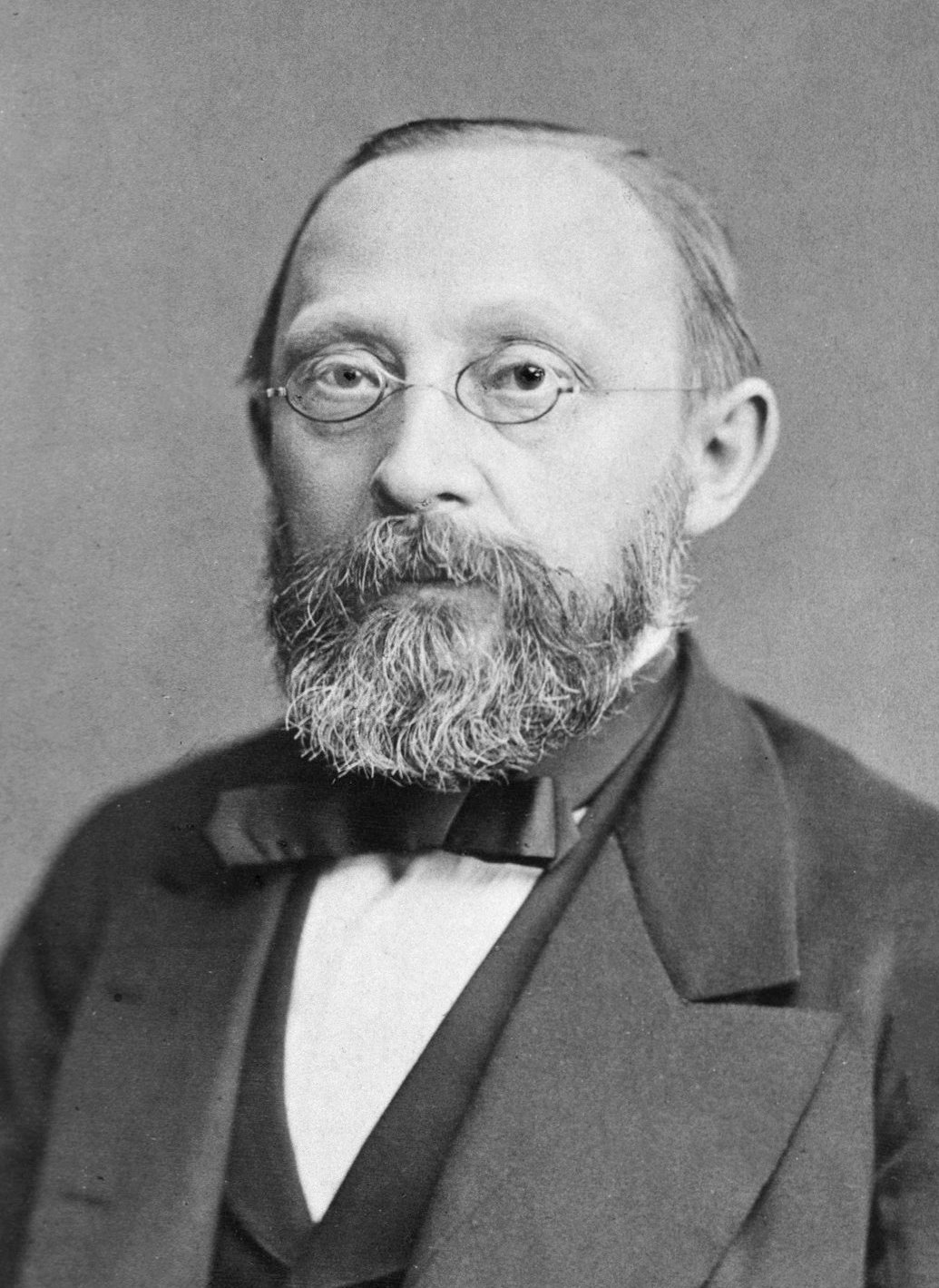
Rudolf Virchow

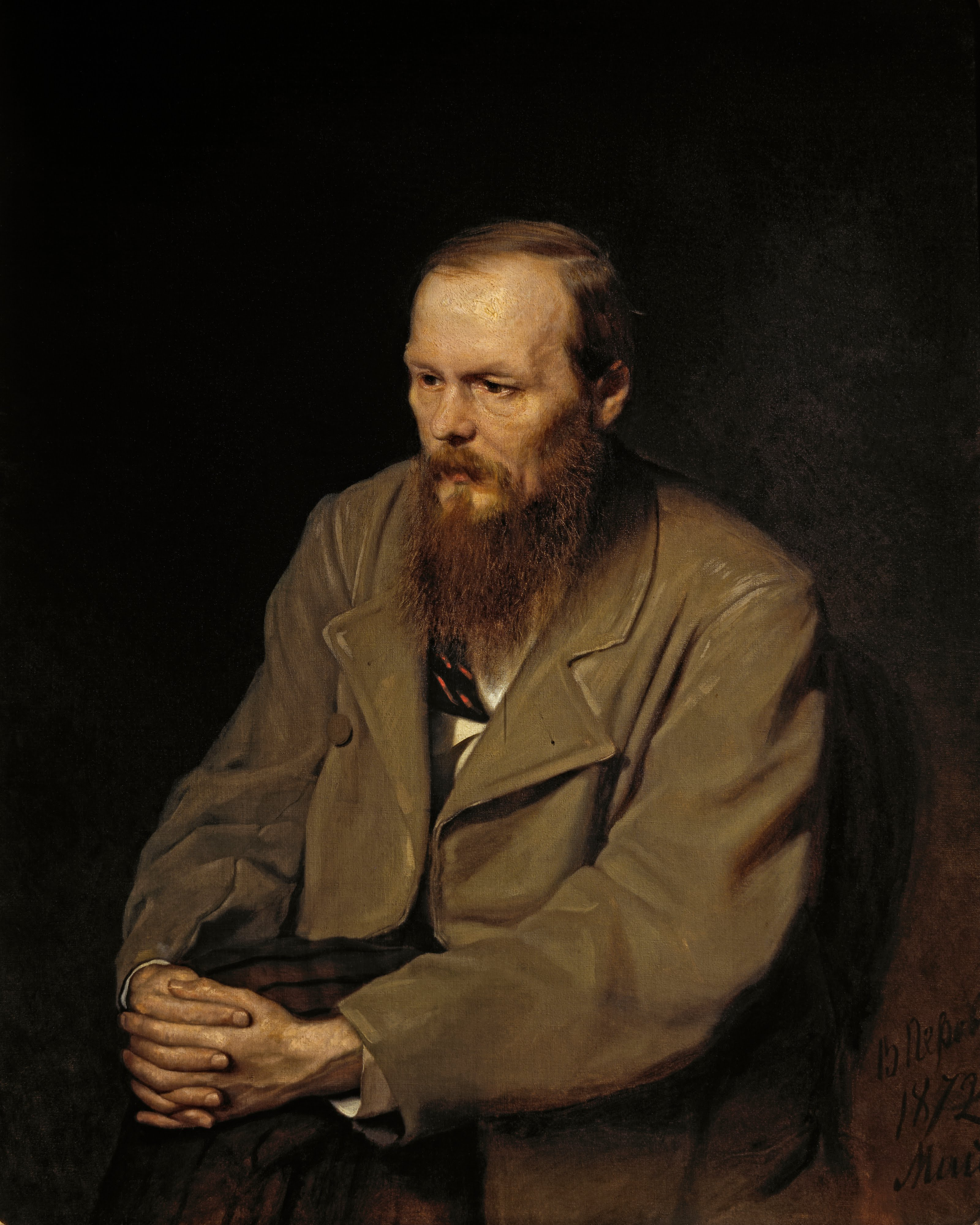
Fyodor Dostoyevsky

- October 13 – Rudolf Virchow, German physician, pathologist, biologist, and politician (d. 1902)
- October 17 – Alexander Gardner, Scottish photographer (d. 1882)
- November 7 – Andrea Debono, Maltese trader and explorer (d. 1871)
- November 11 – Fyodor Dostoyevsky, Russian writer (d. 1881)
- November 24 – Henry Thomas Buckle, English historian sometimes called "the father of scientific history" (d. 1862)
- November 26 – Miguel Lobo y Malagamba, Spanish admiral (d. 1876)
- November 30 – Frederick Temple, Archbishop of Canterbury (d. 1902)
- December 1 – John M. B. Clitz, American admiral (d. 1897)
- December 12 – Gustave Flaubert, French writer (d. 1880)
- December 22 – Junius Brutus Booth Jr., American actor, theatre manager (d. 1883)
- December 24 – Gabriel García Moreno, former President of Ecuador (d. 1875)
- December 25 – Clara Barton, first president of American Red Cross (d. 1912)

=== Date unknown ===
- Giuseppe Bonavia, Maltese architect (d. 1885)
- Mazhar Nanautawi, Indian freedom struggle activist (d. 1885)
- Tirso Salaverría, military and politician (d.1901)

1822

=== January–June ===
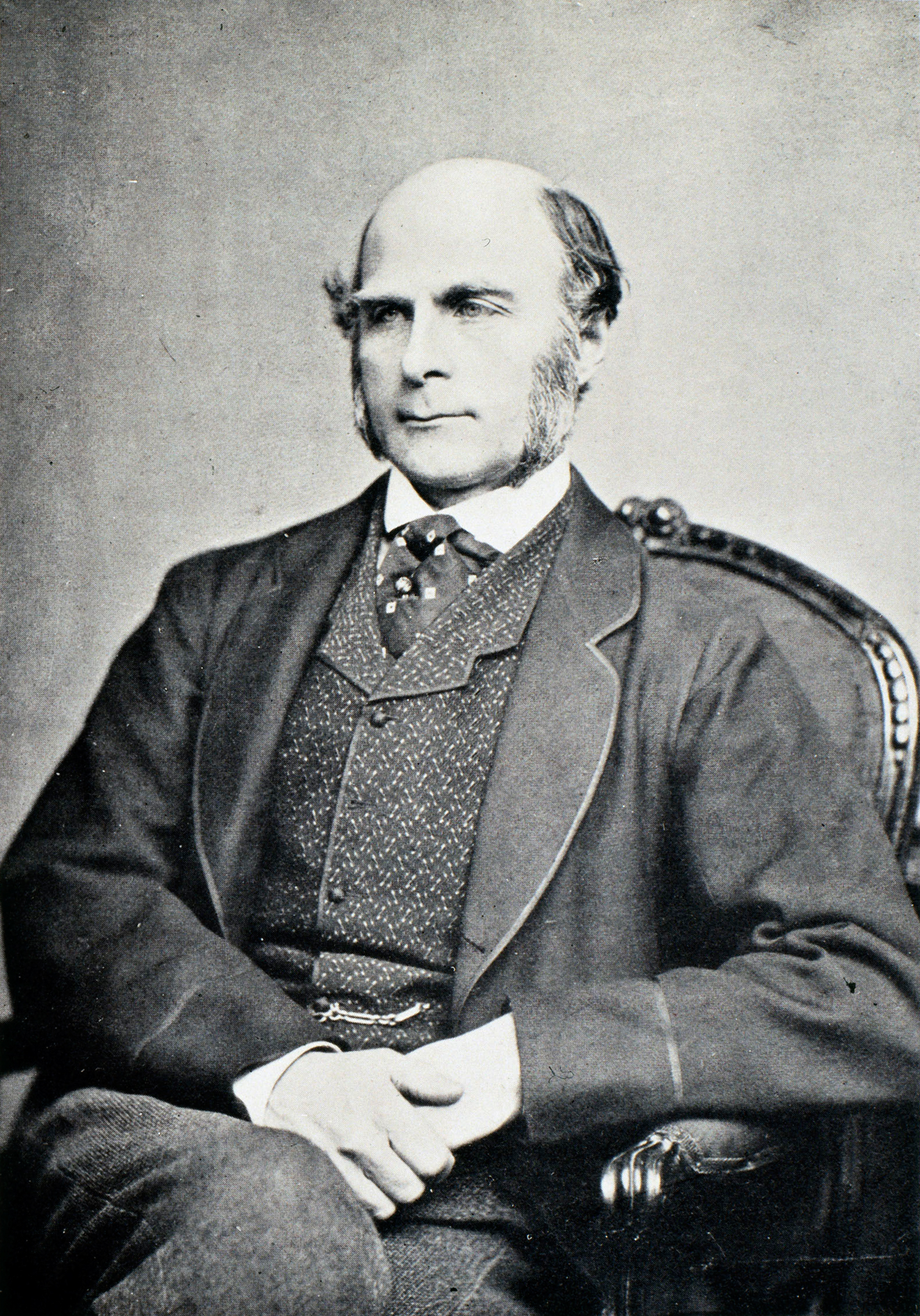
Francis Galton

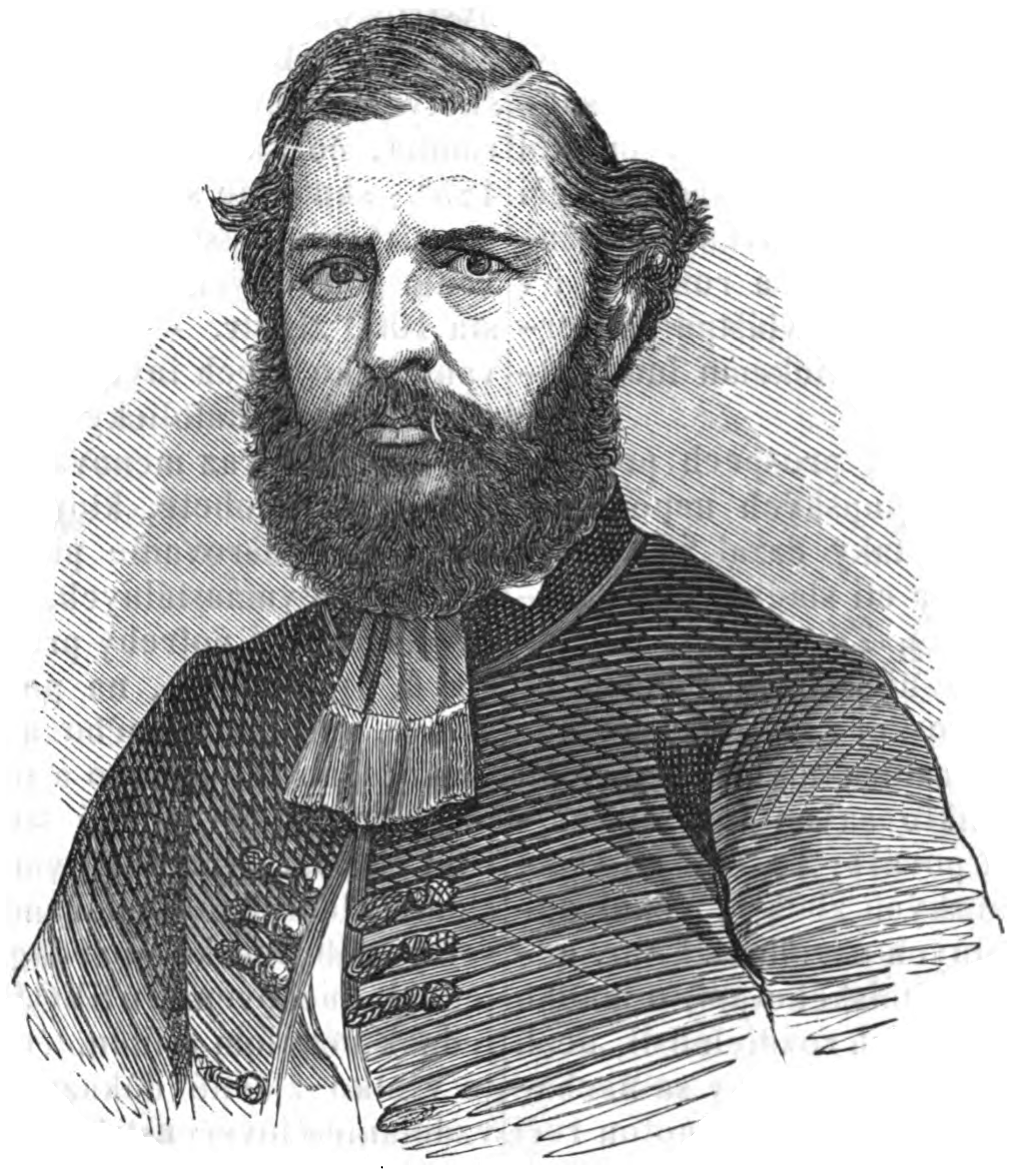
Ján Francisci-Rimavský

- January 2 – Rudolf Clausius, German physicist (d. 1888)
- January 6
  - Menyhért Lónyay, 5th Prime Minister of Hungary (d. 1884)
  - Heinrich Schliemann, German archaeologist (d. 1890)
- January 9 – Carol Benesch, Silesian and Romanian architect (d. 1896)
- January 12 – Étienne Lenoir, Belgian engineer (d. 1900)
- January 25 – Charles Reed Bishop, American businessman, philanthropist in Hawaii (d. 1915)
- January 28 – Alexander Mackenzie, 2nd Prime Minister of Canada (d. 1892)
- February 4 – Edward Fitzgerald Beale, American Navy Lieutenant, explorer (d. 1893)
- February 16 – Sir Francis Galton, English biologist (d. 1911)
- c. March – Harriet Tubman (born Araminta Ross), African-American abolitionist, humanitarian and spy (d. 1913)
- March 14 – Teresa Cristina of the Two Sicilies, Empress consort of Brazil (d. 1889)
- April 3 – Edward Everett Hale, American writer (d. 1909)
- April 26 – Frederick Law Olmsted, American landscape architect (d. 1903)
- April 27 – Ulysses S. Grant, 18th President of the United States (d. 1885)
- May 3 – István Bittó, 7th Prime Minister of Hungary (d. 1903)
- May 18 – Mathew Brady, American photographer (d. 1896)
- May 20 – Frédéric Passy, French economist, recipient of the Nobel Peace Prize (d. 1912)
- May 26 – Edmond de Goncourt, French writer (d. 1896)
- May 11 – Henry Baker Tristram, English clergyman, ornithologist. (d. 1906)
- June 10 – John Jacob Astor III, American businessman (d. 1890)

=== July–December ===
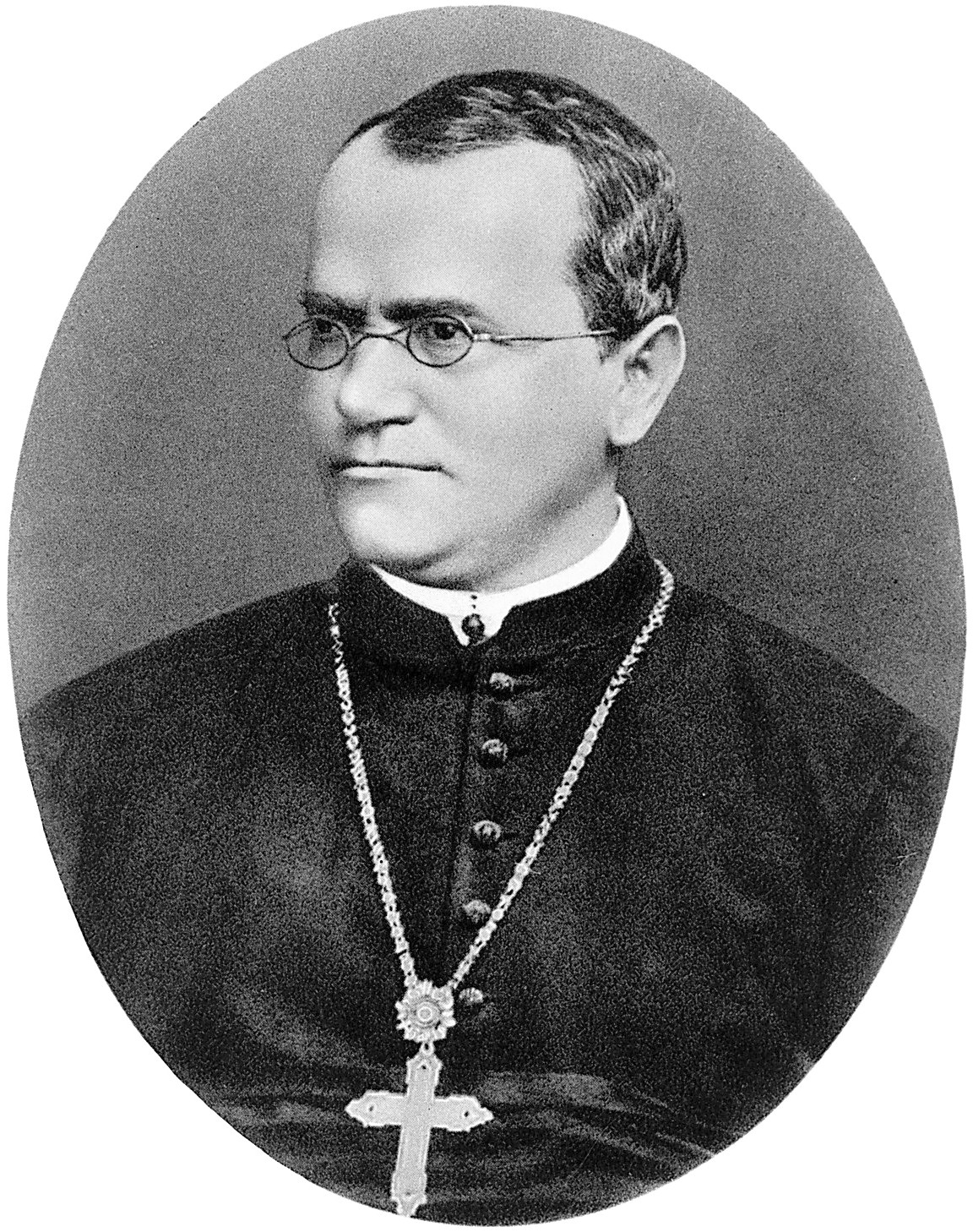
Gregor Mendel

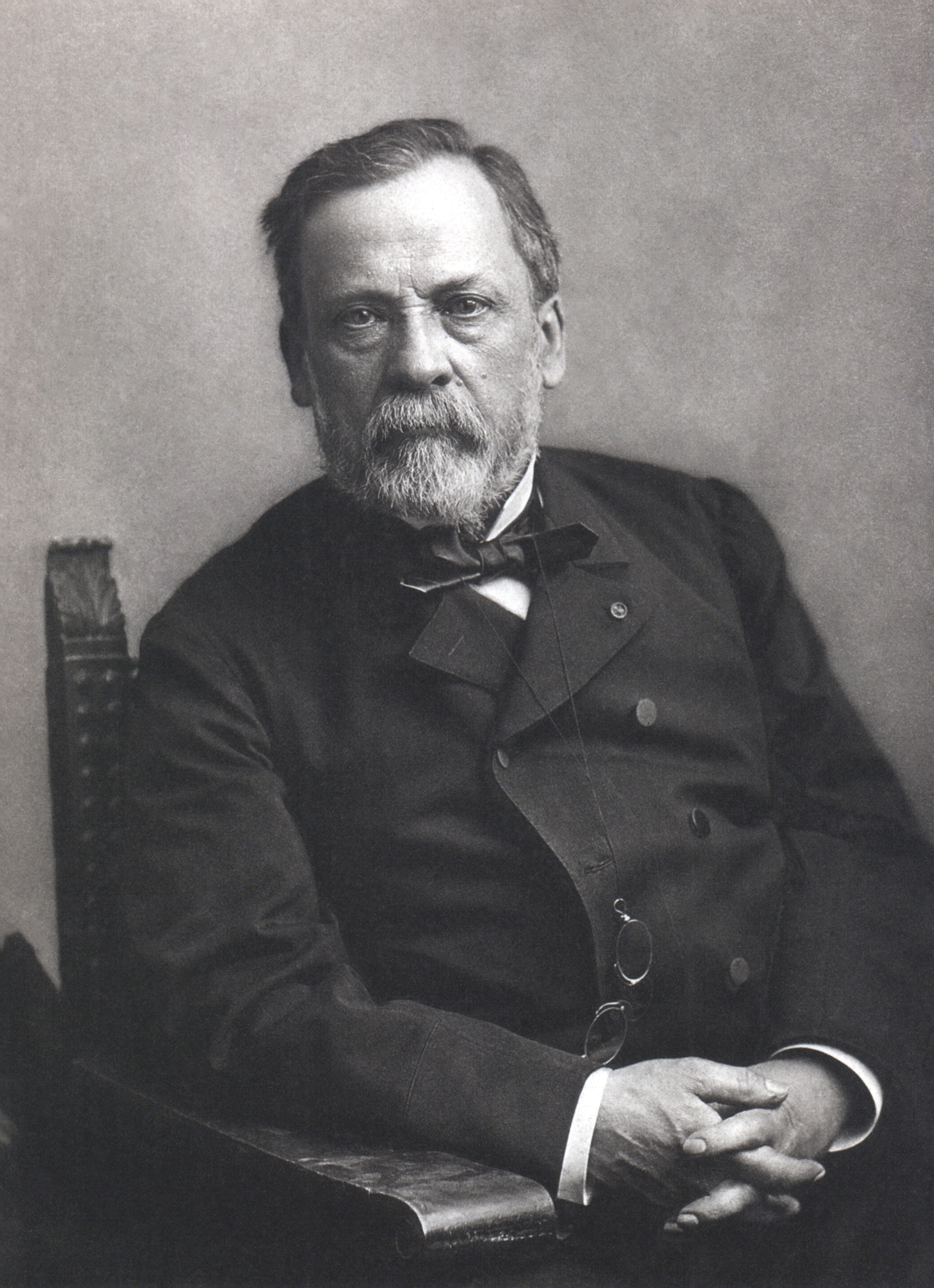
Louis Pasteur

- July 4 – Jean-Baptiste Claude Eugène Guillaume, French sculptor (d. 1905)
- July 19 – Princess Augusta of Cambridge (d. 1916)
- July 20 – Gregor Mendel, Czech geneticist (d. 1884)
- July 21 – Elizabeth Herbert, Baroness Herbert of Lea, English Catholic writer, translator, philanthropist, and influential social figure (d. 1911)
- July 25 – Andrew Bryson, American admiral (d. 1892)
- August 12 – August von Bulmerincq, Baltic German legal scholar (d. 1890)
- August 27 – William Hayden English, American politician (d. 1896)
- September 22 – Avraamy Aslanbegov, Russian admiral and historian (d. 1900)
- October 4 – Rutherford B. Hayes, 19th President of the United States (d. 1893)
- October 6 – Benjamin F. Isherwood, American admiral, United States Navy Engineer-in-Chief (d. 1915)
- December 10 – César Franck, Belgian composer, organist (d. 1890)
- December 24 – Matthew Arnold, English poet (d. 1888)
- December 27 – Louis Pasteur, French microbiologist, chemist (d. 1895)

1823

=== January–June ===
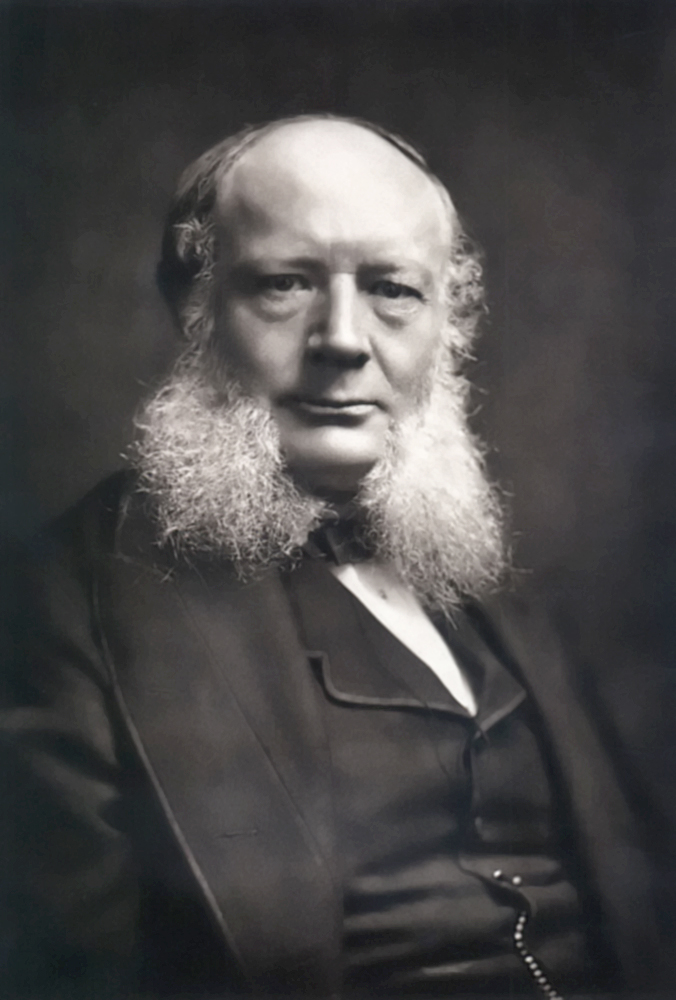
Carl Wilhelm Siemens

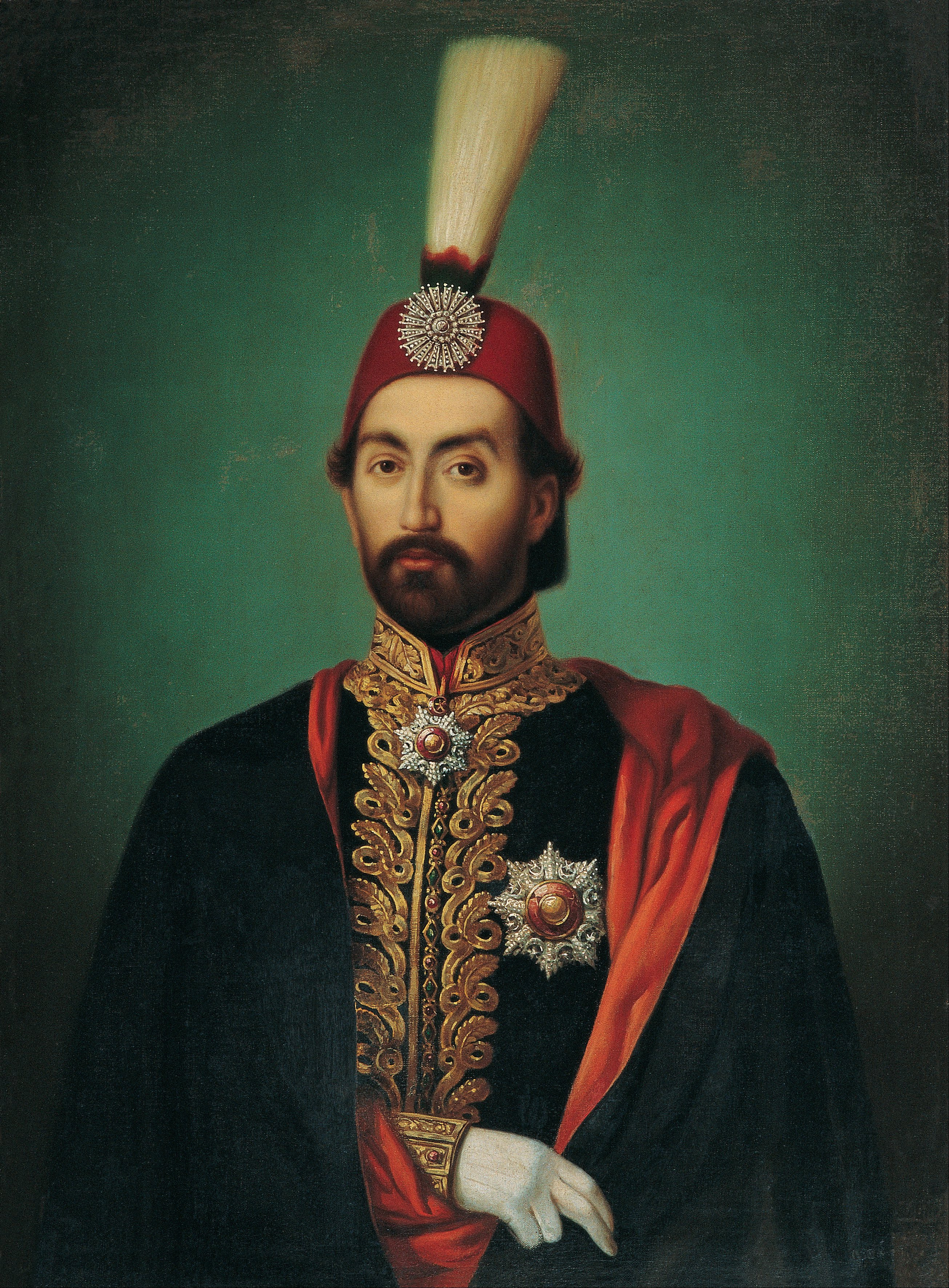
Abdülmecid I

- January 1 – Sándor Petőfi, Hungarian poet, revolutionary (d. 1849)
- January 3 – Robert Whitehead, English engineer, inventor (d. 1905)
- January 8 – Alfred Russel Wallace, British naturalist, biologist (d. 1913)
- January 11 – Pierre Philippe Denfert-Rochereau, French military officer and politician (d. 1878)
- January 27 – Édouard Lalo, French composer (d. 1892)
- February 15 – Li Hongzhang, Chinese politician, general and diplomat (d. 1901)
- February 28
  - Frederick Francis II, Grand Duke of Mecklenburg-Schwerin (d. 1883)
  - Ernest Renan, French philosopher, philologist, historian and writer (d. 1892)
- March 3 – John George Adair, Scots-Irish businessman and landowner; also known as "Black Jack" for his eviction of 244 people in 1861; financier of JA Ranch (d. 1885)
- March 8 – Gyula Andrássy, 4th Prime Minister of Hungary (d. 1890)
- March 14 – Théodore de Banville, French writer (d. 1891)
- March 18 – Antoine Chanzy, French general and colonial governor (d. 1883)
- April 1 – Simon Bolivar Buckner, American soldier, politician and Confederate soldier (d. 1914)
- April 3 – William M. Tweed, American political boss (d. 1878)
- April 4 – Carl Wilhelm Siemens, German engineer (d. 1883)
- April 24 – Sebastián Lerdo de Tejada, 27th President of Mexico (d. 1889)
- April 25 – Abdülmecid I, Ottoman Sultan (d. 1861)
- May 2 – Emma Hardinge Britten (b. Emma Floyd), English-born spiritualist (d. 1899)
- May 9 – Sir Frederick Weld, 6th Prime Minister of New Zealand (d. 1891)
- May 15
  - Thomas Lake Harris, American poet (d. 1906)
  - Youssef Bey Karam, Lebanese nationalist leader (d. 1889)
- May 17 – Henry Eckford, British horticulturist (d. 1905)
- May 22 – Solomon Bundy, American politician (d. 1889)
- May 26 – William Pryor Letchworth, American businessman, philanthropist, founder of Letchworth State Park, New York
- July 6 – Sophie Adlersparre, Swedish feminist (d. 1895)
- June 21 – Jean Chacornac, French astronomer (d. 1873)

=== July–December ===
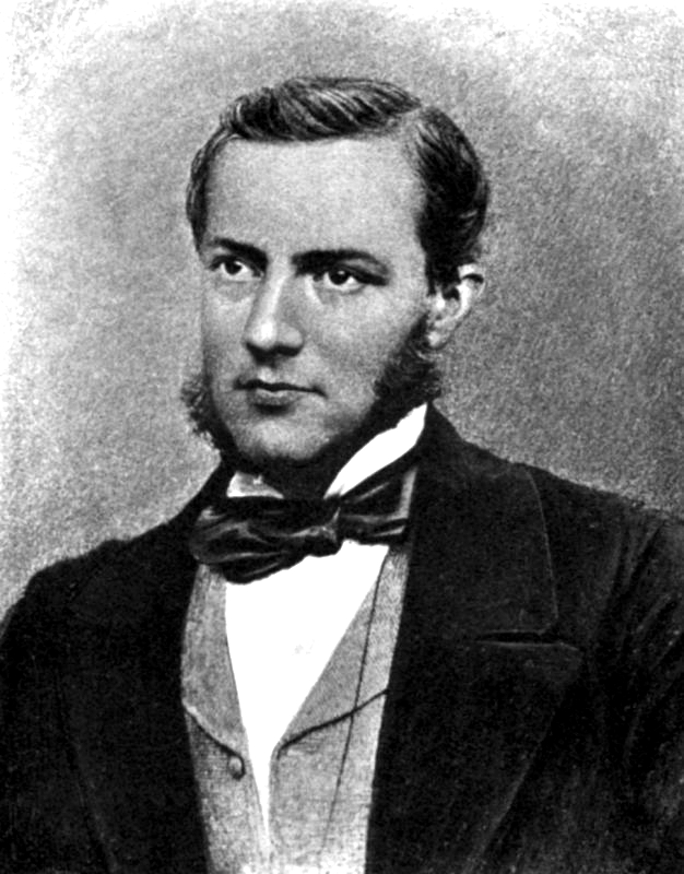
Max Müller

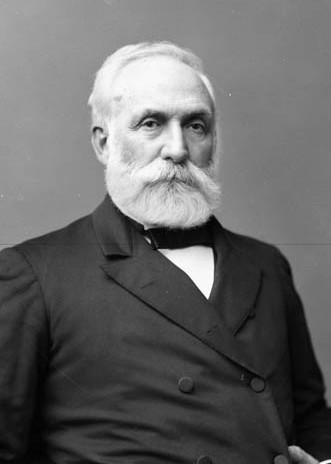
Mackenzie Bowell

- July 9 (date uncertain) – Phineas Gage, improbable American head injury survivor (d. 1860)
- July 18
  - Félix du Temple de la Croix, French Army Captain, aviation pioneer (d. 1890)
  - Leonard Fulton Ross, American Civil War general (d. 1901)
- July 23 – Coventry Patmore, English poet (d. 1896)
- August 3 – Thomas Francis Meagher, American Civil War general (d. 1867)
- August 4 – Oliver P. Morton, American politician (d. 1877)
- August 5 – Eliza Tibbets, mother of the California orange industry (d. 1898)
- August 10
  - Hugh Stowell Brown, Manx preacher (d. 1886)
  - Charles Keene, English artist, illustrator (d. 1891)
- August 11 – Charlotte Mary Yonge, English author (d. 1901)
- August 13 – Goldwin Smith, English historian (d. 1910)
- August 14 – Karel Miry, Belgian composer (d. 1889)
- August 15 – Orris S. Ferry, American Civil War general and politician (d. 1875)
- August 23 – Nil Izvorov, Bulgarian Orthodox priest and venerable (d. 1905)
- September 16 – Ludwik Teichmann, Polish anatomist (d. 1895)
- September 28 – Alexandre Cabanel, French painter (d. 1889)
- November 1 – Lascăr Catargiu, 4-time prime minister of Romania (d. 1899)
- November 8 – Joseph Monier, French inventor (d. 1906)
- November 16 – Henry G. Davis, American politician (d. 1916)
- November 18 – Charles H. Bell, American politician (d. 1893)
- November 21 – Andrzej Jerzy Mniszech, Polish painter (d. 1905)
- November 25 – Henry Wirz, Swiss-born American Confederate military officer, prisoner-of-war camp commander (d. 1865)
- December 6 – Friedrich Max Müller, German-born Orientalist (d. 1900)
- December 9 – Rosalie Olivecrona, Swedish women's rights activist (d. 1898)
- December 13 – Ferdinand Büchner, German composer (d. 1906)
- December 22 – Thomas Wentworth Higginson, American Unitarian minister, abolitionist (d. 1911)
- December 27 – Sir Mackenzie Bowell, 5th Prime Minister of Canada (d. 1917)

=== Undated ===
- Manolache Costache Epureanu, 2-time prime minister of Romania (d. 1880)
- Julian Gutowski, Polish politician (d. 1890)

1824

=== January–June ===
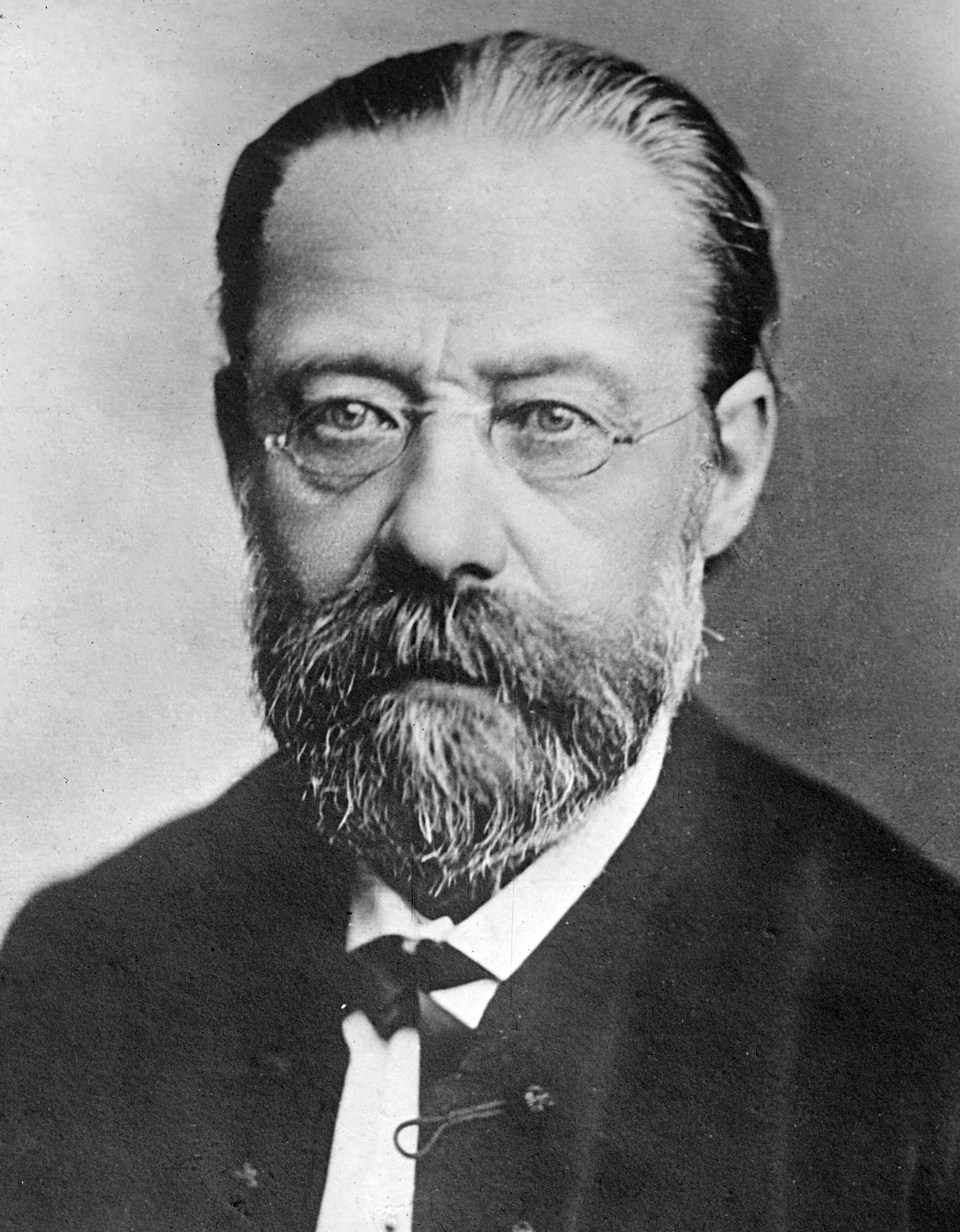
Bedřich Smetana

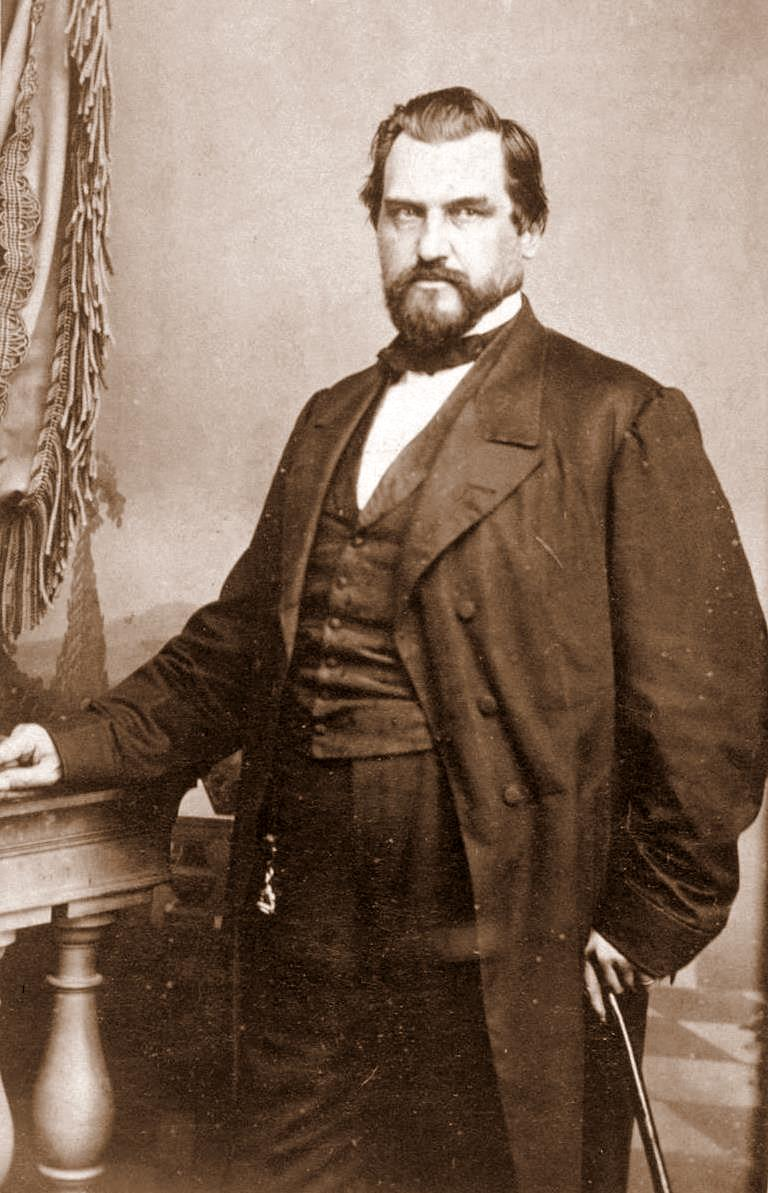
Amasa Leland Stanford

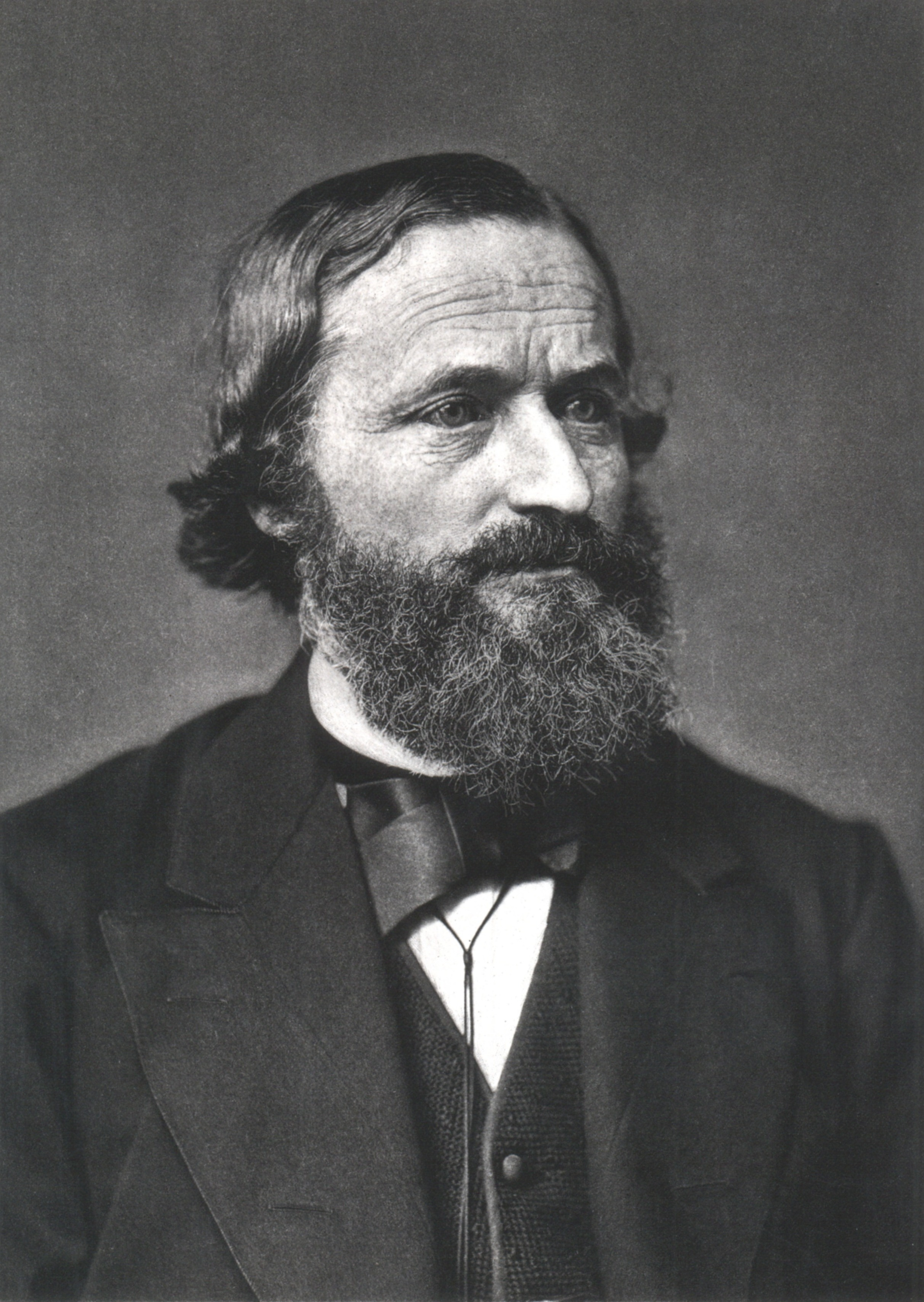
Gustav Kirchhoff

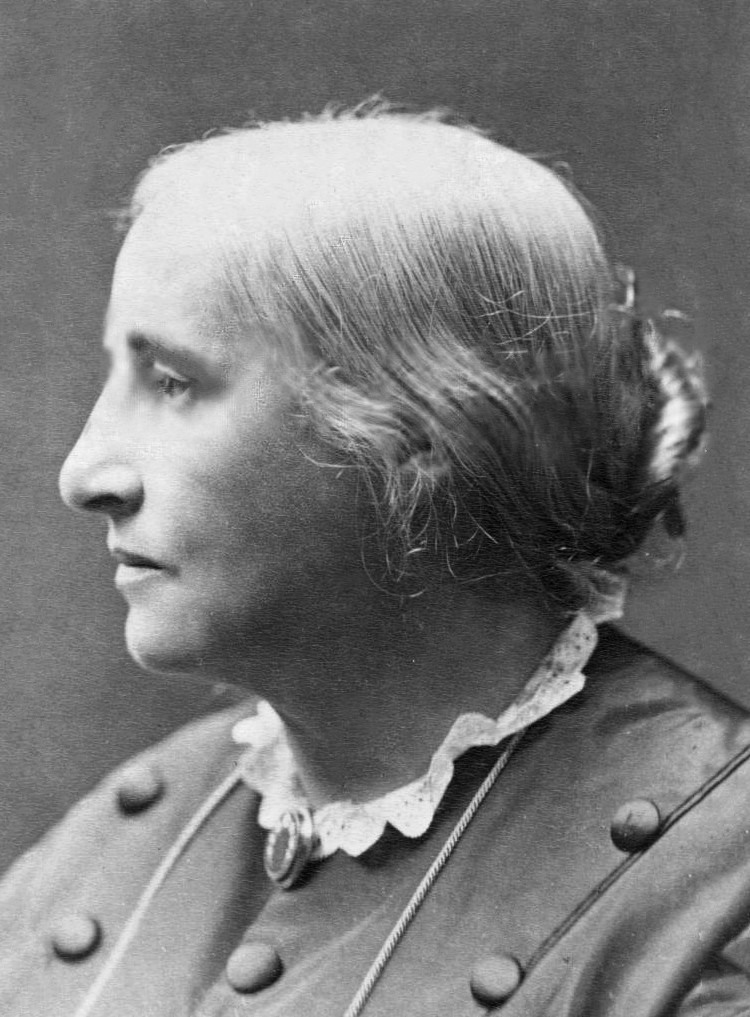
Ednah Dow Littlehale Cheney

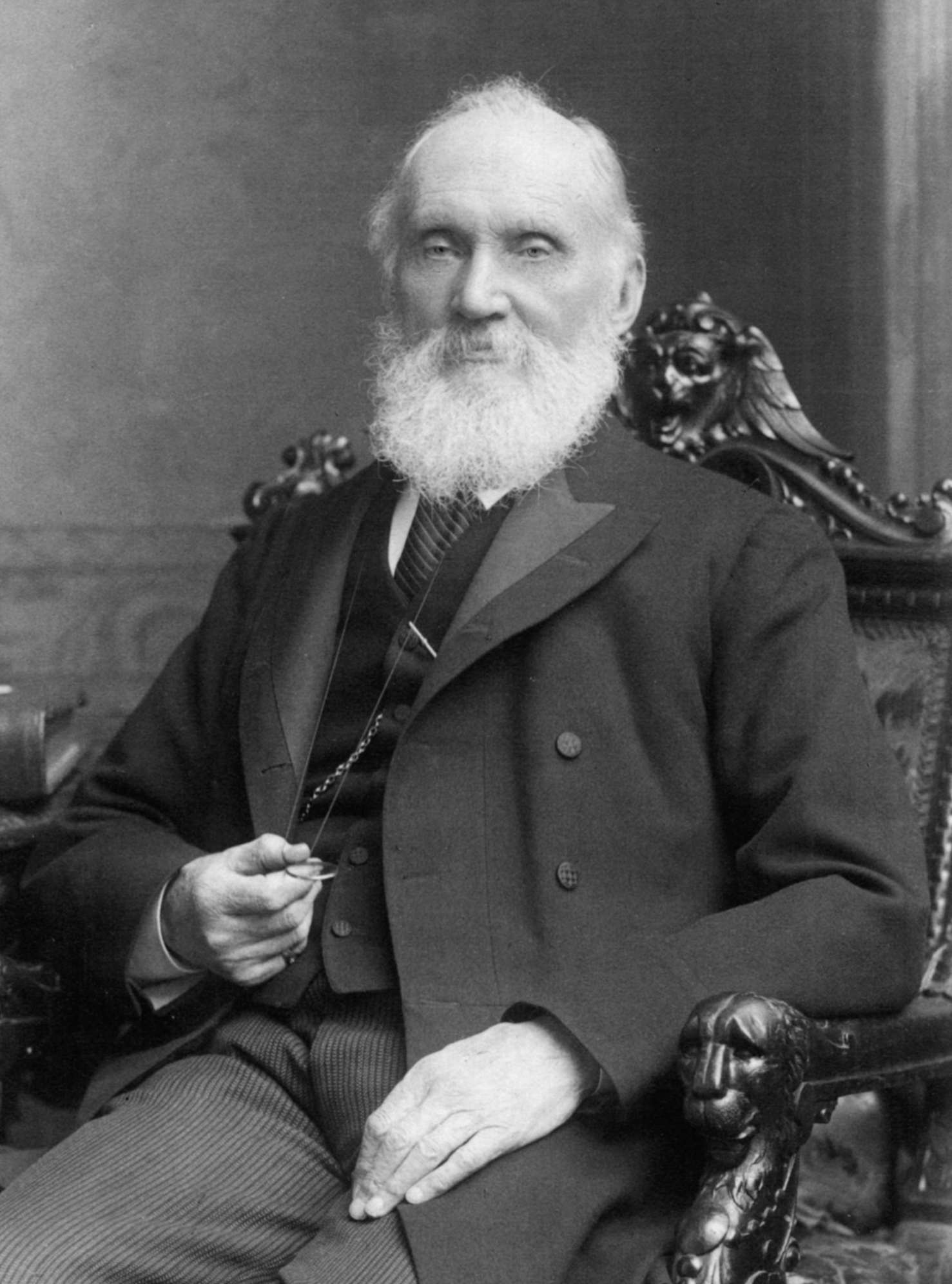
William Thomson, 1st Baron Kelvin

- January 7 – Julia Kavanagh, Irish novelist (d. 1877)
- January 8 – Wilkie Collins, English novelist (d. 1889)
- January 15 – Marie Duplessis, French courtesan (d. 1847)
- January 21 – Thomas Jonathan "Stonewall" Jackson, American Confederate general (d. 1863)
- January 26 – Emil Czyrniański, Polish chemist (d. 1888)
- February 7 – Sir William Huggins, British astronomer (d. 1910)
- February 8 – Barnard Elliott Bee, Jr., American Confederate general (d. 1861)
- February 12 – Dayananda Saraswati, Hindu religious leader, Vedic scholar who founded the reform movement Arya Samaj (d. 1883)
- February 14 – Winfield Scott Hancock, American Civil War Union general, Democratic presidential candidate (d. 1886)
- February 27 – Prince Kuni Asahiko of Japan (d. 1891)
- March 2 – Bedřich Smetana, Czech composer (d. 1884)
- March 9 – Amasa Leland Stanford, American tycoon, industrialist and politician, 8th Governor of California (d. 1893)
- March 12 – Gustav Kirchhoff, German physicist (d. 1887)
- March 19 – William Allingham, Irish author (d. 1889)
- March 22 – Charles Pfizer, German-American chemist, co-founder of Pfizer (d. 1906)
- March 25 – Clinton L. Merriam, American politician (d. 1900)
- March 26 – Julie-Victoire Daubié, French journalist (d. 1874)
- March 27 – Johann Wilhelm Hittorf, German physicist (d. 1914)
- April 6 – George Waterhouse, 7th Prime Minister of New Zealand (d. 1906)
- April 7 – Edward Jones, trespasser who continually broke into Buckingham Palace (d. 1895)
- April 13 – William Alexander, Anglican bishop, Primate of All Ireland (d. 1911)
- May 3 – Pio Siotto, Italian artist, cameo engraver (d. ?)
- May 6 – Tokugawa Iesada, 13th shōgun of Tokugawa shogunate of Japan (d. 1858)
- May 9 – Jacob ben Moses Bachrach, noted Polish-born apologist of Rabbinic Judaism (d. 1896)
- May 23 – Ambrose Burnside, American Civil War general, inventor, politician from Rhode Island (d. 1881)
- June 7 – Bernhard von Gudden, German neuroanatomist, psychiatrist (d. 1886)
- June 8 – Arthur von Mohrenheim, Russian diplomat (d. 1906)
- June 20 – George Edmund Street, British architect (d. 1881)
- June 26 – William Thomson, 1st Baron Kelvin, Irish-born physicist, engineer (d. 1907)
- June 27 – Ednah Dow Littlehale Cheney, American writer, reformer, philanthropist (d. 1904)
- June 28 – Paul Broca, French physician, anthropologist (d. 1880)

=== July–December ===
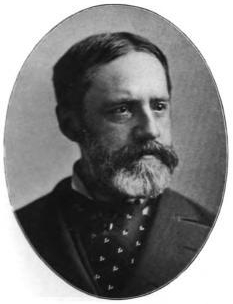
Edward Cooper

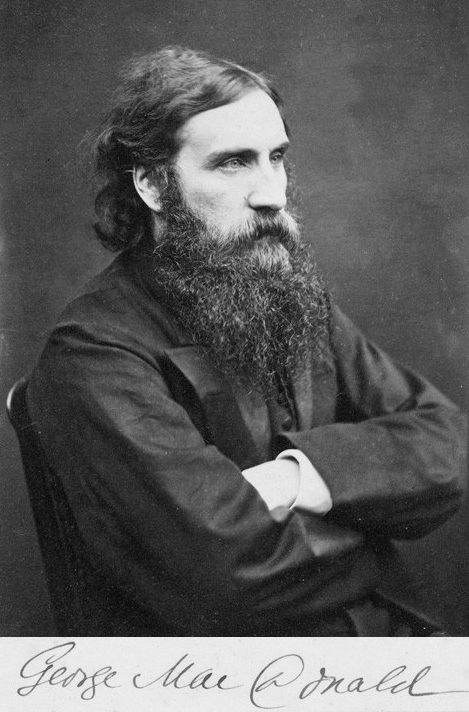
George MacDonald

- July 1 – Casto Méndez Núñez, Spanish admiral (d. 1869)
- July 12 – Eugène Boudin, French painter (d. 1898)
- July 19 – Horace W. Carpentier, American politician, 1st governor of Oakland, California (d. 1918)
- July 21 – Stanley Matthews, American politician, Associate Justice of the Supreme Court of the United States (d. 1889)
- July 27 – Alexandre Dumas, fils, French writer (d. 1895)
- August 3 – William Burnham Woods, Associate Justice of the Supreme Court of the United States (d. 1887)
- August 7 – Gideon T. Stewart, American temperance movement leader (d. 1907)
- August 13 – John J. Robison, American politician in Michigan (d. 1897)
- August 26 – Marie Simon, German nurse (d. 1877)
- September 4
  - Anton Bruckner, Austrian composer (d. 1896)
  - Phoebe Cary, American poet, sister to Alice Cary (1820–1871) (d. 1871)
- September 27 – Benjamin Apthorp Gould, American astronomer (d. 1896)
- October 2 – Henry C. Lord, American railroad executive (d. 1884)
- October 5 – Henry Chadwick, English-born American baseball writer, historian (d. 1908)
- October 18 – Juan Valera y Alcalá-Galiano, Spanish author (d. 1905)
- October 26 – Edward Cooper, 83rd Mayor of New York City (d. 1905)
- October 27 – Edward Maitland, British writer (d. 1897)
- November 20 – Sydenham E. Ancona, American educator, politician and member of the United States House of Representatives from 1861 to 1867 (d. 1913)
- November 24 – Frederick Miller, German-born American brewer, businessman (d. 1888)
- December 10 – George MacDonald, Scottish writer (d. 1905)
- December 11 – Jonathan Letterman, American surgeon, "Father of Battlefield Medicine" (d. 1872)
- December 14 – Pierre Puvis de Chavannes, French painter (d. 1898)
- December 18 – Sir John Hall, 12th Prime Minister of New Zealand (d. 1907)
- December 27 – Charlotta Norberg, Swedish ballerina (d. 1892)

1825

=== January–June ===
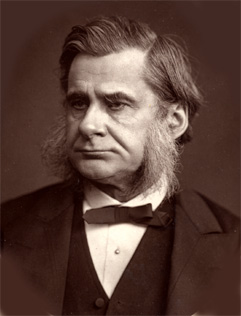
Thomas Henry Huxley

- January 11 – Clement V. Rogers, Cherokee politician, father of Will Rogers (d. 1911)
- January 25 – George Pickett, American Confederate general (d. 1876)
- January 31 – Miska Magyarics, Slovene poet in Hungary (d. 1883)
- February 8 – Henri Giffard, French engineer, pioneer in airship technology (d. 1882)
- February 10 – Geoffrey Hornby, British admiral (d. 1895)
- March 13 – Hans Gude, Norwegian romanticist landscape painter (d. 1903)
- March 16 – Camilo Castelo Branco, Portuguese writer (d. 1890)
- March 21 – Alexander Mozhaysky, Russian aeronautical pioneer (d. 1890)
- March 22 – Jane Sym, second wife of Canada's second prime minister (d. 1893)
- April 11 – Ferdinand Lassalle, Prussian-German philosopher, socialist and politician (d. 1864)
- April 24 – Robert Michael Ballantyne, Scottish novelist (d. 1894)
- May 4 – Thomas Henry Huxley, English biologist (d. 1895)
- May 8 – George Bruce Malleson, English officer, author (d. 1898)
- May 9 – George Davidson, English-born geodesist, astronomer, geographer, surveyor, and engineer in the United States (d. 1911)
- June 3 – Sophie Sager, Swedish women's rights activist (d. 1902)

=== July–December ===
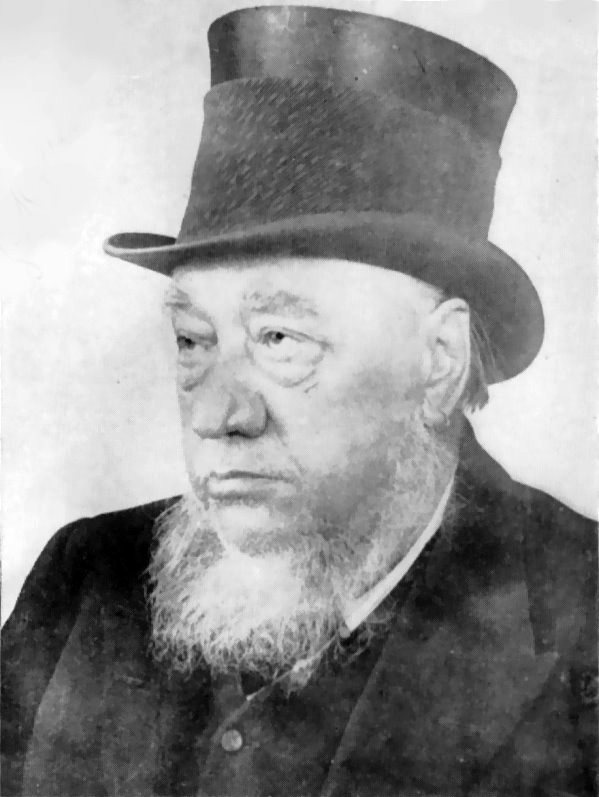
Paul Kruger

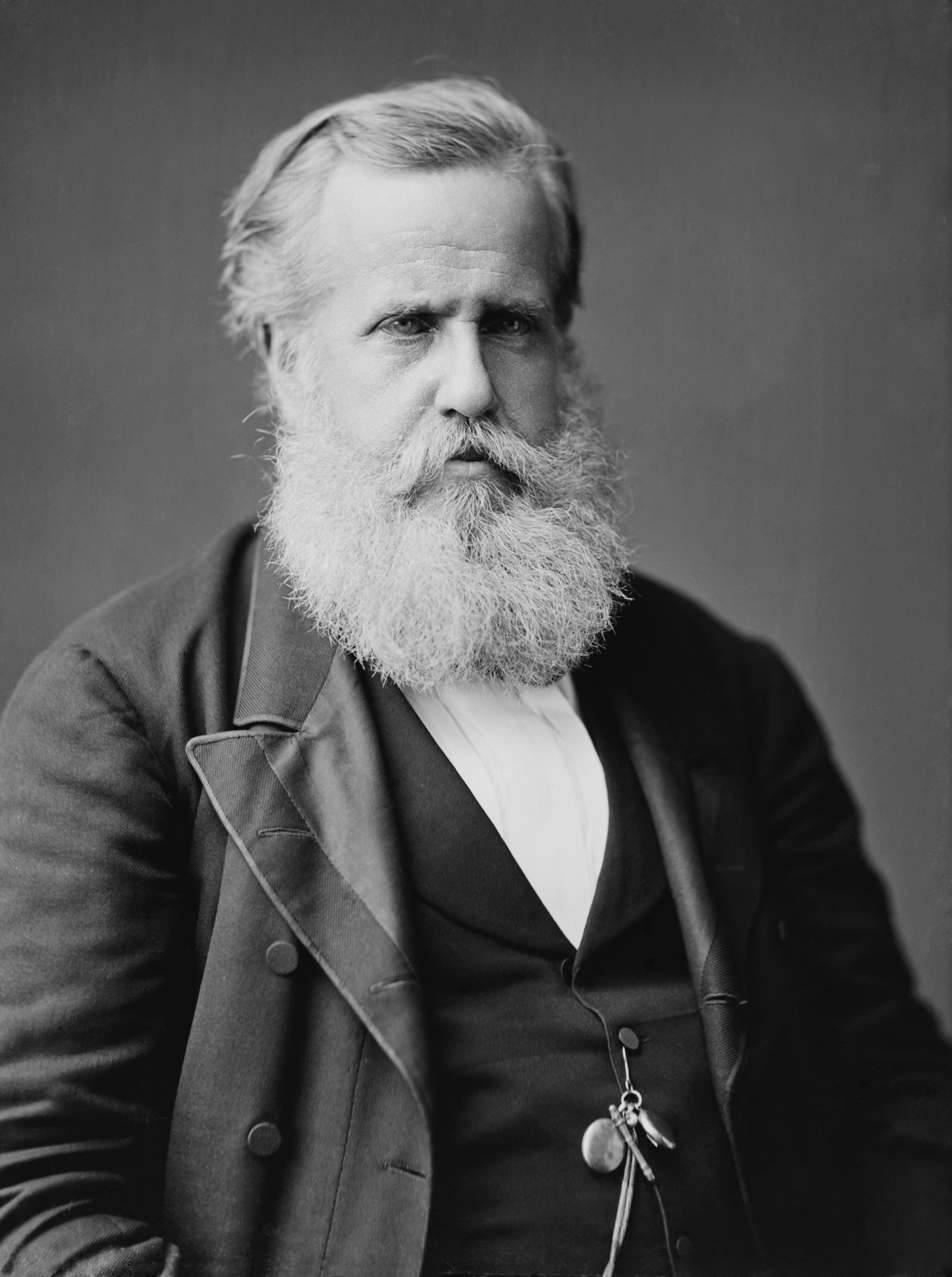
Pedro II of Brazil

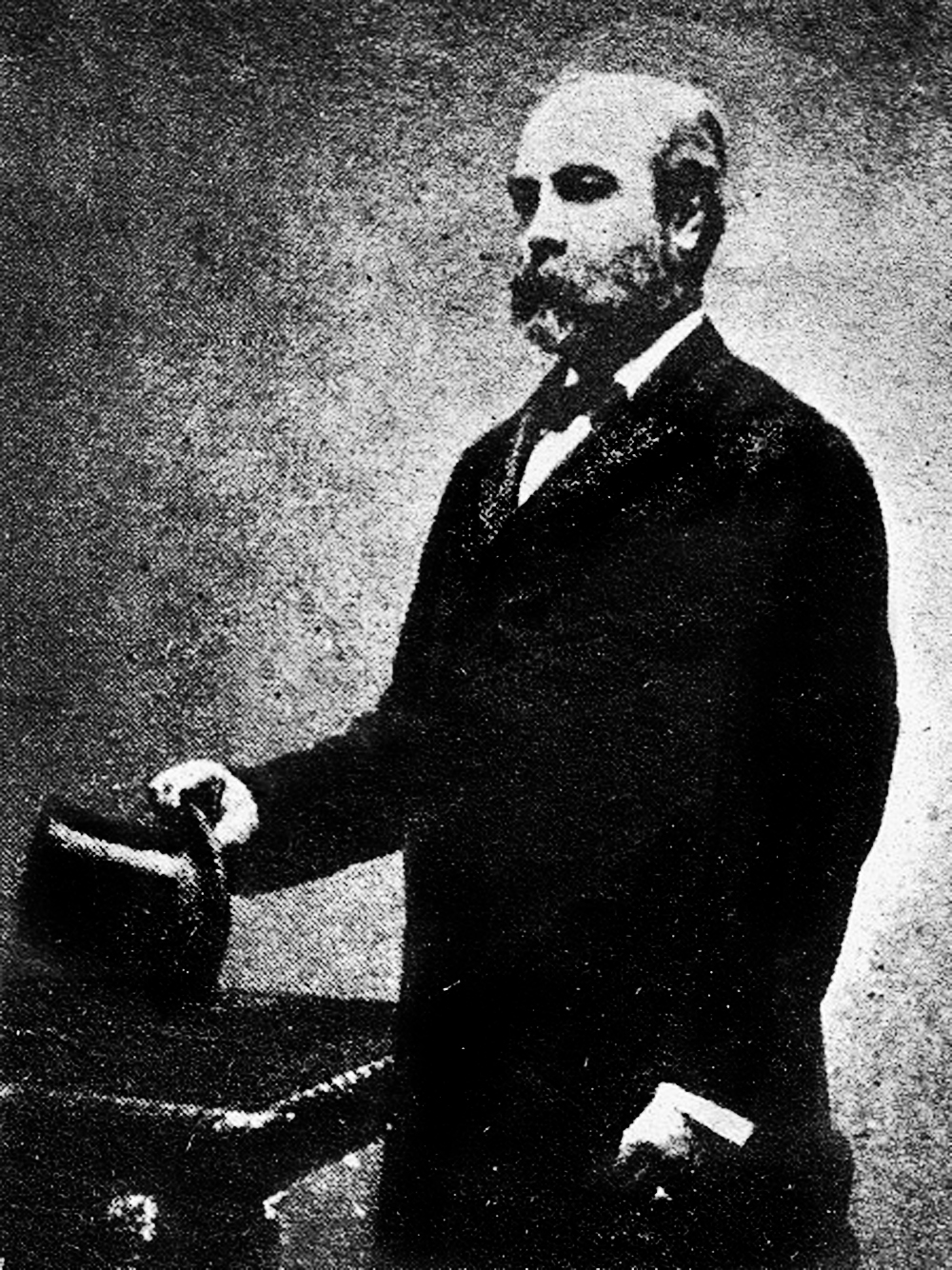
Mariano Prado

- July 2 – Émile Ollivier, French statesman (d. 1913)
- July 19 – George H. Pendleton, American politician (d. 1889)
- July 21 – Práxedes Mateo Sagasta, Spanish politician, eight-time prime minister of Spain (d. 1903)
- August 31 – Robert Dunsmuir, Scottish industrialist, politician (d. 1889)
- September 4 – Dadabhai Naoroji, Indian politician (d. 1917)
- September 11 – Eduard Hanslick, Austrian music critic (d. 1904)
- September 13 – William Henry Rinehart, American sculptor (d. 1874)
- September 17 – Lucius Quintus Cincinnatus Lamar II, American politician, Associate Justice of the Supreme Court of the United States (d. 1893)
- September 25 – Joachim Heer, Swiss politician (d. 1879)
- October 8 – Paschal Beverly Randolph, American occultist (d. 1875)
- October 10 – Paul Kruger, Boer resistance leader (d. 1904)
- October 11 – Maria Firmina dos Reis, Brazilian abolitionist and author (d. 1917)
- October 13 – Charles Frederick Worth, English-born fashion designer, father of haute couture (d. 1895)
- October 25
  - Francis March, American comparative linguist (d. 1911)
  - Johann Strauss, Junior, Austrian composer (d. 1899)
- November 9 – A. P. Hill, American Confederate general (d. 1865)
- November 29 – Jean-Martin Charcot, French physician, neurologist (d. 1893)
- November 30 – William-Adolphe Bouguereau, French painter and educator (d. 1905)
- December 2 – Pedro II, Emperor of Brazil (d. 1891)
- December 18 – Mariano Ignacio Prado, Peruvian general and statesman, twice President of Peru (d. 1901)
- December 30 – Samuel Newitt Wood, American politician (d. 1891)
- December 31 – Elizabeth Martha Olmsted, American poet (d. 1910)

=== Date unknown ===
- Sher Ali Khan, ruler of Afghanistan (d. 1879)
- Juan Williams Rebolledo, Chilean admiral and politician (d. 1910)

1826

=== January–June ===
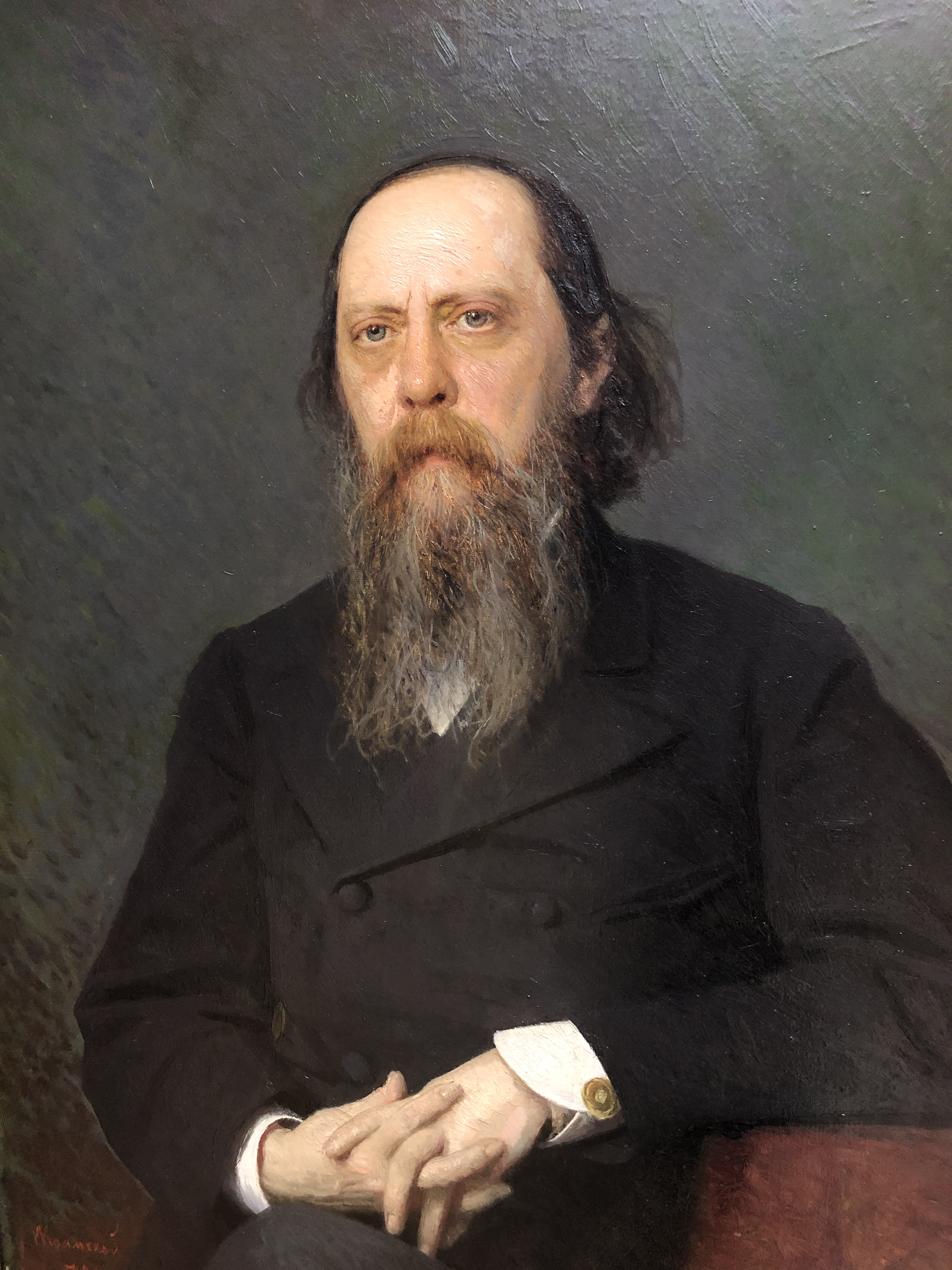
Mikhail Saltykov-Shchedrin

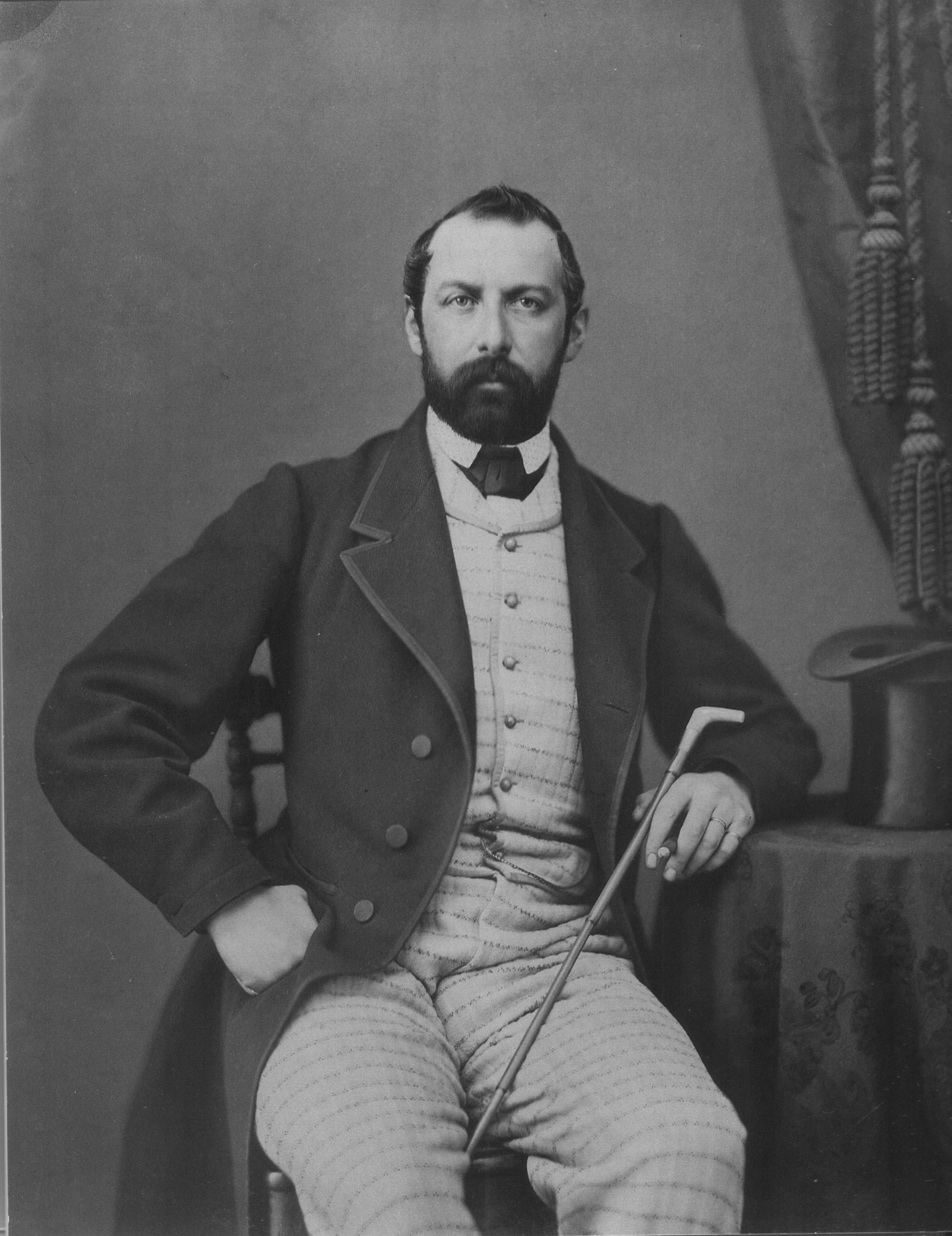
Charles XV, King of Sweden

- January 1 – Mikhail Loris-Melikov, Russian statesman, general (d. 1888)
- January 12 – William Chapman Ralston, American banker, financier (d. 1875)
- January 15 – Marie Pasteur, French chemist (d. 1910)
- January 24 – William Daniel, American temperance movement leader (d. 1897)
- January 26 – Louis Favre, Swiss engineer (d. 1879)
- January 27
  - Mikhail Saltykov-Shchedrin, Russian writer (d. 1889)
  - Richard Taylor, American Confederate general (d. 1879)
- January 30 – Robert F. R. Lewis, American naval officer (d. 1881)
- February 3 – Walter Bagehot, English economist and journalist (d. 1877)
- February 7 – James Edward Jouett, American admiral (d. 1902)
- February 9 – John A. Logan, American soldier, political leader (d. 1886)
- February 15 – George Johnstone Stoney, Anglo-Irish physicist (d. 1911)
- February 16
  - Hans Peter Jørgen Julius Thomsen, Danish chemist (d. 1909)
  - Joseph Victor von Scheffel, German poet (d. 1886)
  - Julia Grant, First Lady of the United States (d. 1902)
- March 3 – Joseph Wharton, American industrialist (d. 1909)
- March 4
  - John Buford, American general (d. 1863)
  - Theodore Judah, American railroad engineer (d. 1863)
- March 24 – Matilda Joslyn Gage, American feminist (d. 1898)
- March 29 – Wilhelm Liebknecht, German journalist, politician (d. 1900)
- April 3
  - Cyrus K. Holliday, cofounder of Topeka, Kansas, first president of the Atchison, Topeka and Santa Fe Railway (d. 1900)
  - Reginald Heber, English priest (b. 1783)
- April 6 – Gustave Moreau, French painter (d. 1898)
- April 23 – Victoriano Sánchez Barcáiztegui, Spanish Navy officer and hero (d. 1875)
- May 3 – Charles XV and IV, King of Sweden and Norway (d. 1872)
- May 4 – Frederic Edwin Church, American painter (d. 1900)
- May 7 – Varina Davis, First Lady of the Confederate States of America (d. 1906)
- May 8 – Miguel Ângelo Lupi, Portuguese painter (d. 1883)
- May 24 – Marie Goegg-Pouchoulin, Swiss international women's rights activist, pacifist (d. 1899)
- May 26 – Richard Christopher Carrington, English astronomer (d. 1875)
- May 28 – Benjamin Gratz Brown, American politician (d. 1885)
- June 24 – George Goyder, surveyor-general of South Australia (d. 1898)
- June 26 – Warren F. Daniell, American politician (d. 1913)
- June 30 – Ozra Amander Hadley, American politician (d. 1915)

=== July–December ===
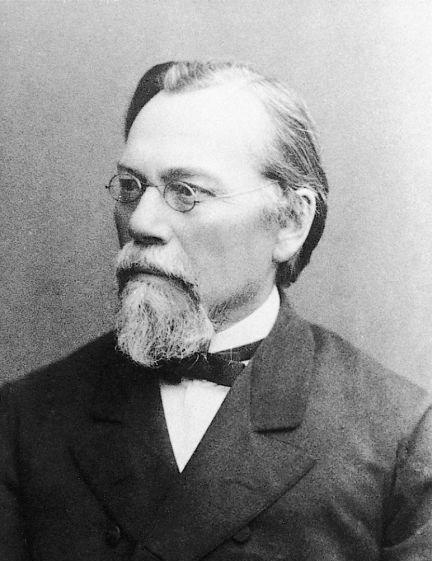
August Ahlqvist

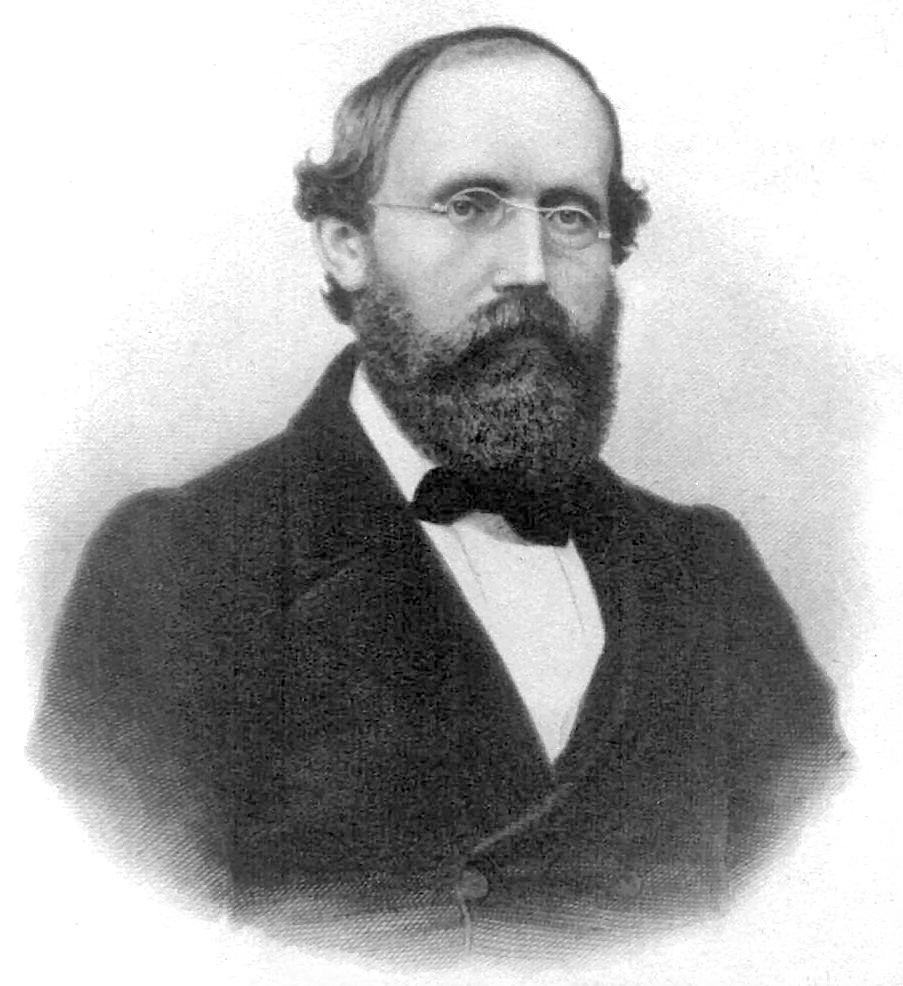
Bernhard Riemann

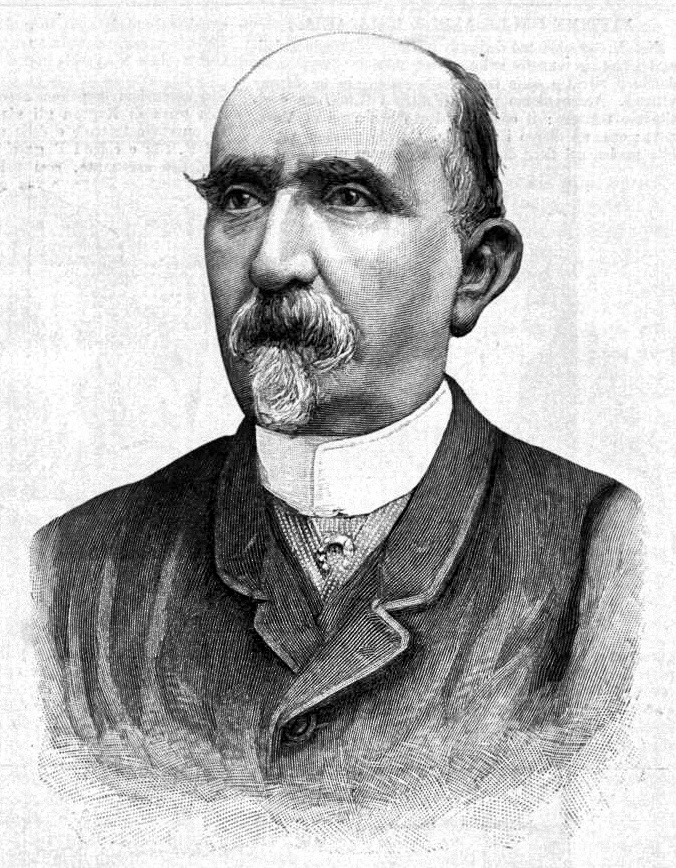
Carlo Collodi

- July 4
  - Stephen Foster, American songwriter, poet (d. 1864)
  - Green Clay Smith, American temperance movement leader (d. 1895)
- July 8 – Benjamin Grierson, American Civil War general (d. 1911)
- July 31 – William S. Clark, American chemist, 3rd President of the Massachusetts Agricultural College (d. 1886)
- August 7 – August Ahlqvist, Finnish professor, poet, scholar of the Finno-Ugric languages, author, and literary critic (d. 1889)
- August 11 – Andrew Jackson Davis, American spiritualist (d. 1910)
- August 21 – Carl Gegenbaur, German anatomist, professor (d. 1903)
- September 8 – Sir James Corry, 1st Baronet, British politician (d. 1891)
- September 13 – Zeng Laishun, Chinese interpreter and educator (d. 1895)
- September 17 – Bernhard Riemann, German mathematician (d. 1866)
- October 8 – Emily Blackwell, American physician (d. 1910)
- October 24 – Léopold Victor Delisle, French medievalist and Administrator General of the Bibliothèque Nationale
- November 10 – Jacob Hamburger, German rabbi and author (d. 1911)
- November 24 – Carlo Collodi, Italian writer (d. 1890)
- November 27 – Jonathan Young, United States Navy commodore (d. 1885)
- December 3 – George B. McClellan, American general, politician (d. 1885)
- December 8 – John Brown, Scottish personal servant and favourite of Queen Victoria (d. 1883)

=== Approximate date ===
- Cetshwayo kaMpande, Zulu king (d. 1884)
- Ellen Morton Littlejohn, American quilter (d. 1899)

1827

=== January–June ===
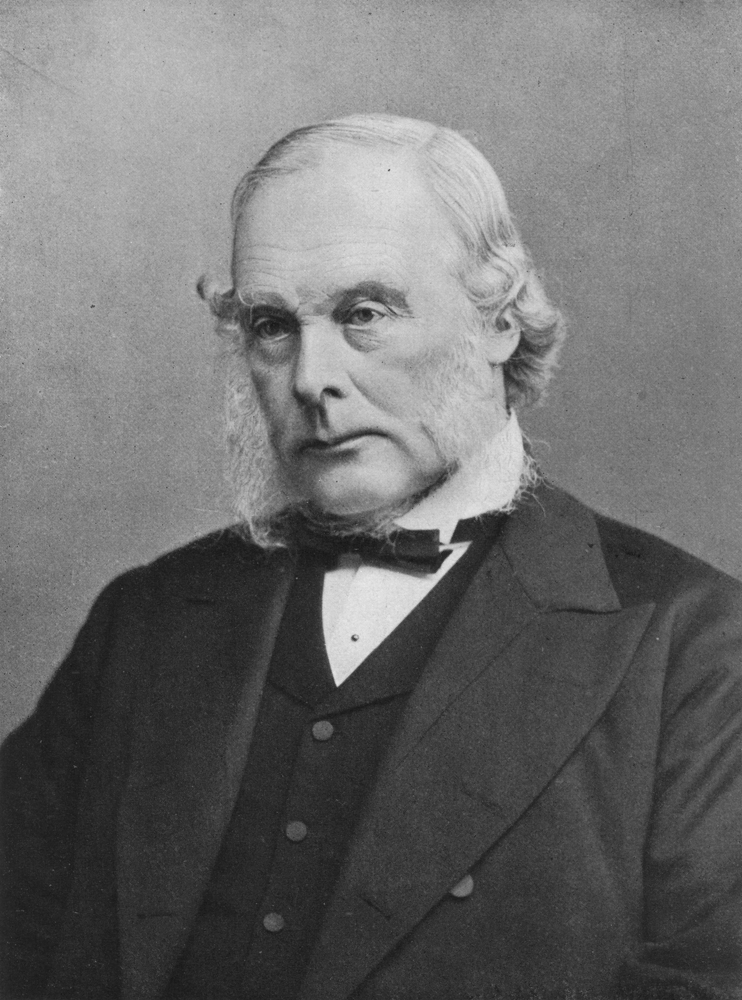
Joseph Lister

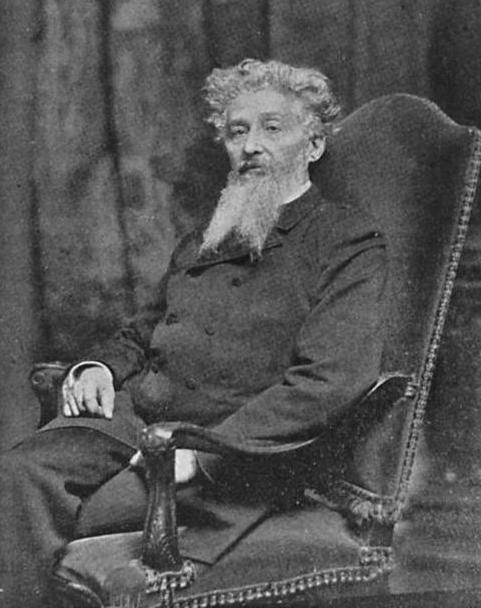
Ramón Emeterio Betances

- January 7 – Sir Sandford Fleming, Scottish-Canadian engineer, inventor (d. 1915)
- January 10 – Amanda Cajander, Finnish medical reformer (d. 1871)
- January 28 – Jean Antoine Villemin, French physician (d. 1892)
- February 17 – Elisabeth Blomqvist, Swedish-Finnish educator, feminist (d. 1901)
- March 7 – John Hall Gladstone, English chemist (d. 1902)
- March 8 – Wilhelm Bleek, German linguist (d. 1875)
- March 25 – Stephen Luce, American admiral (d. 1917)
- April 2 – William Holman Hunt, British Pre-Raphaelite painter (d. 1910)
- April 5 – Joseph Lister, English surgeon, medical pioneer (d. 1912)
- April 8 – Ramón Emeterio Betances, Puerto Rican politician, medical doctor and diplomat (d. 1898)
- May 11 – Jean-Baptiste Carpeaux, French sculptor, painter (d. 1875)
- May 19 – Paul-Armand Challemel-Lacour, French statesman (d. 1896)
- May 21 – William P. Sprague, American politician from Ohio (d. 1899)
- May 27 – Samuel F. Miller, American politician (d. 1892)
- May 31 – Frederic Thesiger, 2nd Baron Chelmsford, British general (d. 1905)
- June 11 – Natalie Zahle, Danish educator, women's rights activist (d. 1913)
- June 12 – Johanna Spyri, Swiss author (d. 1901)
- June 13 – Alberto Henschel, German-Brazilian photographer, businessman (d. 1882)
- June 24 – Louis Brière de l'Isle, French general (d. 1897)
- June 26 – Amédée Courbet, French admiral (d. 1885)

=== July–December ===
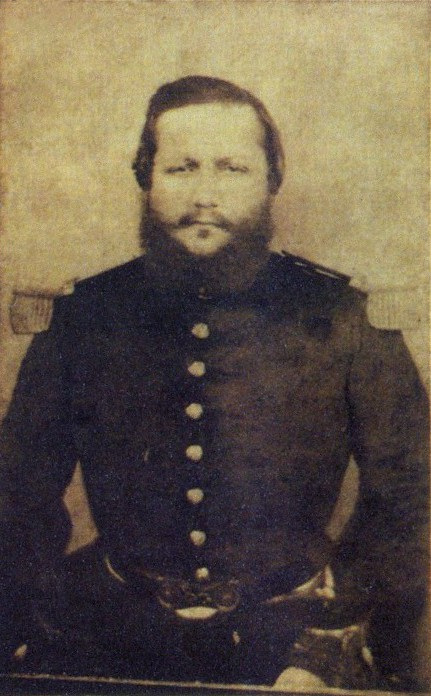
Francisco Solano López

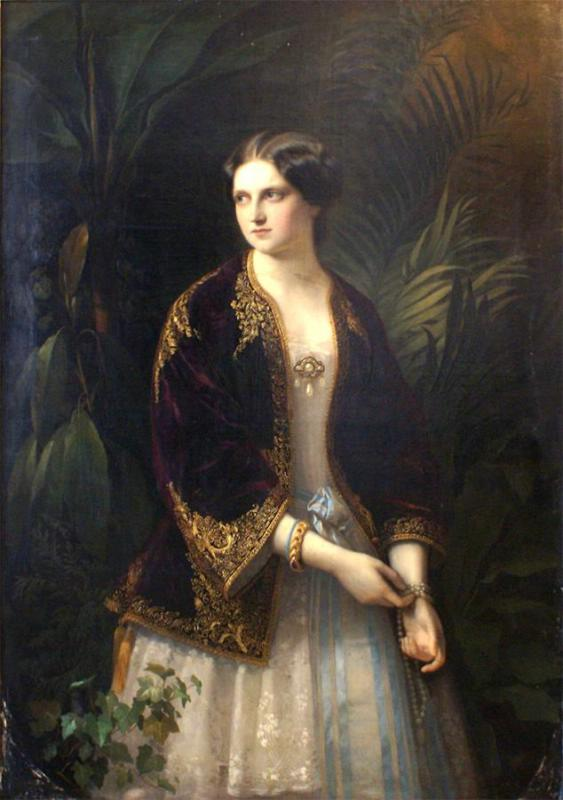
Grand Duchess Catherine Mikhailovna of Russia

Ellen G. White

- July 17 – Sir Frederick Augustus Abel, British chemist (d. 1902)
- July 18 – Mangal Pandey, Indian soldier (d. 1857)
- July 24 – Francisco Solano López, President of Paraguay (d. 1870)
- August 5 – Deodoro da Fonseca, 1st President of Brazil (d. 1892)
- August 23 – Lord John Hay, British admiral and politician (d. 1916)
- August 28 – Grand Duchess Catherine Mikhailovna of Russia, granddaughter of Tsar Paul I (d. 1894)
- September 3 – John Drew Sr., Irish-American stage actor, manager (d. 1862)
- September 27 – Georgiana Archer, German (originally Scottish) women's rights activist and educator (d. 1882)
- September 30 – Ellis H. Roberts, American politician (d. 1918)
- October 12 – Josiah Parsons Cooke, American chemist (d. 1894)
- October 16 – Arnold Böcklin, Swiss painter (d. 1901)
- October 25 – Marcellin Berthelot, French chemist (d. 1907)
- October 29 – Antonio Borrero, 10th President of Ecuador (d. 1911)
- November 1 – Friedrich Haase, German actor (d. 1911)
- November 7 – Antti Ahlström, Finnish industrialist (d. 1896)
- November 18 – Mehmed Ali Pasha, Prussian-born Ottoman military leader (d. 1878)
- November 26 – Ellen G. White, American religious leader, cofounder of the Seventh-day Adventist Church (d. 1915)
- November 29 – William Crichton, Scottish engineer and shipbuilder (d. 1889)
- December 3
  - Jain Acharya Rajendrasuri, Indian religious reformer (d. 1906)
  - Lombe Atthill, Northern Irish obstetrician and gynaecologist (d. 1910)
- December 17 – Baron Alexander Wassilko von Serecki, Governor of the Duchy of Bucovina, member of the Herrenhaus (d. 1893)
- December 23 – Wilhelm von Tegetthoff, Austrian admiral (d. 1871)
- December 27 – Stanisław Mieroszewski, Polish-born politician, writer, historian and member of the Imperial Council of Austria (d. 1900)

=== Undated ===
- Wazir Beg, Indian Semitic scholar and Presbyterian minister (d. 1885)

1828

=== January–June ===
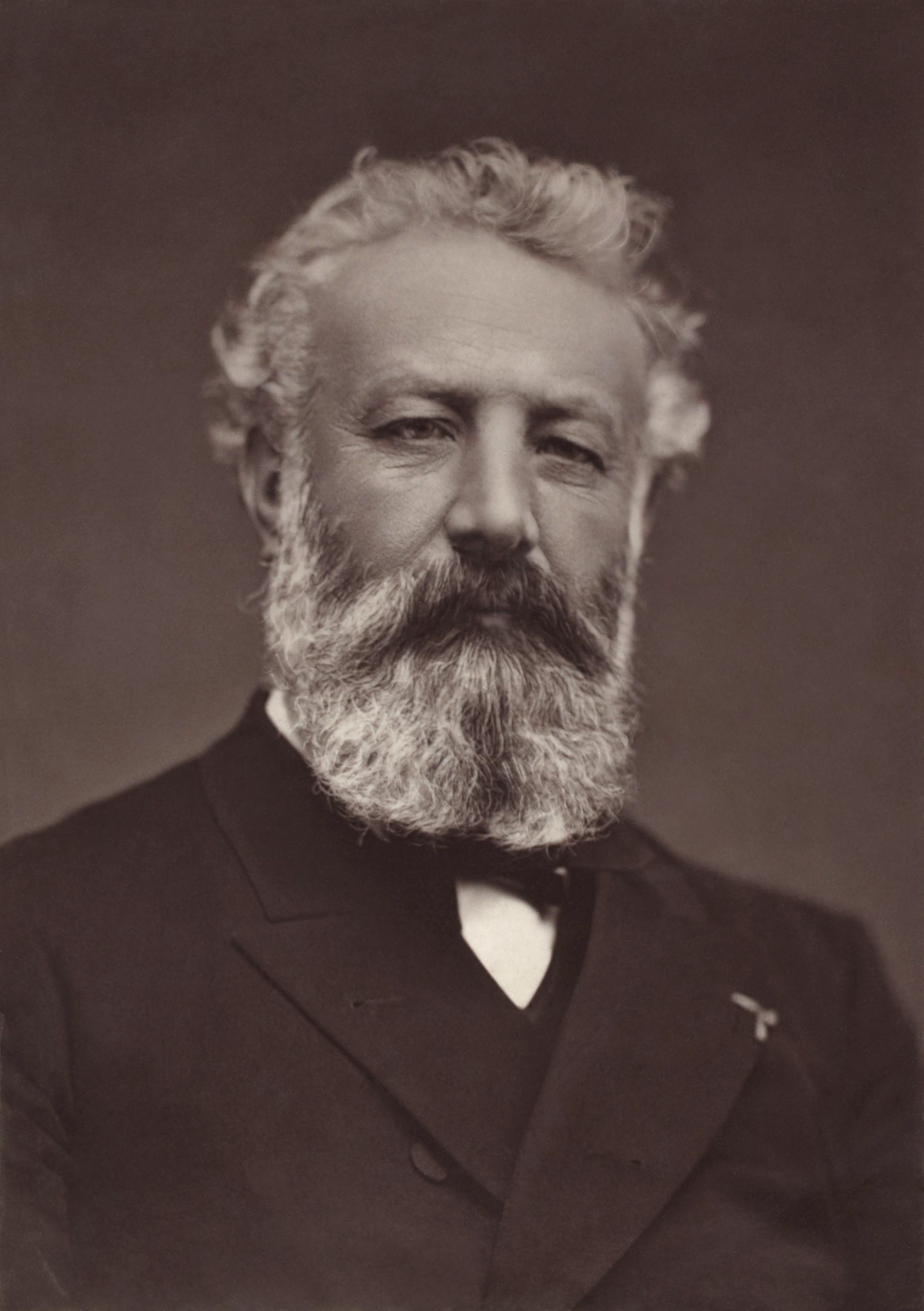
Jules Verne

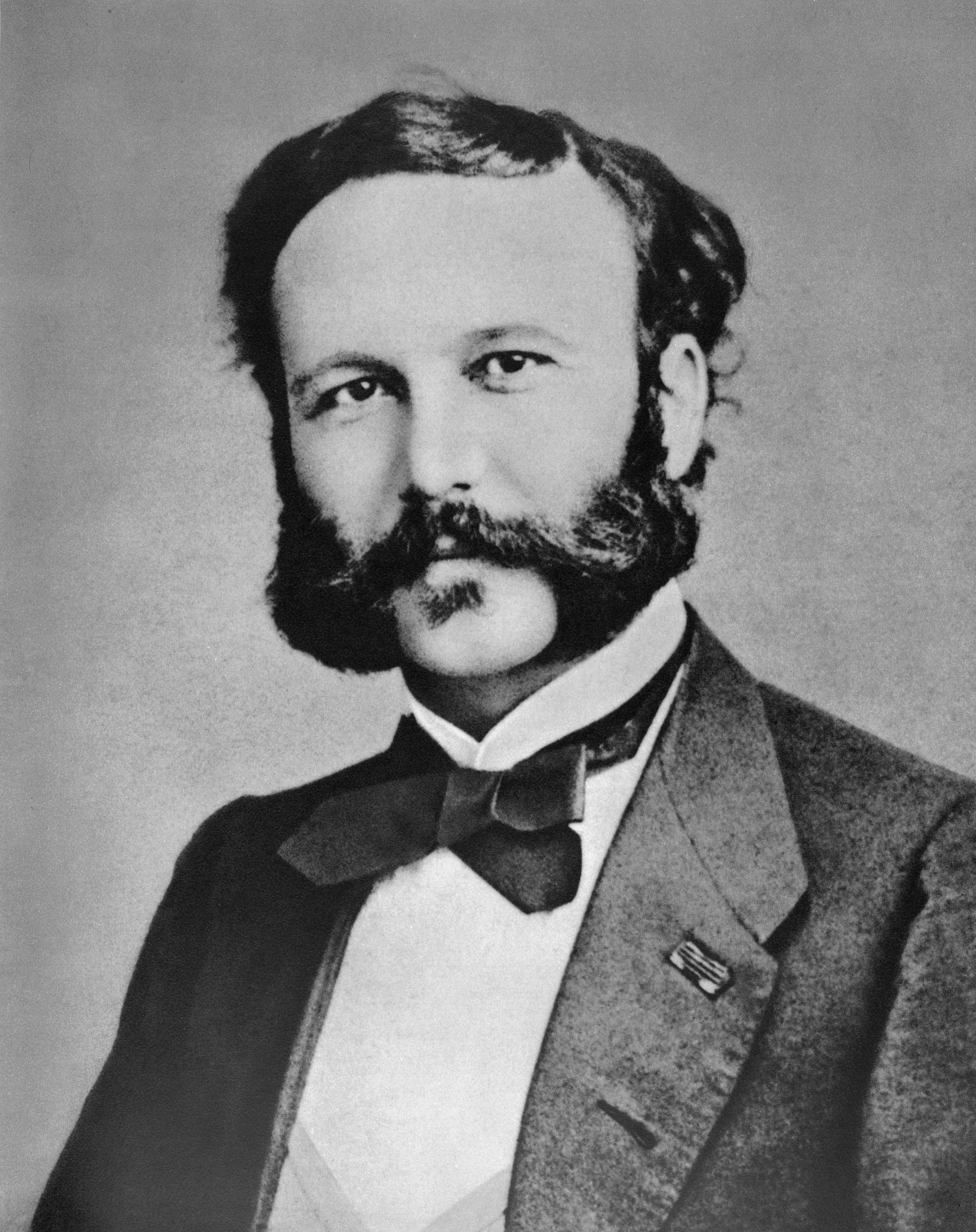
Jean Henri Dunant

- January 17 – Alexandru Cernat, Moldavian-born Romanian general and politician (d. 1893)
- January 22 – Dora d'Istria, Romanian-Albanian writer (d. 1888)
- January 23 – Saigō Takamori, Japanese samurai (d. 1877)
- February 8 – Jules Verne, French science fiction author (d. 1905)
- March 13 – Sébastien Lespès, French admiral (d. 1897)
- March 17 – Patrick Cleburne, Irish soldier, Confederate general (d. 1864)
- March 18 – Sir Randal Cremer, English politician, pacifist, recipient of the Nobel Peace Prize (d. 1908)
- March 20 – Henrik Ibsen, Norwegian playwright (d. 1906)
- March 24 – Horace Gray, Associate Justice of the Supreme Court of the United States (d. 1902)
- March 25 – George Montgomery White, American politician (d. 1860)
- April 17 – Johanna Mestorf, German prehistoric archaeologist (d. 1909)
- April 20 – Josephine Butler, British social reformer (d. 1906)
- April 26 – Martha Finley, American teacher, author (d. 1909)
- April 29 – Étienne Stéphane Tarnier, French obstetrician, inventor (d. 1897)
- May 8
  - Henry Dunant, Swiss founder of the Red Cross, recipient of the Nobel Peace Prize (d. 1910)
  - Charbel Makhluf, Lebanese monk canonized in 1977 by Pope Paul VI (d. 1898)
- May 12 – Dante Gabriel Rossetti, English poet, painter (d. 1882)
- June 21 – Ferdinand André Fouqué, French geologist, petrologist (d. 1904)
- June 28 – Alexandre Franquet, French admiral (d. 1907)

=== July–December ===
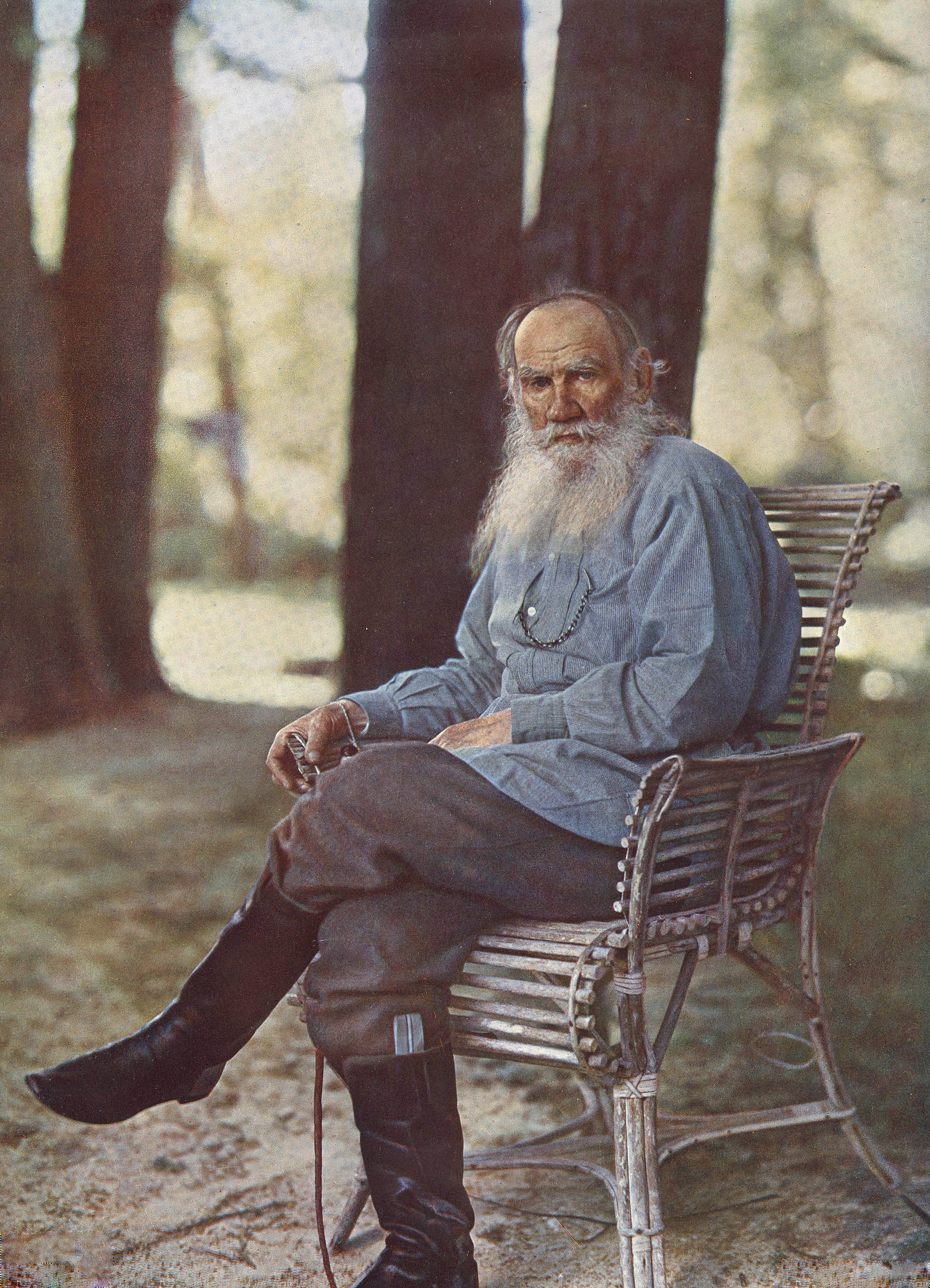
Leo Tolstoy

- July 9 – Luigi Oreglia di Santo Stefano, Italian Catholic churchman (d. 1913)
- July 23 – Sir Jonathan Hutchinson, English physician (d. 1913)
- July 28 – Iosif Gurko, Russian field marshal (d. 1901)
- July 31 – Ignacio de Veintemilla, 11th President of Ecuador (d. 1908)
- August 6 – Andrew Taylor Still, American father of osteopathy (d. 1917)
- August 17 – Maria Deraismes, French feminist (d. 1894)
- August 25 – Jane Stanford, American philanthropist, co-founder of Stanford University, first lady of California (d. 1905)
- August 28 – William A. Hammond, American military physician, neurologist and 11th Surgeon General of the United States Army (1862–1864) (d. 1900)
- September 1 – Anthony Hoskins, British admiral (d. 1901)
- September 8
  - Joshua Chamberlain, Governor of Maine, President of Bowdoin College in Brunswick, Maine (d. 1914)
  - Clarence Cook, American art critic, writer (d. 1900)
- September 9 (O.S.)/August 28 (N.S.) – Leo Tolstoy, Russian writer (d. 1910)
- October 2 – Charles Floquet, Prime Minister of France (d. 1896)
- October 20 – Horatio Spafford, American author of the hymn It Is Well with My Soul (d. 1888)
- October 31 – Sir Joseph Swan, English physicist, chemist (d. 1914)
- November 17 – Milton Wright, American bishop, father of aviation pioneers the Wright brothers (d. 1917)
- November 19 – Rani Lakshmibai, queen of the Maratha-ruled princely Indian state of Jhansi (d. 1858)
- November 24 – Henry Lomb, German-American optician, co-founder of Bausch & Lomb (d. 1908)
- November 26 – René Goblet, Prime Minister of France (d. 1905)
- December 8 – Clinton B. Fisk, American temperance movement leader (d. 1890)

=== Date unknown ===
- William Robert Woodman, British co-founder of the Hermetic Order of the Golden Dawn (d. 1891)
- Ely S. Parker, Seneca lieutenant colonel and first Native Commissioner of Indian Affairs

1829

=== January ===
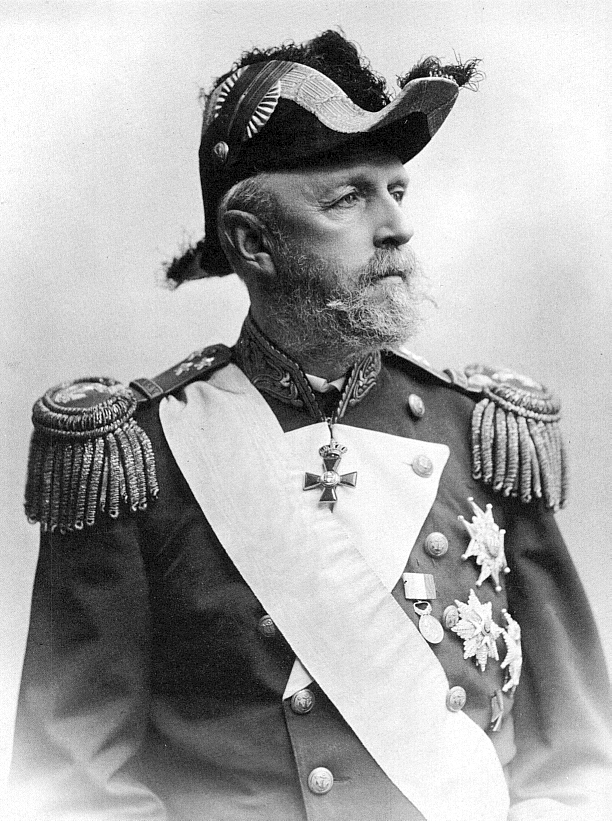
King Oscar II of Sweden

- January 1 – Tommaso Salvini, Italian actor (d. 1915)
- January 3 – Konrad Duden, German philologist (d. 1911)
- January 10 – Epameinondas Deligeorgis, Prime Minister of Greece (d. 1879)
- January 17 – Catherine Booth, English Mother of The Salvation Army (d. 1890)
- January 21 – King Oscar II of Sweden and Norway (d. 1907)
- January 27 – Isaac Roberts, Welsh astronomer (d. 1904).

=== February ===
- February 2
  - Alfred Brehm, German zoologist (d. 1884)
  - William Stanley, British inventor, engineer (d. 1909)
- February 22 – Princess Sumiko, Japanese princess (d. 1881)
- February 26 – Levi Strauss, American clothing designer (d. 1902).

=== March ===
- March 2 – Carl Schurz, German revolutionary, American statesman (d. 1906)
- March 14 – Pierre-Hector Coullié, Cardinal-Archbishop of Lyon (d. 1912)
- March 16 – George M. Robeson, American politician (d. 1897)
- March 19 – Carl Frederik Tietgen, Danish financier, industrialist (d. 1901).

=== April ===
- April 6 – Anna Haslam, Irish women's rights activist, suffragist (d. 1922)
- April 10 – William Booth, British founder of The Salvation Army (d. 1912).

=== May ===
- May 8 – Louis Moreau Gottschalk, American composer, pianist (d. 1869).

=== June ===
- June 4 – Allan Octavian Hume, British civil servant (d. 1912)
- June 5 – George Stephen, 1st Baron Mount Stephen, Scottish-Canadian businessman, philanthropist (d. 1921)
- June 6 – Shusaku Honinbo, Japanese Go player (d. 1862)
- June 8 – Sir John Everett Millais, British Pre-Raphaelite painter (d. 1896)
- June 14 – Bernard Petitjean, French Catholic missionary to Japan (d. 1884)
- June 16 – Geronimo, indigenous American (Apache) leader (d. 1909).

=== July ===
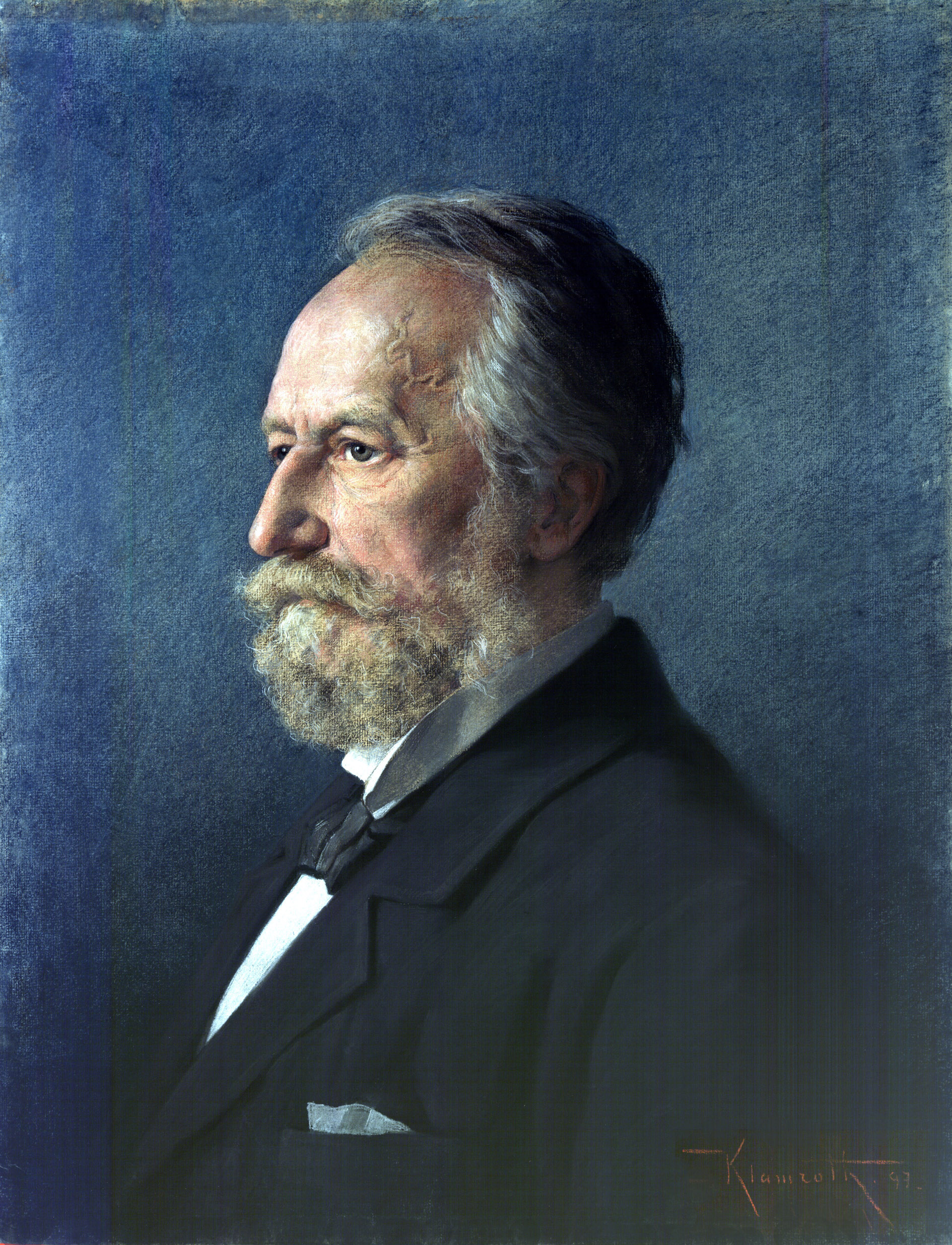
Adolf Eugen Fick

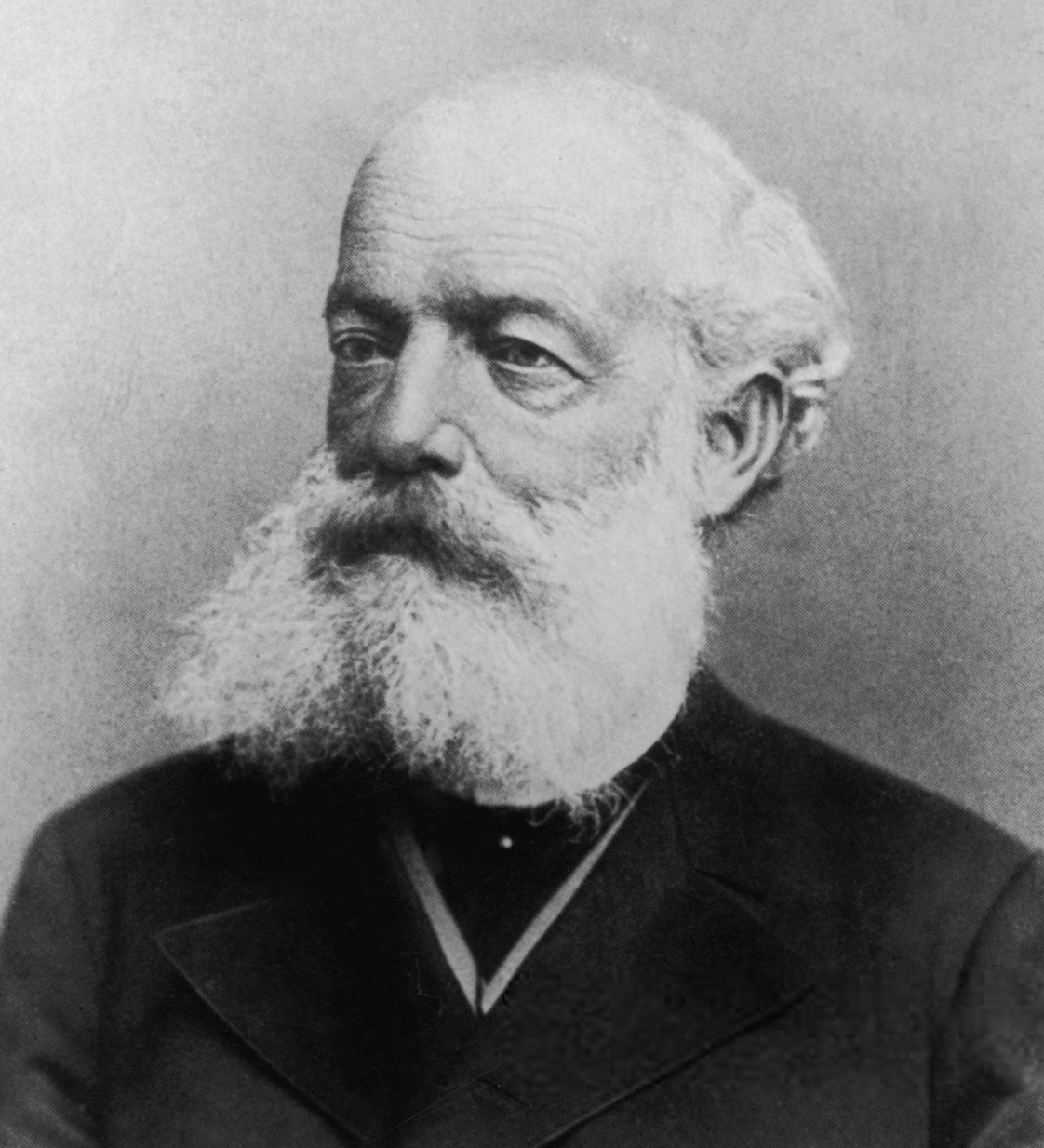
August Kekulé

- July 2 – Martis Karin Ersdotter, Swedish businesswoman (died 1902)
- July 14 – Edward White Benson, Archbishop of Canterbury (d. 1896)
- July 26 – Auguste Beernaert, Belgian statesman, recipient of the Nobel Peace Prize (d. 1912).

=== August ===
- August 24 – Emanuella Carlbeck, Swedish social reformer (d. 1901).

=== September ===
- September 3 – Adolf Eugen Fick, German-born physician, physiologist (d. 1901)
- September 7 – August Kekulé, German chemist (d. 1896)
- September 12 – Anselm Feuerbach, German painter (d. 1880).

=== October ===
- October 1 – Sidney Hill, English philanthropist (d. 1908)
- October 5 – Chester A. Arthur, 21st President of the United States (d. 1886)
- October 13 – Jules Pellechet, French architect (d. 1903)
- October 15 – Asaph Hall, American astronomer (d. 1907).

=== November ===
- November 9 – Sir Peter Lumsden, British general in the Indian army (d. 1918)
- November 10 – Newton Knight, American farmer, soldier and Southern Unionist in Mississippi and Civil War guerrilla (d. 1922)
- November 28 – Anton Rubinstein, Russian pianist, composer (d. 1894).

=== December ===
- December 30 – Abel Smith MP, is born in London, England.

== Deaths ==
1820

=== January–June ===
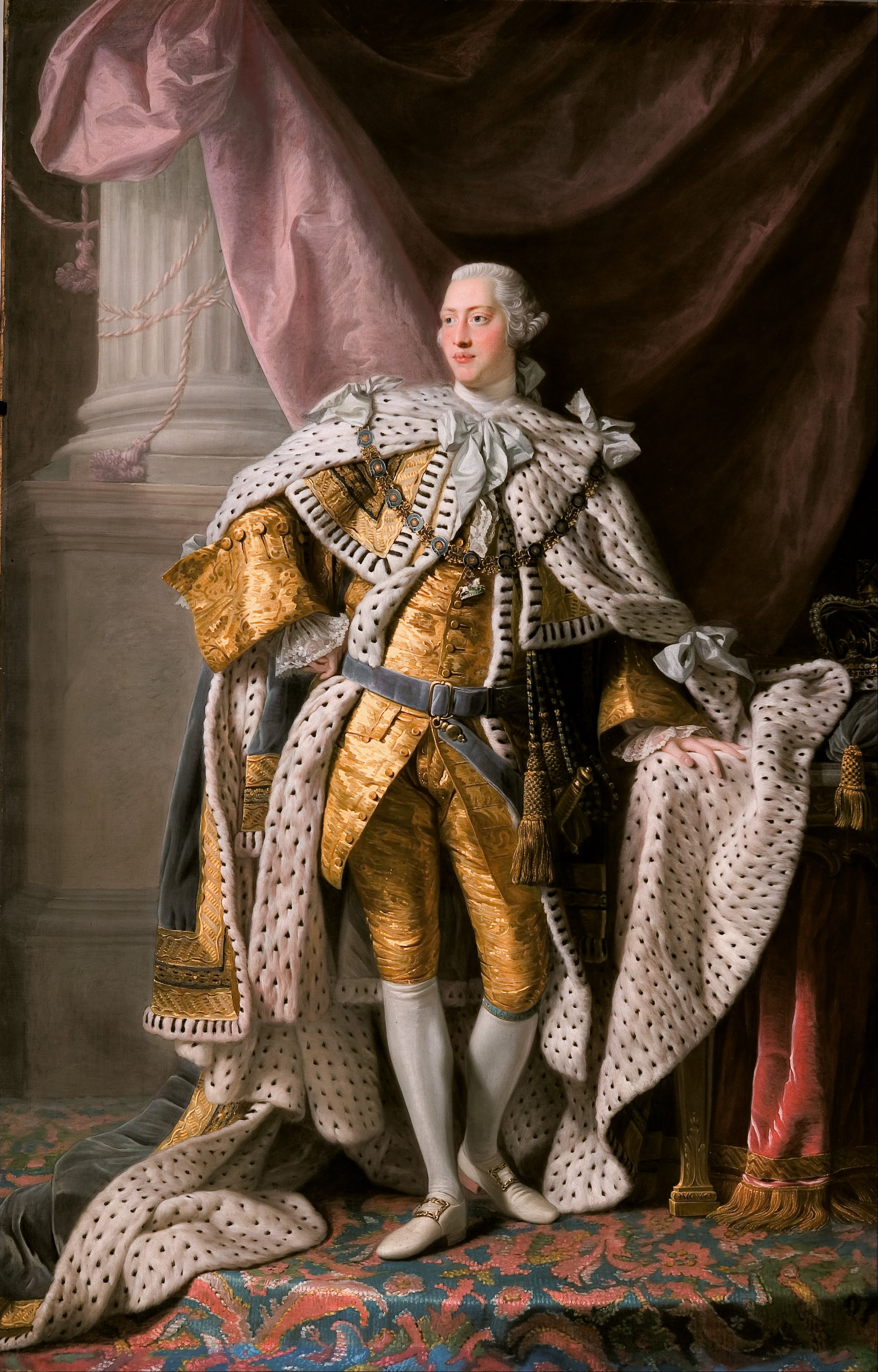
King George III

- January 17 – Daniel Albert Wyttenbach, Swiss-born academic (b. 1746)
- January 23 – Prince Edward, Duke of Kent and Strathearn, member of British Royal Family and father of Queen Victoria (b. 1767)
- January 29 – King George III of the United Kingdom (b. 1738)
- February 5 – William Drennan, Irish physician, poet and radical politician (b. 1754)
- February 11 – Karl von Fischer, German architect (b. 1782)
- February 14 – Charles Ferdinand, Duke of Berry, French noble (stabbed) (b. 1778)
- March 11 – Benjamin West, Anglo-American painter of historical scenes (b. 1738)
- March 22 – Stephen Decatur, American sailor (b. 1779)
- April 8 – Thomas Douglas, 5th Earl of Selkirk, Scottish-born philanthropist (b. 1771)
- April 20 – James Morris III, Continental Army officer from Connecticut (b. 1752)
- May 30 – William Bradley, Britain's tallest ever man (b. 1787)
- June 6 – Henry Grattan, Irish politician (b. 1746)
- June 9 – Wilhelmina of Prussia, Princess of Orange (b. 1751)
- June 19 – Sir Joseph Banks, English naturalist and botanist (b. 1743)
- June 20 – Manuel Belgrano, Argentine politician, general in the Independence War (b. 1770)

=== July–December ===
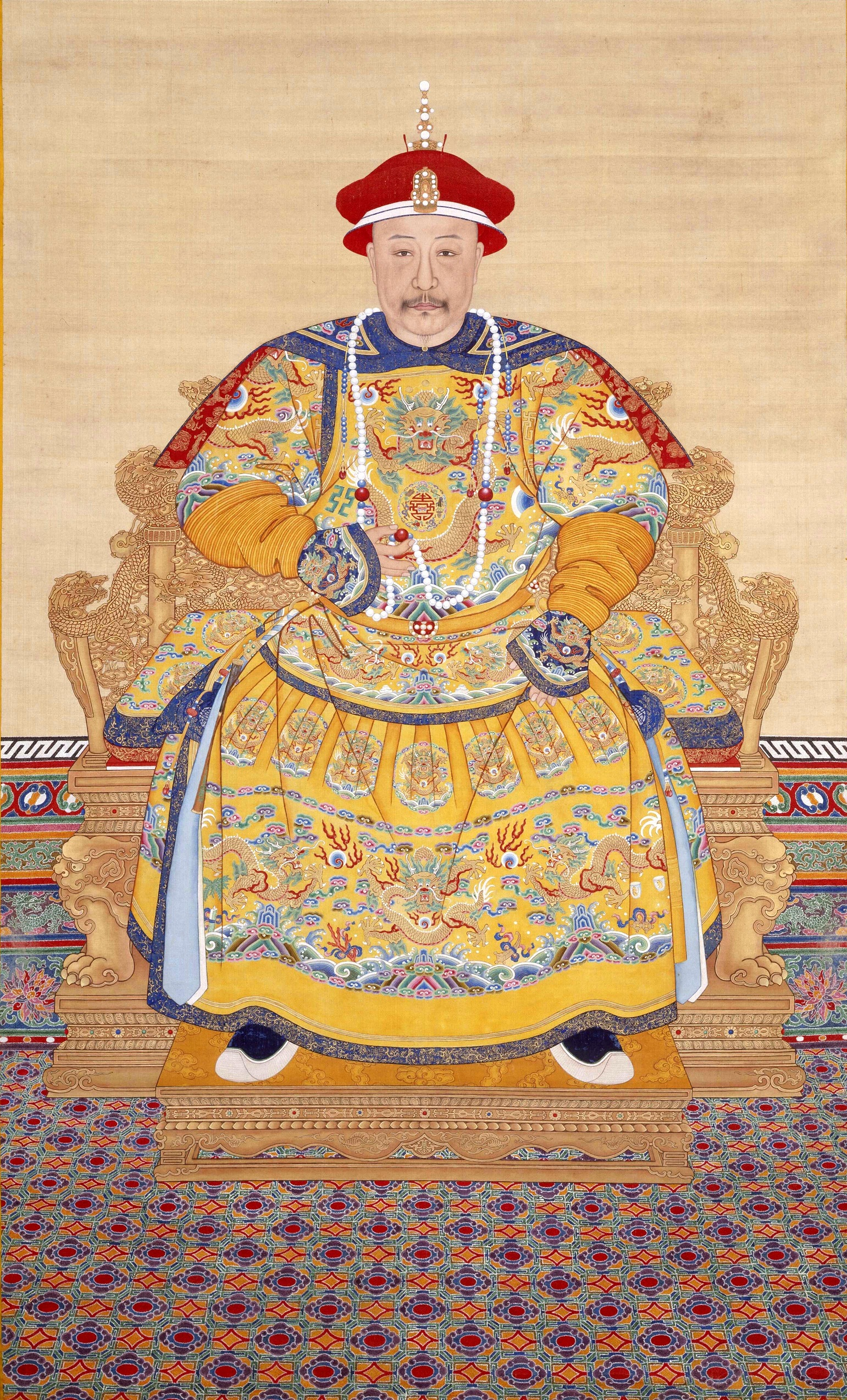
Jiaqing Emperor

- July 10 – William Wyatt Bibb, first Governor of Alabama (b. 1781)
- August 6 – Antonín Vranický, Bohemian violinist and composer (b. 1761)
- August 9 – Anders Sparrman, Swedish naturalist (b. 1748)
- August 12 – Manuel Lisa, Spanish-born American fur trader (b. 1772)
- September 2 – Jiaqing Emperor, Chinese emperor (b. 1760)
- September 3 – Benjamin Latrobe, Anglo-American architect (b. 1764)
- September 4 – Timothy Brown, English banker, merchant and radical (b. 1743/1744)
- September 16 – Nguyễn Du, Vietnamese poet (b. 1766)
- September 18 – Mariana Joaquina Pereira Coutinho, Portuguese courtier, salonnière (b. 1748)
- September 26 – Daniel Boone, American pioneer (b. 1734)
- September 28 – Pedro Andrés del Alcázar, Spanish and later Chilean Army officer and war hero (b. 1752)
- September 29 – Barthelemy Lafon, Creole architect and smuggler (b. 1769)
- October 4 - Claudine Picardet, French chemist, mineralogist, meteorologist and scientific translator (b. 1735)
- October 8 – Henri Christophe, Haitian revolutionary leader (suicide) (b. 1767)
- October 11 – James Keir, Scottish geologist, chemist and industrialist (b. 1735)
- October 15 – Karl Philipp Fürst zu Schwarzenberg, Austrian field marshal (b. 1771)
- November 1 – Pierre Martin, French admiral (b. 1752)
- November 8 – Lavinia Stoddard, American poet and school founder (b. 1787)
- December 25 – Joseph Fouché, French statesman (b. 1759)
- December 29 – Princess Pauline of Anhalt-Bernburg, German regent and social reformer (b. 1769)

1821

=== January–June ===
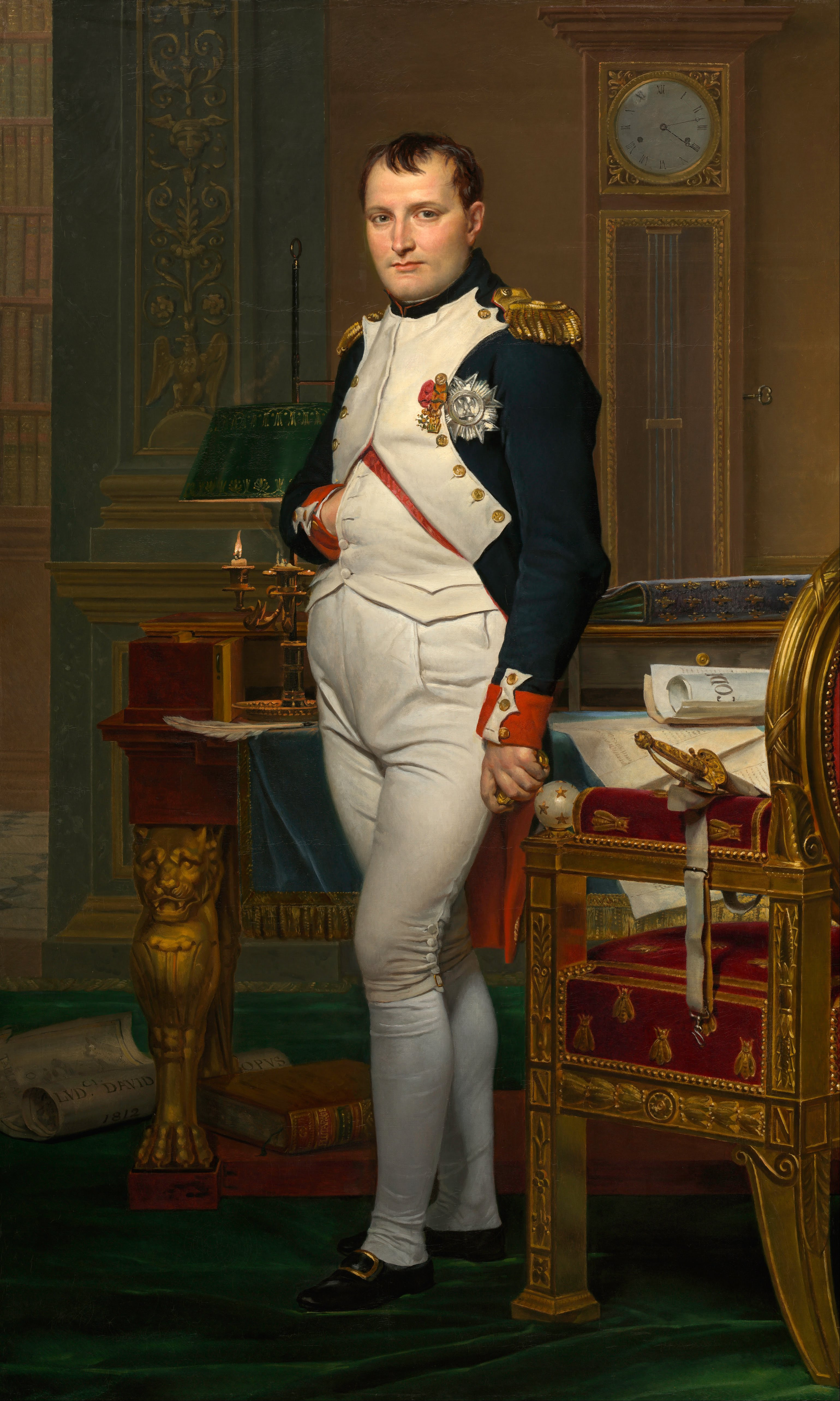
Napoleon Bonaparte

- January 4 – Elizabeth Ann Seton, American saint (b. 1774)
- January 5 – Carlo Porta, Milanese poet (b. 1775)
- January 19 – Alexandru Suţu, prince of Moldavia (b. 1758)
- February 23 – John Keats, British poet (b. 1795)
- February 26 – Joseph de Maistre, French-Savoyard philosopher (b. 1753)
- March 4 – Princess Elizabeth of Clarence, daughter of William, Duke of Clarence (later King William IV) (b. 1820)
- March 13 – John Hunter, second Governor of New South Wales (b. 1737)
- April 10 – Patriarch Gregory V of Constantinople (b. 1746)
- April 20 – Franz Karl Achard, German chemist, physicist and biologist (b. 1753)
- April 23 – Pierre de Ruel, marquis de Beurnonville, French general (b. 1752)
- May 2 – Hester Thrale, Welsh diarist and friend of Dr Johnson (b. 1741)
- May 5 – Napoleon Bonaparte, French Emperor and general (b. 1769)
- May 19 – Camille Jordan, French politician (b. 1771)
- June 7 – Tudor Vladimirescu, Wallachian rebel leader (b. c. 1780)
- June 17 – Martín Miguel de Güemes, Argentine military leader (b. 1785)
- June 19 – Peter Ochs, Swiss politician (b. 1752)
- June 23 – Louise Marie Adélaïde de Bourbon-Penthièvre, Duchess of Orléans, heiress, wife of Philippe Égalité (b. 1753)
- June 30 – José Fernando de Abascal y Sousa, viceroy of Peru (b. 1743)

=== July–December ===
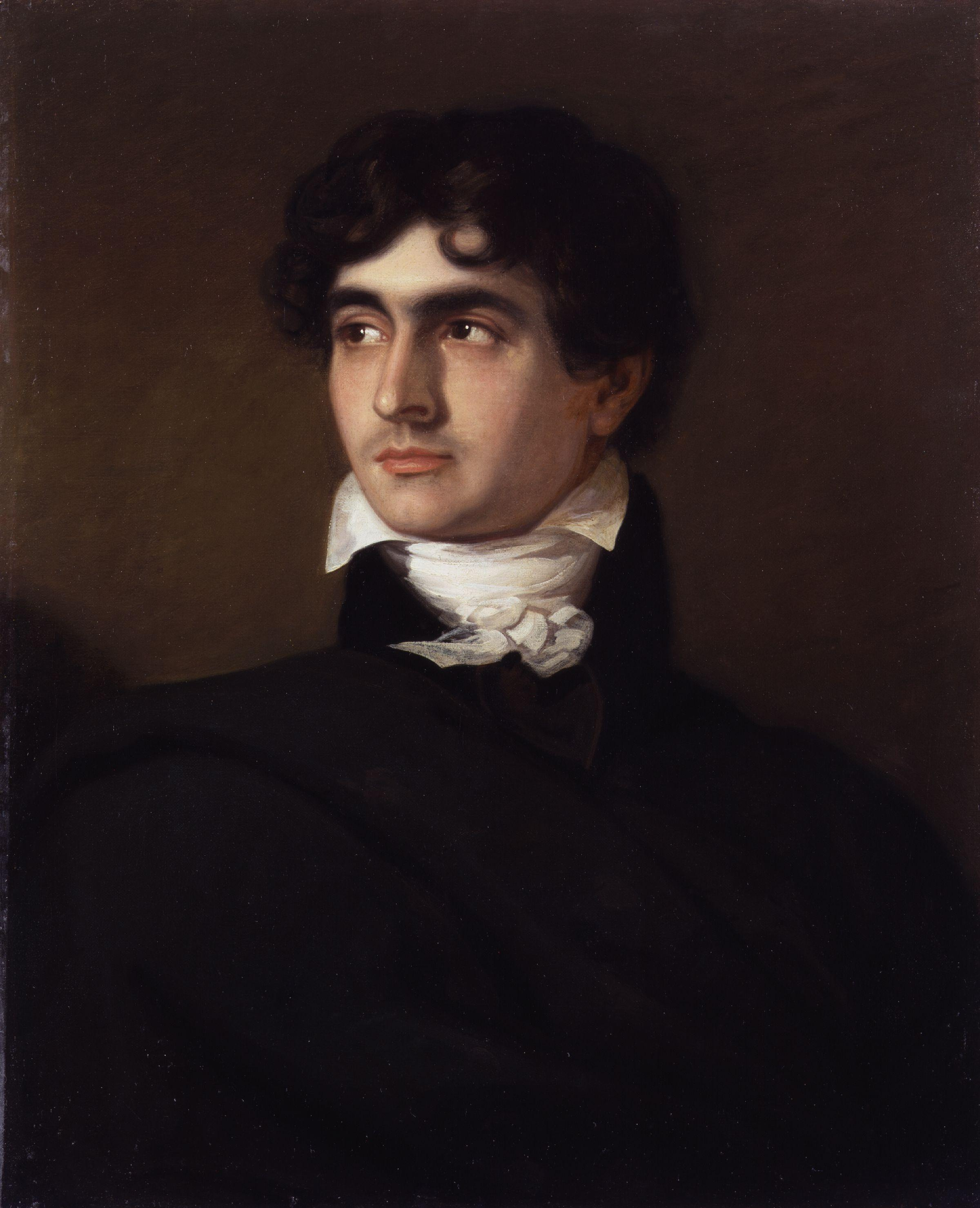
John William Polidori

- July 4 – Richard Cosway, English artist (b. 1742)
- July 14 – Pedro Juan Caballero, Paraguayan captain (b. 1786) (suicide)
- July 17 – Fulgencio Yegros, Paraguayan general and politician (b. 1780)
- August 7 – Caroline of Brunswick, Queen of the United Kingdom (b. 1768)
- August 20 – Dorothea von Medem, Latvian diploma, duchess of Courland (b. 1761)
- August 24 – John William Polidori, English physician, writer (b. 1795) (suicide)
- September 4 – José Miguel Carrera, Chilean general, founding father (b. 1785)
- September 10 – Johann Dominicus Fiorillo, German painter, art historian (b. 1748)
- September 14 – Heinrich Kuhl, German naturalist, zoologist (b. 1797)
- October 4 – Marie-Louise Lachapelle, French obstetrician (b. 1769)
- October 6 – Anders Jahan Retzius, Swedish chemist, botanist (b. 1742)
- October 8 – Juan O'Donojú, viceroy of New Spain (b. 1762)
- October 11 – John Ross Key, American judge, lawyer, father of songwriter Francis Scott Key (b. 1754)
- October 21 – Dorothea Ackermann, German actress (b. 1752)
- November 8 – Jean Rapp, French general (b. 1771)
- December 4 – John Henniker-Major, 2nd Baron Henniker, British politician (b. 1752)
- December 7 – King Pōmare II of Tahiti (b. 1782)
- December 12 – Phoebe Hessel, British female soldier (b. 1713)

1822

=== January–June ===
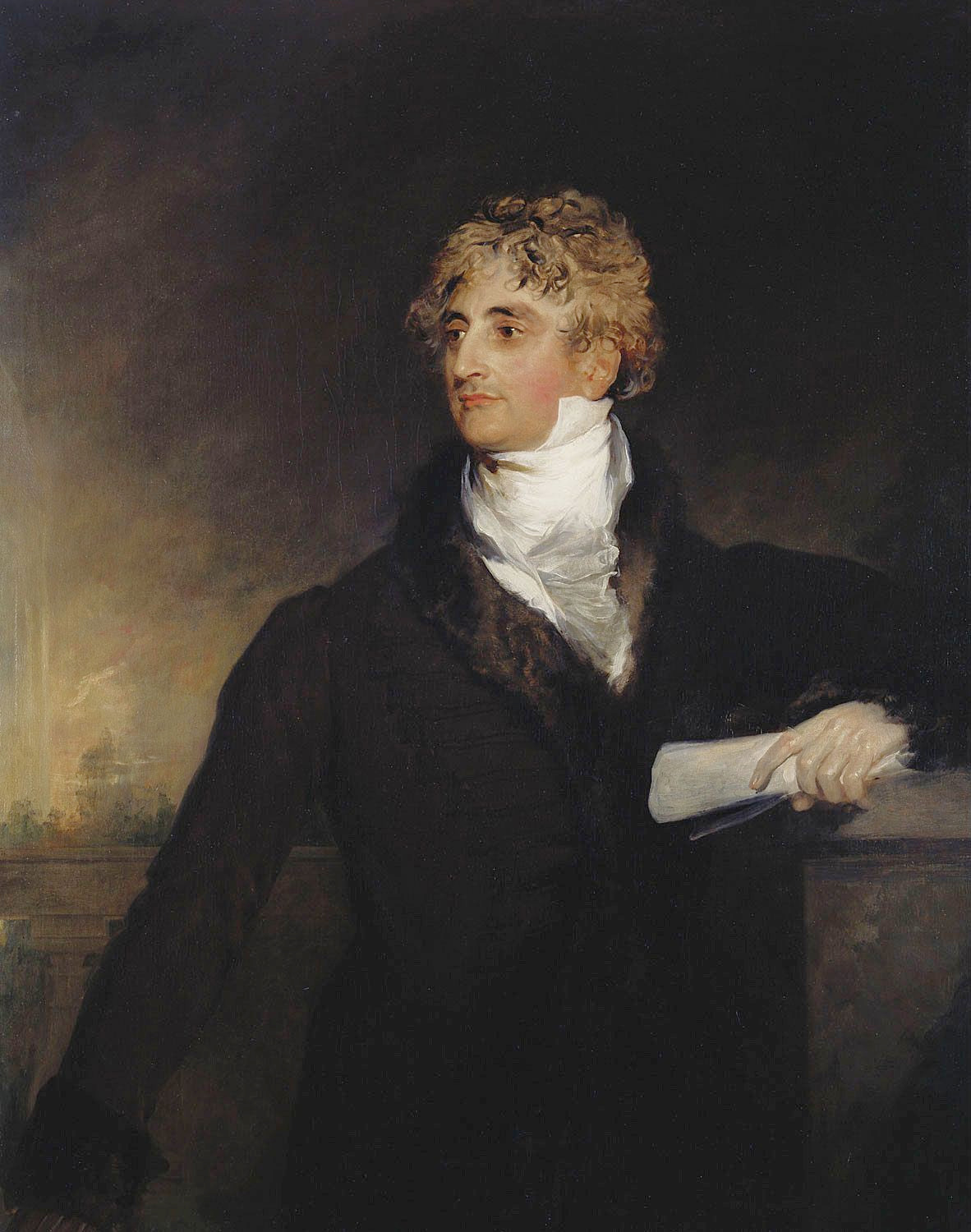
Duke of Richelieu.

- January 10 – Bathilde d'Orléans, French princess (b. 1750)
- January 16 – Elisabeth Berenberg, German banker (b. 1749)
- January 21 – Marie Aimée Lullin, Swiss entomologist (b. 1751)
- January 24 – Ali Pasha of Yanina, ruler of European Turkey (b. 1741)
- February 10 – Prince Albert of Saxony, Duke of Teschen (b. 1738)
- February 20 – John "Walking" Stewart, English traveller, philosopher (b. 1747)
- February 24 – Thomas Coutts, British banker (b. 1735)
- February 27 – John Borlase Warren, British admiral (b. 1753)
- March 1 – Jack Jouett, American politician (b. 1754)
- March 16 – Jeanne-Louise-Henriette Campan, French educator, lady in waiting (b. 1752)
- March 19 – Valentin Haüy, French educator, founder of the first school for the blind (b. 1745)
- April 14 – Edmund Butcher, English Unitarian minister (b. 1757)
- April 20 – Allegra Byron, illegitimate daughter of Lord Byron (b. 1817)
- May 8 – John Stark, American Revolutionary War general (b. 1728)
- May 17 – Armand-Emmanuel de Vignerot du Plessis, Duc de Richelieu, Prime Minister of France (b. 1766)
- May 27 – Augustus, Duke of Saxe-Gotha-Altenburg (b. 1772)
- June 3
  - Thomas Bulkeley, 7th Viscount Bulkeley, English aristocrat and politician (b. 1752)
  - René Just Haüy, French "father of modern crystallography" (b. 1743)
- June 15 – Horatio Walpole, 2nd Earl of Orford (b. 1752)
- June 25 – E. T. A. Hoffmann, German Romantic author (b. 1776)

=== July–December ===
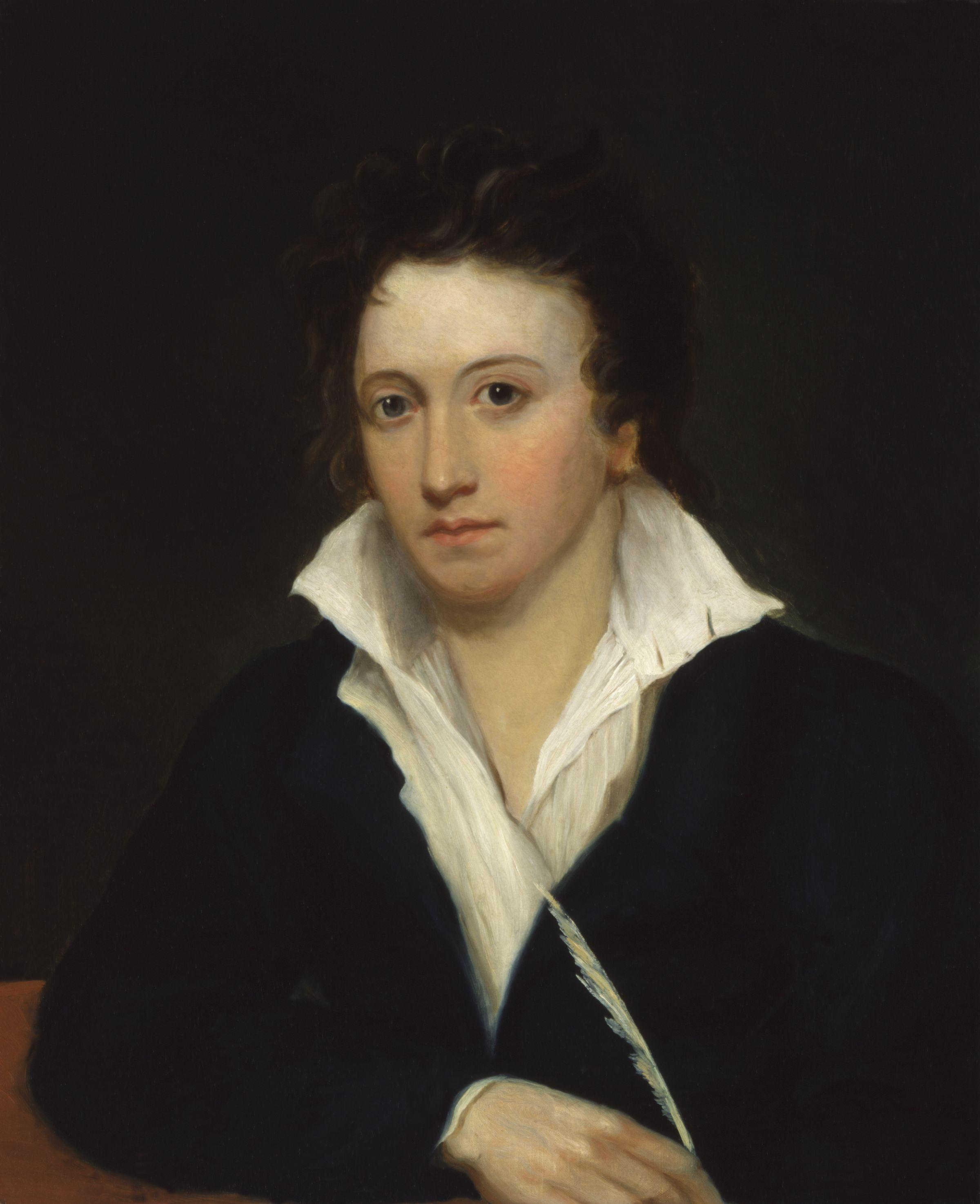
Percy Bysshe Shelley

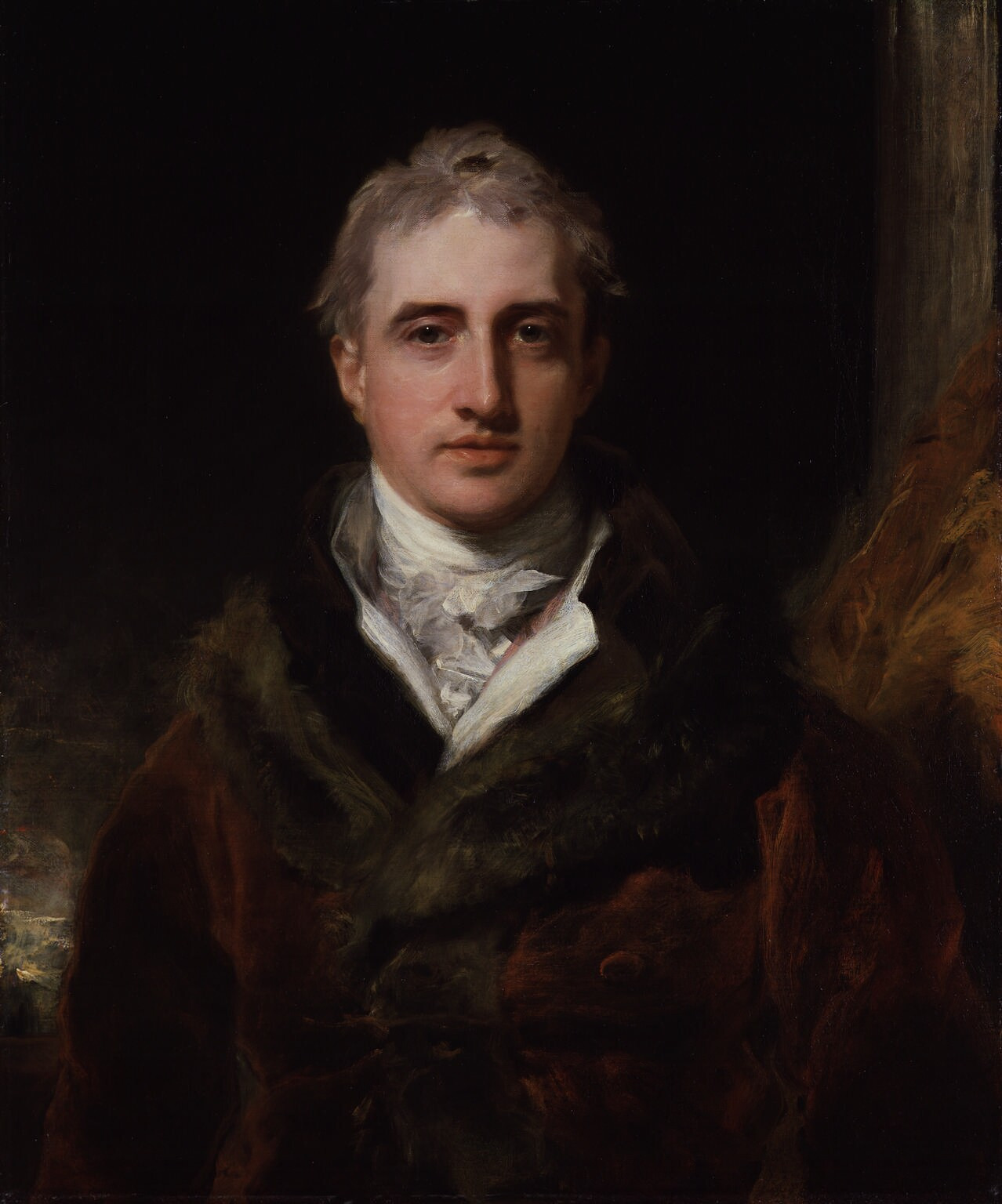
Robert Stewart, Viscount Castlereagh

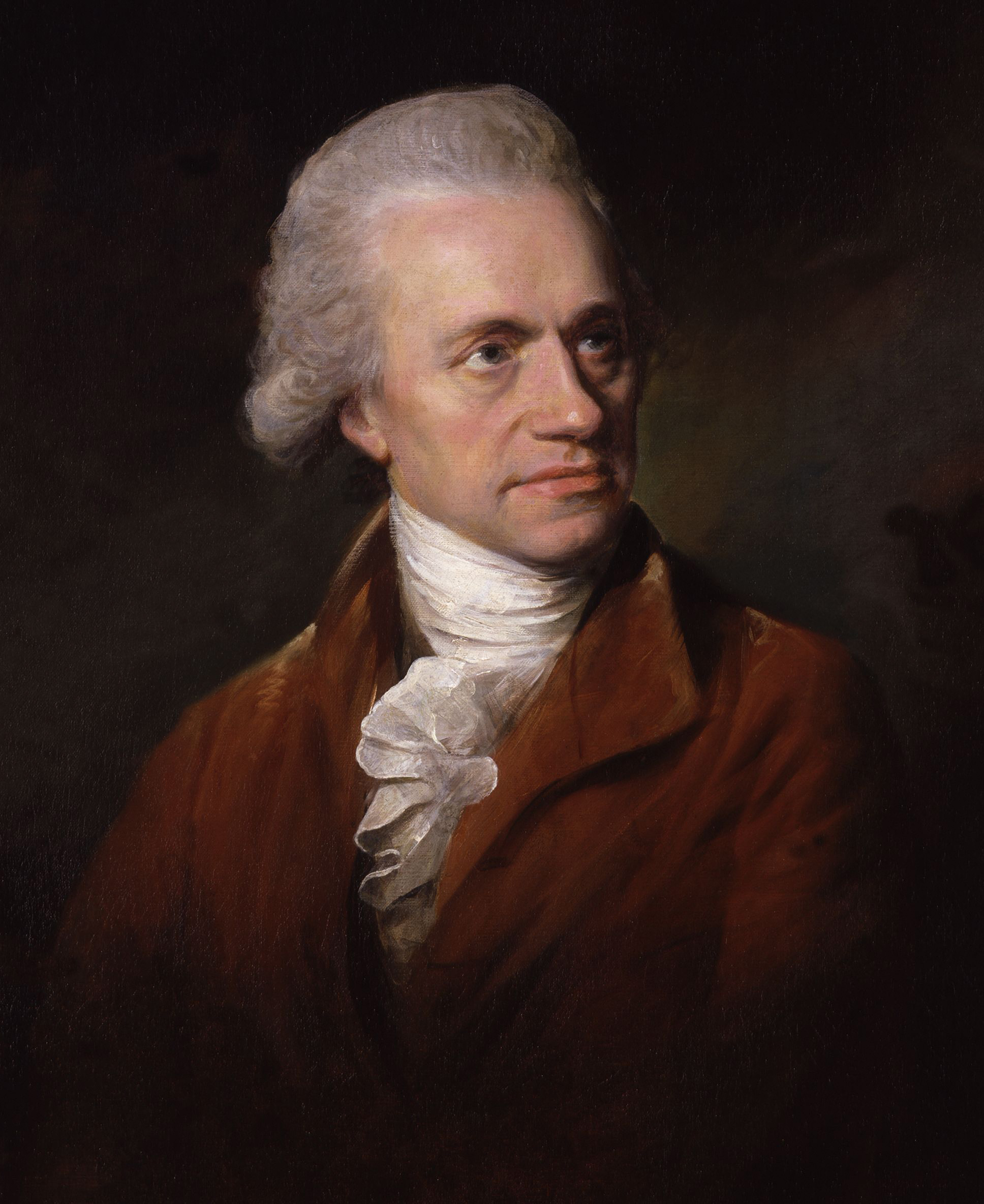
William Herschel

- July 8 – Percy Bysshe Shelley, British poet (b. 1792)
- July 15 – Manuel Torres, first Colombian ambassador to the United States (b. 1762)
- August 4 – Kristjan Jaak Peterson, Estonian poet (b. 1801)
- August 12 – Robert Stewart, Viscount Castlereagh, British foreign secretary (suicide) (b. 1769)
- August 25 – William Herschel, German-born British astronomer (b. 1738)
- September 2 – Félix Darfour, Haitian journalist (executed)
- September 8 – Sophie de Condorcet, politically active French salonist, feminist (b. 1764)
- October 13 – Antonio Canova, Italian sculptor (b. 1757)
- October 16 – Eva Marie Veigel, Austrian-born English ballet dancer, known as La Violette (b. 1724)
- October 25 – Sara Oust, Norwegian lay minister (b. 1778)
- October 26 – Mahmud Dramali Pasha, Ottoman vizier (b. c. 1780)
- October 31 – Jared Ingersoll, U.S. presidential candidate (b. 1749)
- November 6 – Claude Louis Berthollet, French chemist (b. 1748)
- November 24 – Zofia Potocka, Greek-Polish noble and agent (b. 1760)
- November 26 – Karl August von Hardenberg, Prussian politician (b. 1750)
- December 7 – John Aikin, English doctor and writer (b. 1747)
- December 17 – Giovanni Fabbroni, Italian scientist (b. 1752)

=== Date unknown ===
- Manuela Medina, Mexican national heroine (died of wounds) (b. 1780)

1823

=== January–June ===
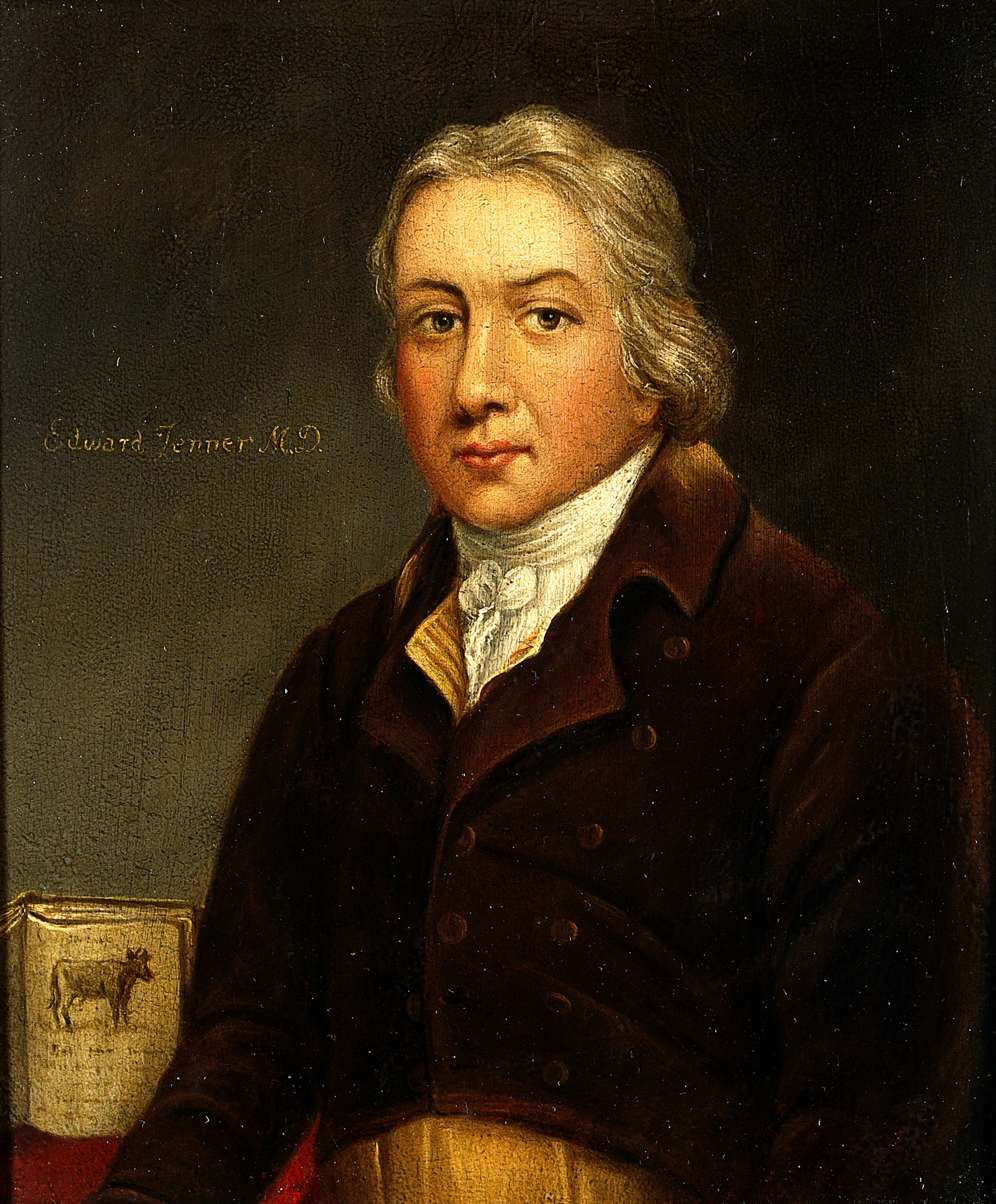
Edward Jenner

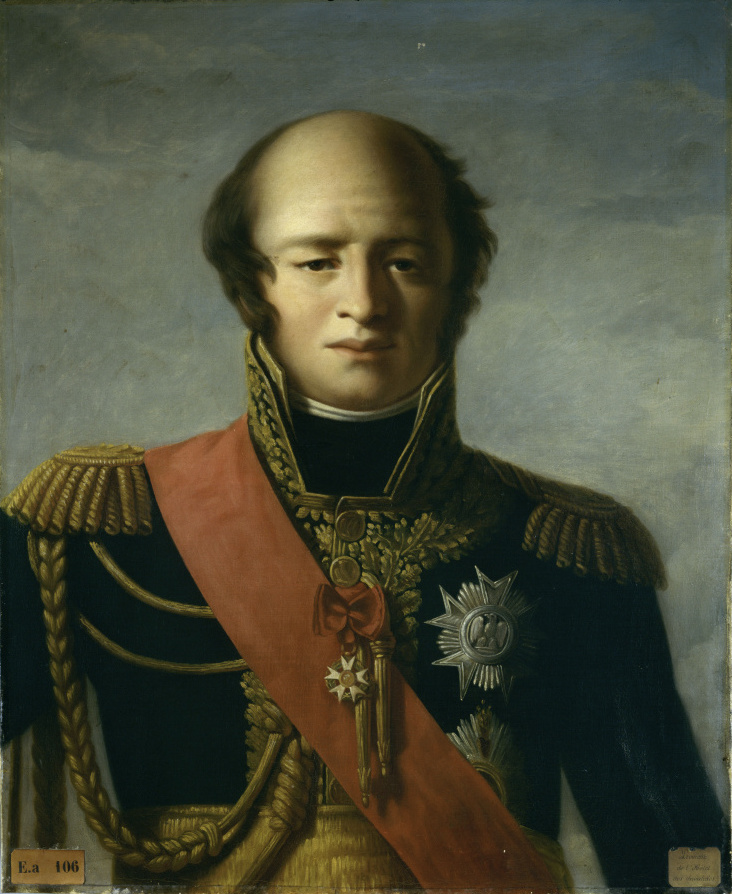
Louis-Nicolas Davout

- January 21
  - Gideon Olin, American politician (b. 1743)
  - Cayetano José Rodríguez, Argentine representative to the Congress of Tucumán
- January 22 – John Julius Angerstein, Russian-born English merchant, insurer and art collector (b. 1735)
- January 26 – Edward Jenner, English physician, medical researcher (b. 1749)
- January 27 – Charles Hutton, English mathematician (b. 1737)
- January 28 – Return J. Meigs Sr., American colonel (b. 1740)
- February 9 – Agnes Ibbetson, English plant physiologist (b. 1757)
- February 7 – Ann Radcliffe, English writer (b. 1764)
- February 21 – Charles Wolfe, Irish poet (b. 1791)
- March 1 – Pierre-Jean Garat, French Basque opera singer (b. 1764)
- March 5 – Magdalena Rudenschöld, Swedish conspirator (b. 1766)
- March 14
  - Charles François Dumouriez, French general (b. 1739)
  - John Jervis, 1st Earl of St Vincent, British Royal Navy admiral (b. 1735)
- March 18
  - Jean-Baptiste Bréval, French cellist (b. 1753)
  - Henry Brockholst Livingston, Associate Justice of the Supreme Court of the United States (b. 1757)
- March 19 – Adam Kazimierz Czartoryski, Polish aristocrat and patron of the arts (b. 1734)
- April 18 – George Cabot, American politician (b. 1752)
- June 1 – Louis-Nicolas Davout, French marshal (b. 1770)
- June 19 – William Combe, English writer, poet and adventurer (b. 1742)

=== July–December ===
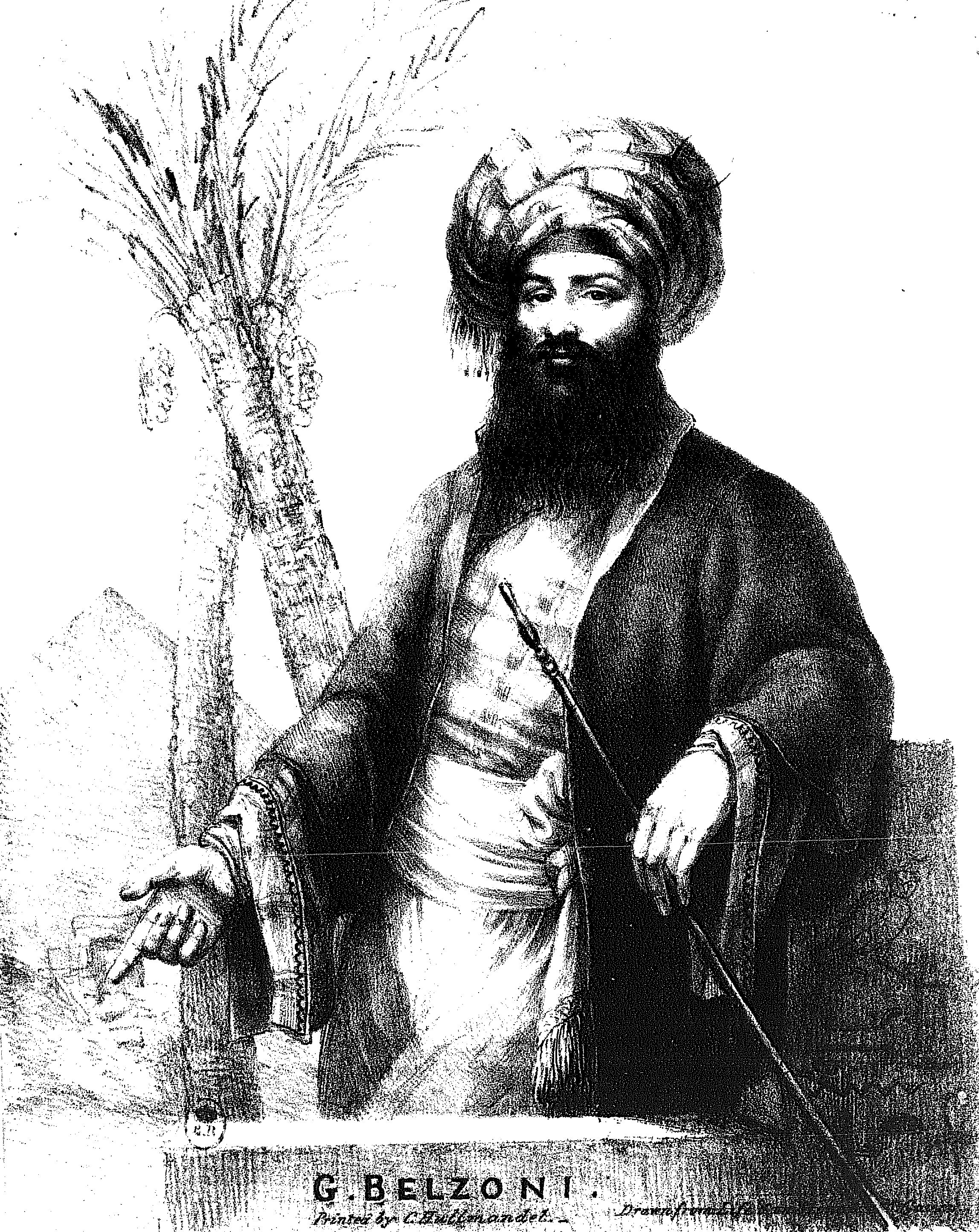
Giovanni Battista Belzoni

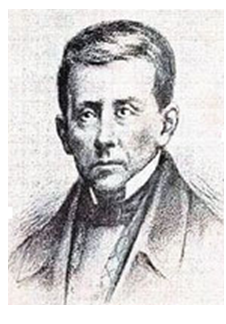
Gregorio José Ramírez

- July 4 – Estcourt Cresswell, English politician (b. 1823)
- July 8 – Sir Henry Raeburn, Scottish painter (b. 1756)
- August 1 – Francis Napier, 8th Lord Napier of Great Britain (b. 1758)
- August 7 – Mátyás Laáb, Croatian writer, translator (b. 1746)
- August 18 – John Treadwell, the fourth Governor of Connecticut (b. 1745)
- August 20 – Pope Pius VII, Italian Benedictine (b. 1742)
- August 22 – Lazare Carnot, French general, politician and mathematician (b. 1753)
- August 30 – Pierre Prévost, French panorama painter (b. 1764)
- September 11 – David Ricardo, English economist (b. 1772)
- September 17 – Abraham-Louis Breguet, Swiss horologist, inventor (b. 1747)
- September 23 – Matthew Baillie, Scottish physician, pathologist (b. 1761)
- September 28 – Charlotte Melmoth, English-born American actress (b. 1749)
- November 9 – Vasily Kapnist, Ukrainian-Russian poet, dramatist (b. 1758)
- November 11 – Richard Richards, British judge and politician (b. 1752)
- December 3 – Giovanni Battista Belzoni, Italian explorer, pioneer archaeologist of Egypt (b. 1778)
- December 4 – Gregorio José Ramírez, Costa Rican politician, merchant and marine (b. 1796)

1824

=== January–June ===
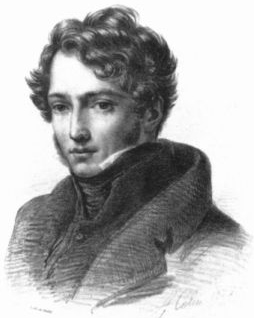
Théodore Géricault

- January 16 – Fabian Wrede, Swedish field marshal (b. 1760)
- January 21 – Jean-Baptiste Drouet, French revolutionary (b. 1765)
- January 26 – Théodore Géricault, French painter (b. 1791)
- January 29 – Princess Louise of Stolberg-Gedern, wife of Charles Edward Stuart (b. 1752)
- February 9 – Anne Catherine Emmerich, German Augustinian Canoness, mystic, Marian visionary, ecstatic and stigmatist (b. 1774)
- February 21 – Eugène de Beauharnais, son of Joséphine de Beauharnais (b. 1781)
- April 3 – Sally Seymour, American pastry chef and restaurateur
- April 19 – George Gordon Byron, 6th Baron Byron, English poet (b. 1788)
- May 15 – Johann Philipp Stadion, Count von Warthausen, German statesman (b. 1763)
- May 26 – Capel Lofft, English writer (b. 1751)
- May 29 – Jean-Baptiste Willermoz, French Freemason (b. 1730)
- June 16 – Charles-François Lebrun, duc de Plaisance, Third Consul of France (b. 1739)
- June 18 – Ferdinand III of Tuscany (b. 1769)
- June 21 – Étienne Aignan, French writer (b. 1773)

=== July–December ===
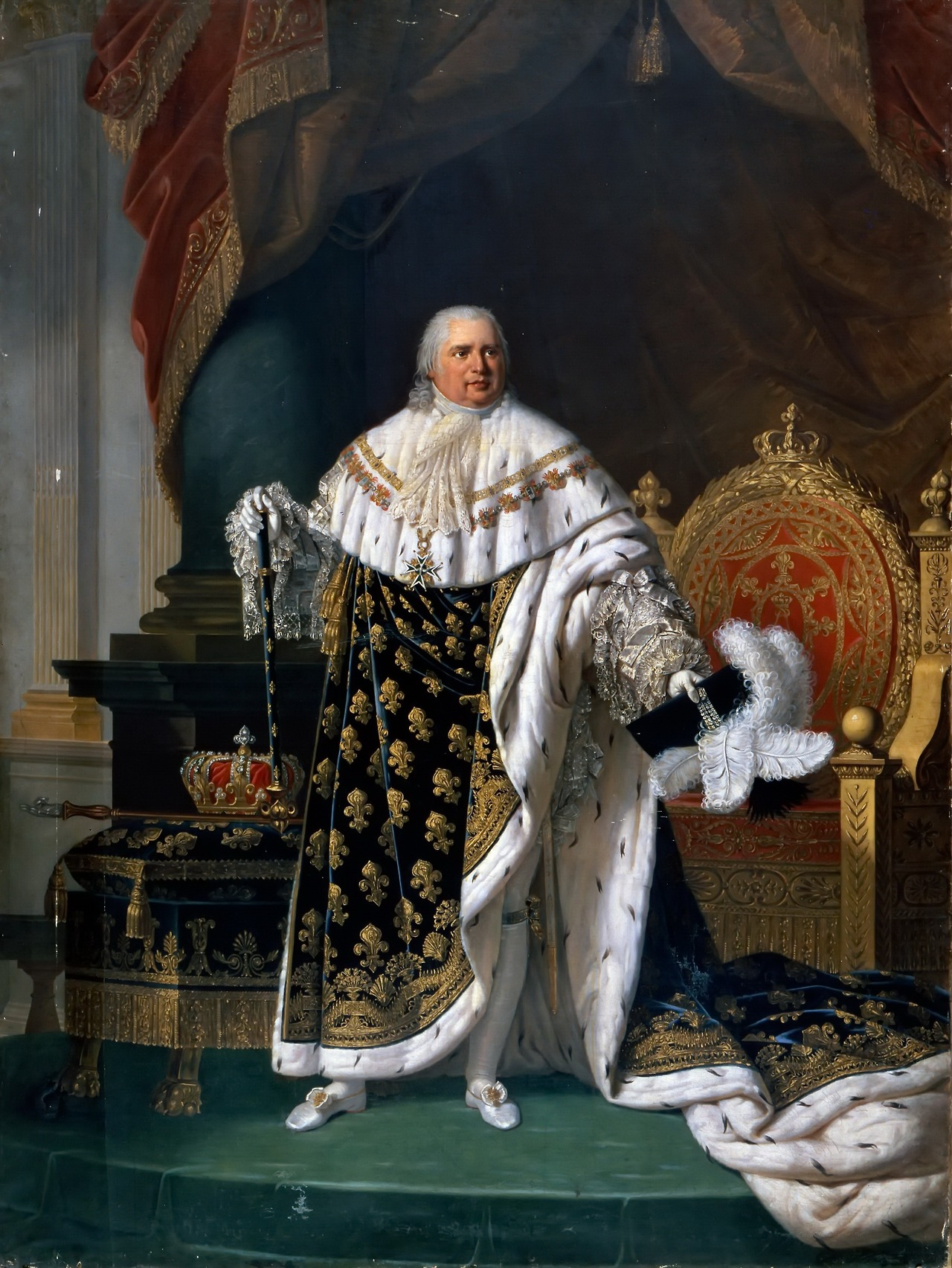
Louis XVIII

- July 14 – Kamehameha II, King of Hawaii (b. 1797)
- July 19
  - Agustín de Iturbide, Emperor of Mexico (b. 1783)
  - Alexander Pearce, Irish-born criminal transportee to Van Diemen's Land and cannibal, executed (b. 1790)
- July 20 – Maine de Biran, French philosopher (b. 1766)
- July 21 – Buddha Loetla Nabhalai (Rama II), King of Siam (Thailand) (b. 1767)
- August 12 – Charles Nerinckx, Belgian-born founder of the Sisters of Loretto (b. 1761)
- August 24 – Valentine Quin, 1st Earl of Dunraven and Mount-Earl, Irish politician (b. 1752)
- September 16 – King Louis XVIII of France (b. 1755)
- October 13 – Sir James Lamb, 1st Baronet of England (b. 1752)
- October 30 – Charles Maturin, Irish writer (b. 1773)
- December 5 – Anne Louise Boyvin d'Hardancourt Brillon de Jouy, French confidant of Benjamin Franklin (b. 1744)
- December 21 – James Parkinson, English surgeon, apothecary, geologist, palaeontologist and political activist (b. 1755)
- December 23 – Pushmataha, chief of the Choctaw Nation (b. c. 1764)

=== Dates unknown ===
- Ali-Qoli Khan Qajar, half-brother of Agha Mohammad Khan Qajar, the founder of the Qajar dynasty of Iran (b. c. 1756)

1825

=== January–June ===
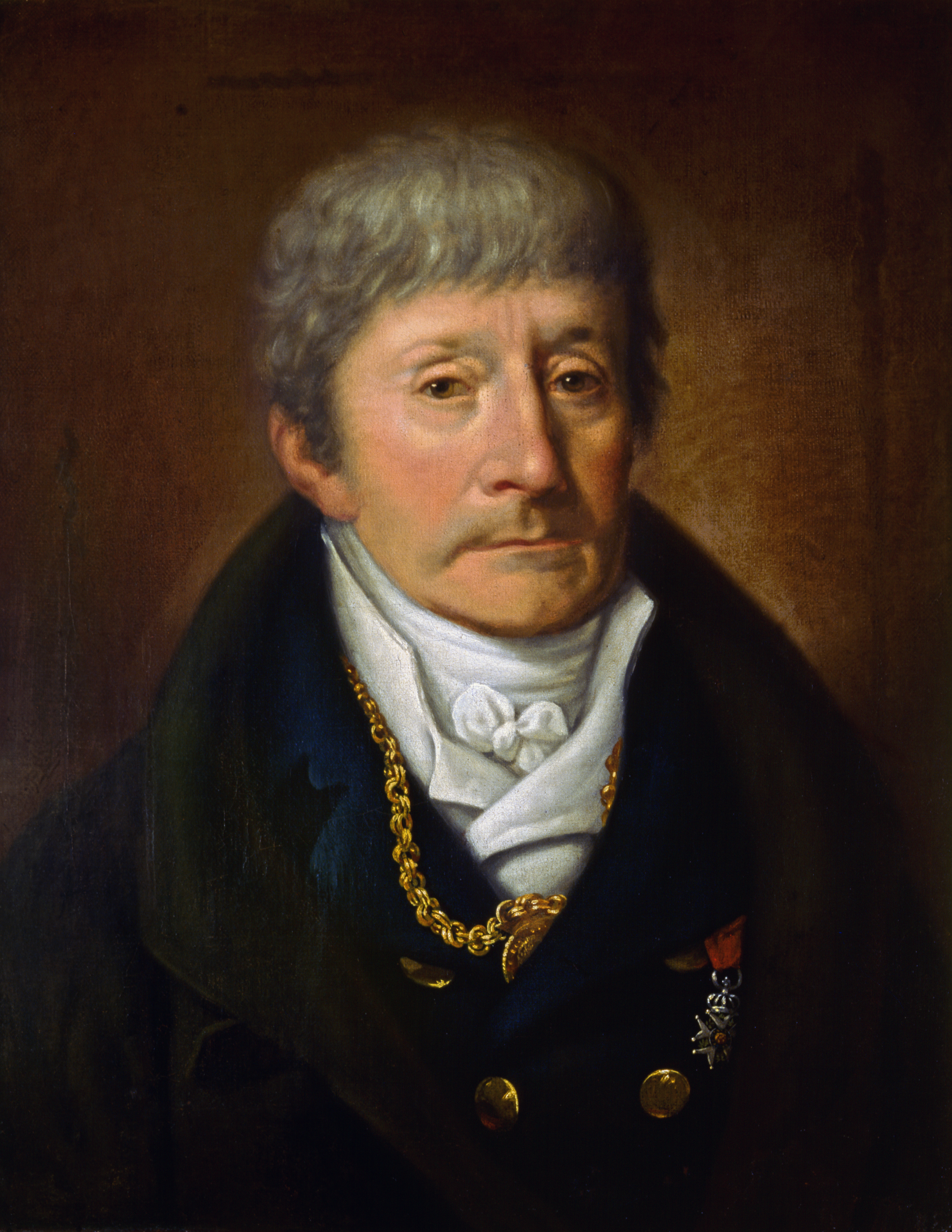
Antonio Salieri

Eleanor Anne Porden

- January 4 – Ferdinand I of the Two Sicilies (b. 1751)
- January 8 – Eli Whitney, American inventor (b. 1765)
- February 22 – Eleanor Anne Porden, English poet (b. 1795)
- February 24 – Thomas Bowdler, English physician (b. 1754)
- March 1
  - John Brooks (governor), Massachusetts doctor, military officer, governor (b. 1752)
  - John Haggin, Indian fighter, one of the earliest settlers of Kentucky (b. 1753)
- March 4 – Hercules Mulligan, tailor, spy during the American Revolutionary War (b. 1740)
- March 6 – Samuel Parr, English schoolmaster (b. 1747)
- March 25 – Antoine Fabre d'Olivet, French writer (b. 1767)
- March 27 – Alexander Lindsay, 6th Earl of Balcarres, British Army general (b. 1752)
- April 23 – Friedrich Müller, German painter, narrator, lyricist and dramatist (b. 1749)
- April 17 – Henry Fuseli, Swiss painter and writer (b. 1741)
- May 7 – Antonio Salieri, Italian composer (b. 1750)
- May 13 – Charles Whitworth, 1st Earl Whitworth, British diplomat (b. 1752)
- May 19 – Claude Henri de Rouvroy, comte de Saint-Simon, French politician (b. 1760)
- May 22 – Laskarina Bouboulina, Greek independence fighter, heroine (shot) (b. 1771)
- May 23 – Ras Gugsa of Yejju, Regent of the Emperor of Ethiopia
- June 11 – Daniel D. Tompkins, 6th Vice President of the United States (b. 1774)
- June 14 – Pierre Charles L'Enfant, French architect (b. 1754)
- June 27 – Domenico Vantini, Italian painter

=== July–December ===
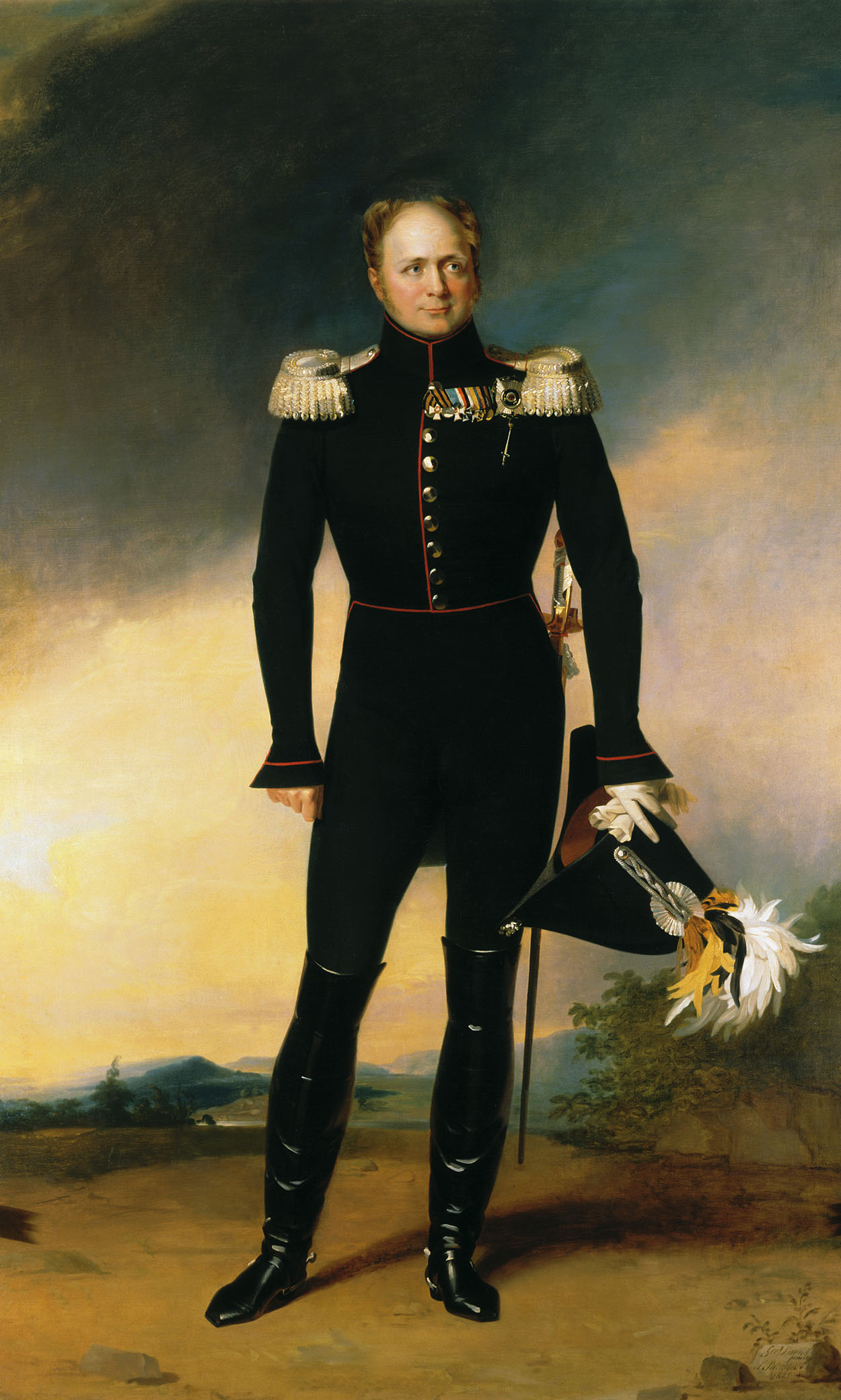
Alexander I of Russia

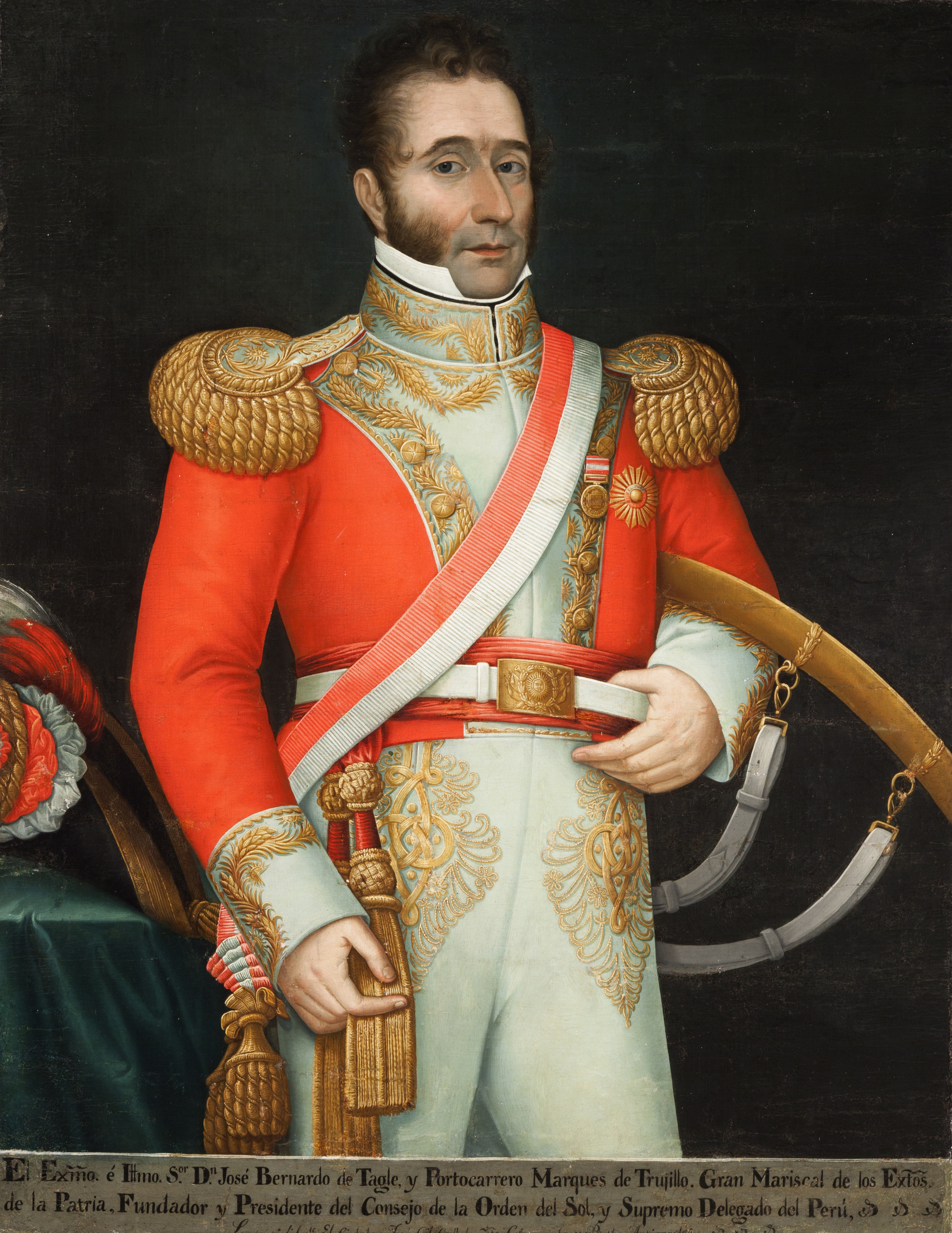
José Bernardo de Tagle

- July 12 – Dorothea von Rodde-Schlözer, German scholar (b. 1770)
- July 15 – David Ochterlony, Massachusetts-born general with the East India Company (b. 1758)
- August 3 – Ambrogio Minoja, Italian composer, professor of music (b. 1752)
- August 16 – Charles Cotesworth Pinckney, American politician, soldier (b. 1746)
- August 20 – William Waldegrave, 1st Baron Radstock, British admiral, Governor of Newfoundland (b. 1753)
- September 4 – Frederick Howard, 5th Earl of Carlisle (b. 1748)
- September 26 – José Bernardo de Tagle y Portocarrero, Marquis of Torre Tagle, Peruvian soldier and politician, 2nd President of Peru (b. 1779)
- September 29 – Daniel Shays, American Revolutionary War captain, also the leader of the Shays's Rebellion (b. 1747)
- October 6 – Bernard Germain de Lacépède, French naturalist (b. 1756)
- October 9 – Lucia Pytter, Norwegian philanthropist (b. 1762)
- October 13 – King Maximilian I Joseph of Bavaria (b. 1756)
- November 7 – Charlotte Dacre, English Gothic novelist (b. c. 1772)
- November 14 – Jean Paul, German writer (b. 1763)
- December 1 – Emperor Alexander I of Russia (November 19 on the Russian calendar) b. 1777)
- December 28 – James Wilkinson, American soldier, statesman (b. 1757)
- December 29 – Jacques-Louis David, French painter (b. 1748)

=== Dates unknown ===
- Armand-Marie-Jacques de Chastenet, Marquis of Puységur, French mesmerist (b. 1751)
- Huang Peilie, Chinese bibliophile (b. 1763)
- Maria Angela Ardinghelli, Italian scientific translator (b. 1730)

1826

=== January–June ===
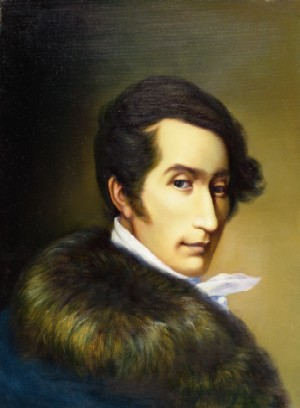
Carl Maria von Weber

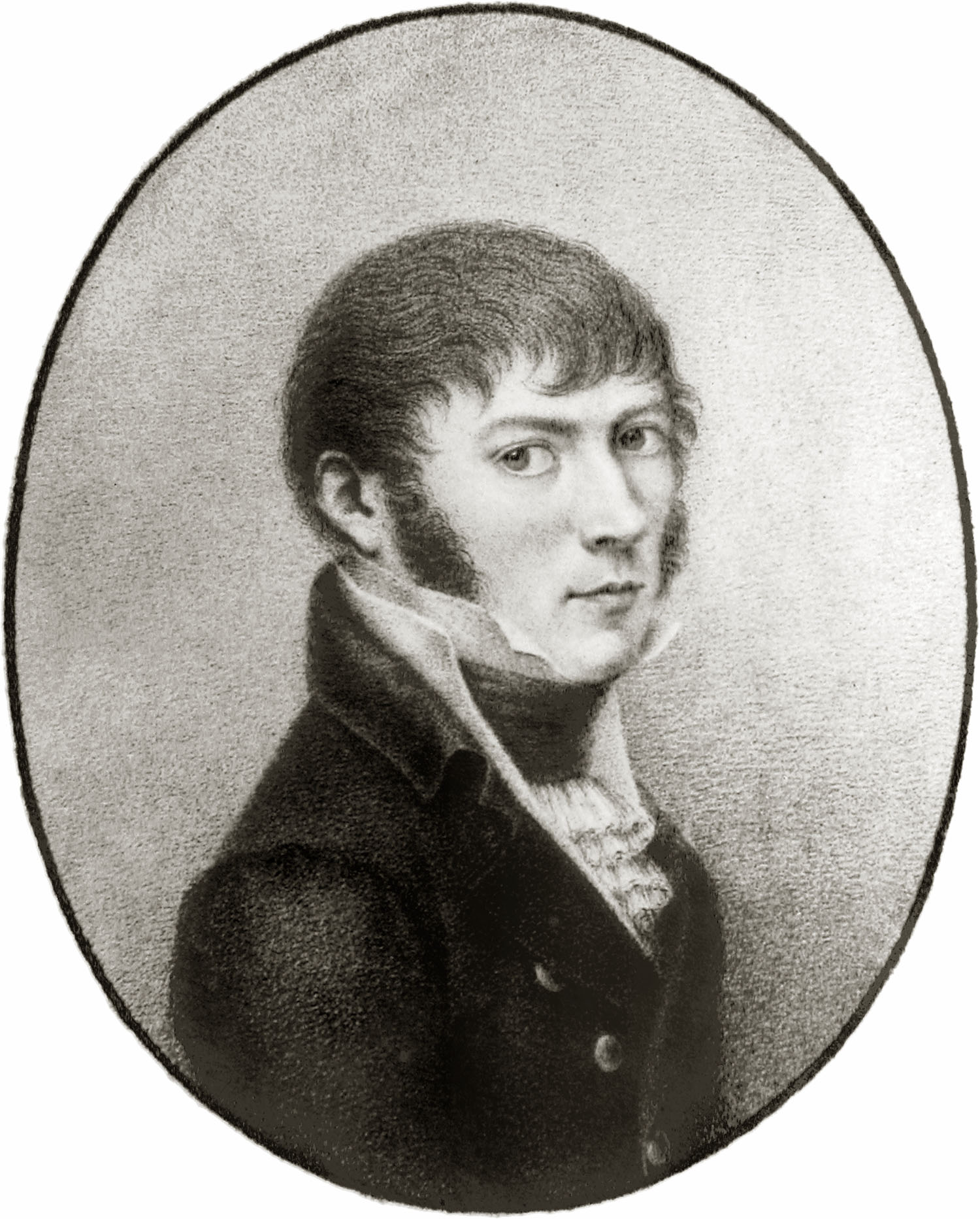
Joseph von Fraunhofer

- January 3
  - Marie Le Masson Le Golft, French naturalist (b. 1750)
  - Louis-Gabriel Suchet, French marshal (b. 1770)
- January 17 – Juan Crisóstomo Arriaga, Spanish composer (b. 1806)
- January 23 – Abraham Woodhull, Patriot spy during the American Revolutionary War (b. 1750)
- February 17 – John Manners-Sutton, British politician (b. 1752)
- March 10 – King John VI of Portugal (b. 1767)
- March 29 – Johann Heinrich Voss, German poet (b. 1751)
- April 11 – Anton Walter, Austrian piano maker (b. 1752)
- April 25 – Karl Ludwig von Phull, German military leader (b. 1757)
- May 4
  - Thomas Jeffrey, English-born bushranger, serial killer and cannibal in Van Diemen's Land, hanged (b. c.1791)
  - Sebastián Kindelán y O'Regan, Spanish colonial governor in Cuba (b. 1757)
- May 7 – Sophie Hagman, Swedish ballerina, royal mistress (b. 1758)
- May 16
  - Empress Elizabeth Alexeievna, consort of Alexander I of Russia (b. 1779)
  - Joseph Holt, 1798 United Irish rebel general (b. 1756)
- June 3 – Nikolay Karamzin, Russian language reformer (b. 1766)
- June 5 – Carl Maria von Weber, German composer (b. 1786)
- June 7 – Joseph von Fraunhofer, German optician (b. 1787)

=== July–December ===
- July 4
  - Thomas Jefferson, 83, 3rd President of the United States (b. 1743), at 12:50 p.m. at his home near Charlottesville, Virginia.
  - John Adams, 90, 2nd President of the United States (b. 1735), at 6:20 p.m. at his home in Quincy, Massachusetts.
- July 5
  - Joseph Proust, French chemist (b. 1754)
  - Stamford Raffles, British colonial governor, founder of Singapore (b. 1781)
- July 8 – Luther Martin, delegate to the American Constitutional Convention (b. 1746)
- July 22 – Giuseppe Piazzi, Italian astronomer (b. 1746)
- July 25 – Sergey Muravyov-Apostol, Russian Army officer (b. 1796)
- July 26 – James Winchester, American general and politician (b. 1752)
- August 2 – George Finch, 9th Earl of Winchilsea, English cricketer (b. 1752)
- August 13 – René Laennec, French physician (b. 1781)
- August 15 – Hanne Tott, Danish circus artist, manager (b. 1771)
- August 28 – Józef Zajączek, Polish general, politician (b. 1752)
- September 7 – Robert Wright (politician), American politician (b. 1752)
- September 12 – Eliphalet Pearson, American educator (b. 1752)
- October 8 – Marie-Guillemine Benoist, French painter (b. 1768)
- October 25 – Philippe Pinel, French physician (b. 1745)
- November 17 – Caroline Müller, Danish opera singer (b. 1755)
- November 23 – Johann Elert Bode, German astronomer (b. 1747)
- December 3 – Levin August von Bennigsen German general (b. 1745)
- December 11 – Queen-Empress Maria Leopoldina, consort of Pedro IV of Portugal & I of Brazil (b. 1797)

1827

=== January–June ===
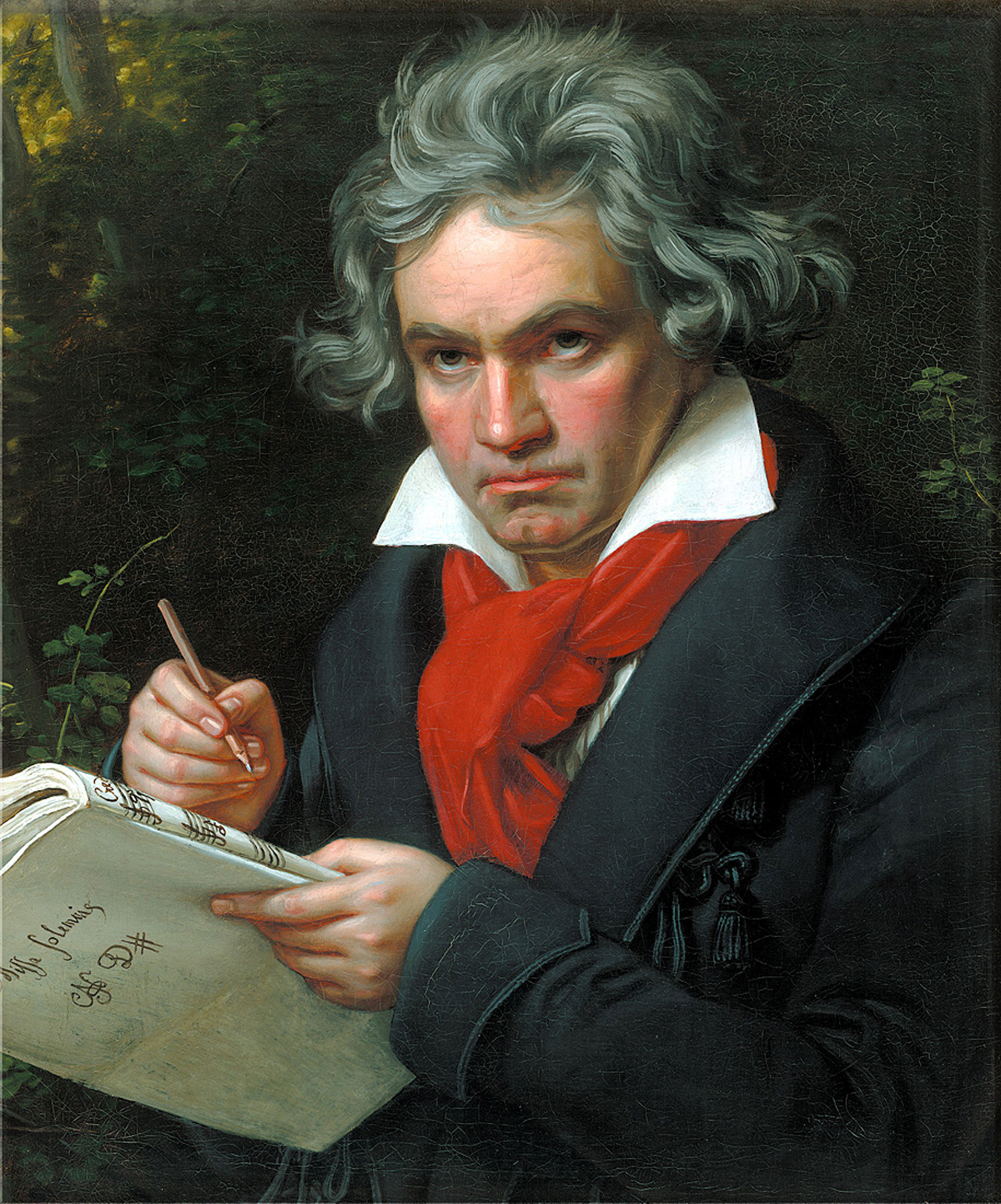
Ludwig van Beethoven

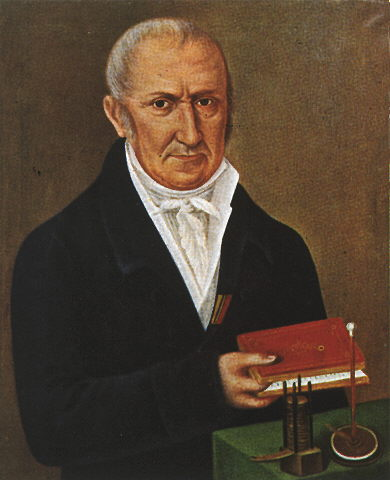
Alessandro Volta

- January 5 – Prince Frederick, Duke of York and Albany, heir-presumptive to the British throne (b. 1763)
- January 19 – Ludwig von Brauchitsch, Prussian general (b. 1757)
- February 13 – Caleb Brewster, Patriot spy during the American Revolutionary War (b. 1747)
- February 19 – Armand Augustin Louis de Caulaincourt, French general, diplomat (b. 1773)
- February 23 – Felipe Enrique Neri, Texas legislator, colonizer (b. 1759)
- February 17 – Johann Heinrich Pestalozzi, Swiss pedagogue (b. 1746)
- February 28 – Thomas Holloway, English portrait painter, engraver (b. 1748)
- March 5
  - Pierre-Simon Laplace, French mathematician (b. 1749)
  - Alessandro Volta, Italian physicist (b. 1745)
- March 26 – Ludwig van Beethoven, German composer (b. 1770)
- March 31 – Marie Barch, Danish ballerina (b. 1744)
- April 12 – Michele Troja, Italian physician (b. 1747)
- April 29
  - Deborah Sampson, first American female soldier (b. 1760)
  - Rufus King, American lawyer, politician and diplomat (b. 1755)
- May 5 – Frederick Augustus I of Saxony (b. 1750)
- May 27 – Melesina Trench, Irish-born writer, socialite (b. 1768)
- June 26 – Samuel Crompton, English inventor (b. 1753)

=== July–December ===
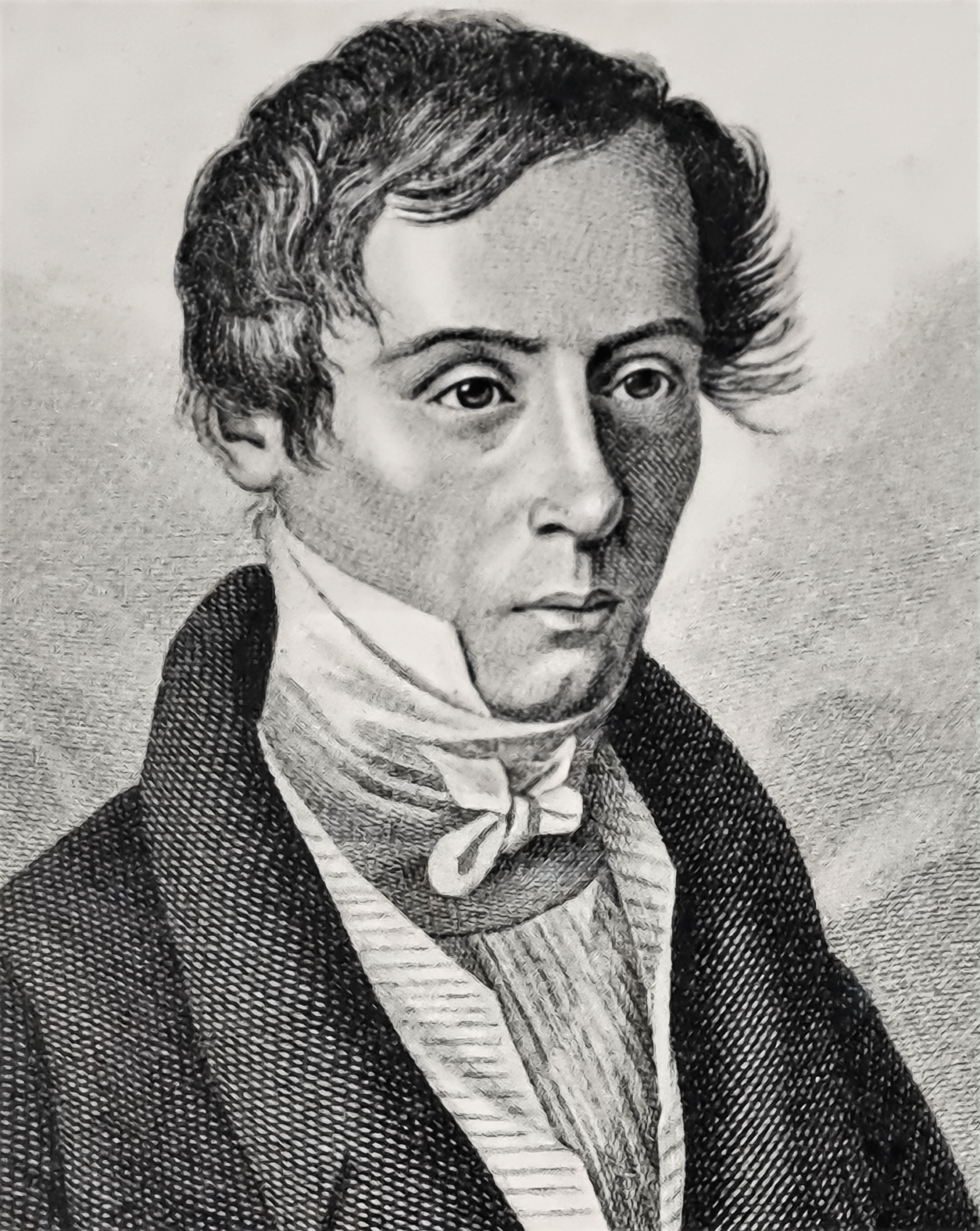
Augustin-Jean Fresnel

- July 14 – Augustin-Jean Fresnel, French physicist (b. 1788)
- July 27 – Fredrique Eleonore Baptiste, Finnish actress and playwright
- August 8 – George Canning, Prime Minister of the United Kingdom (b. 1770)
- August 12 – William Blake, English poet and artist (b. 1757)
- September 10 – Ugo Foscolo, Greek-born Italian writer, revolutionary and poet (b. 1778)
- October 12 – John Eager Howard, American politician (b. 1752)
- November 7 – Maria Theresia of Tuscany, Queen of Saxony (b. 1767)
- November 10 – St. George Tucker, United States federal judge (b. 1752)
- December 3 – Servando Teresa de Mier, Mexican preacher (b. 1765)
- December 21 – Anton II, Catholicos Patriarch of Georgia (b. 1762)

1828

=== January–June ===
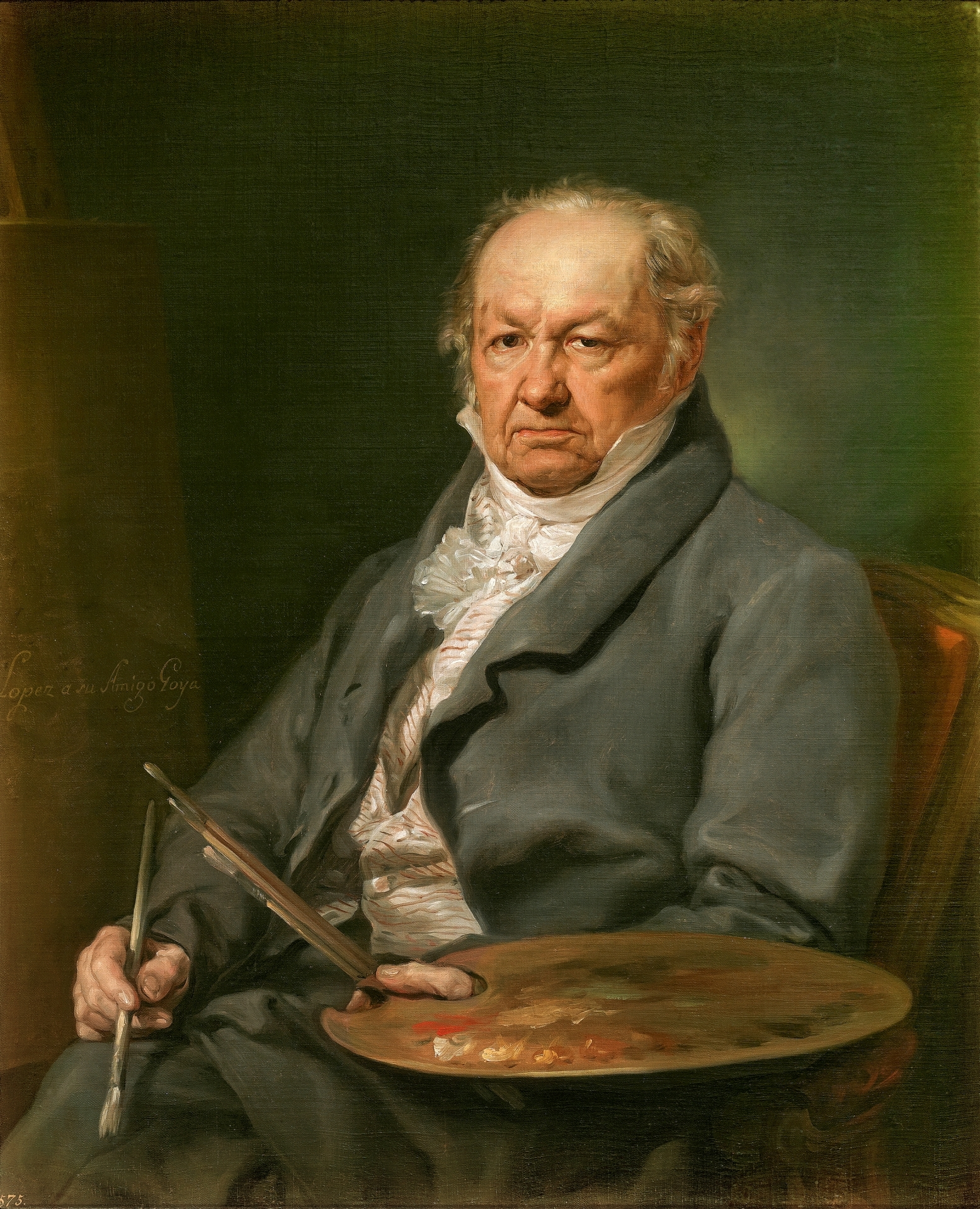
Francisco Goya

- January 10 – François de Neufchâteau, French politician, intellectual (b. 1750)
- January 13 – Theodore Foster, American politician (b. 1752)
- February 11 – DeWitt Clinton, 6th Governor of New York, United States Senator (b. 1769)
- March 12 – Jack Randall, early English boxing champion
- April 16 – Francisco Goya, Spanish painter (b. 1746)
- May 8 – Mauro Giuliani, Italian composer (b. 1781)
- May 16 – William Congreve, British rocket pioneer (b. 1772)
- May 28 – Daikokuya Kōdayū, Japanese castaway (b. 1751)
- June 1 – Lyncoya Jackson, second adopted son of American President Andrew Jackson (b. c. 1811)
- June 21 – Leandro Fernández de Moratín, Spanish dramatist, poet (b. 1760)
- June 25 – Richard W. Meade, American merchant and art collector (b. 1762)

=== July–December ===
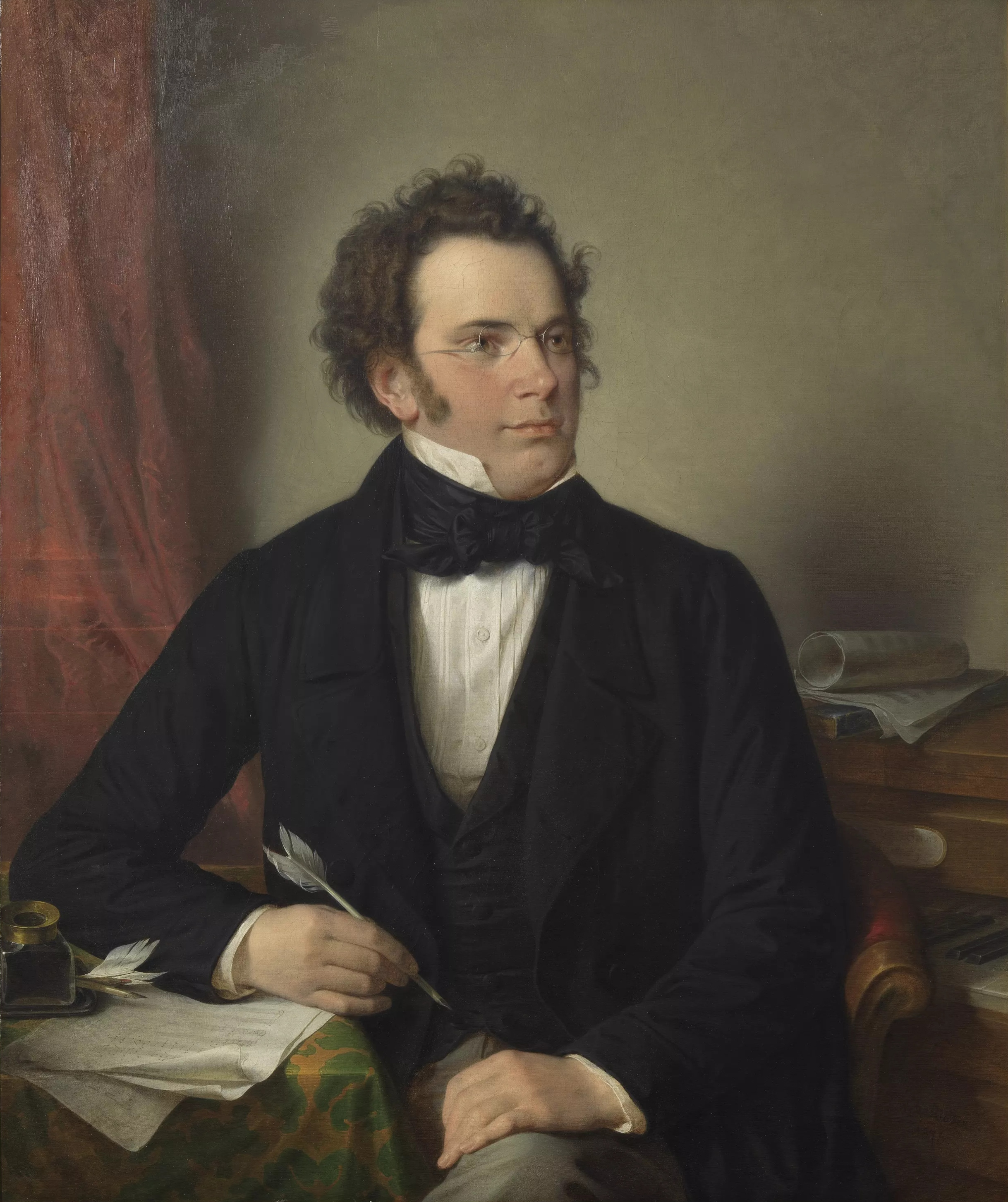
Franz Schubert

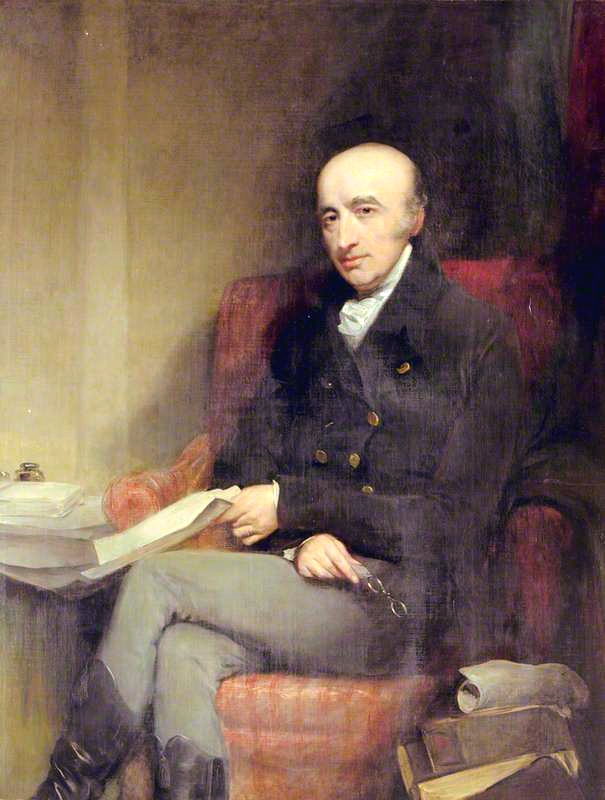
William Hyde Wollaston

- July 9
  - Cathinka Buchwieser, German operatic singer and actress (b. 1789)
  - Gilbert Stuart, American painter from Rhode Island (b. 1755)
- July 15 – Jean-Antoine Houdon, French sculptor (b. 1741)
- July 16 – William Few, American politician (b. 1748)
- July 21 – Charles Manners-Sutton, Archbishop of Canterbury (b. 1755)
- July 30 – François Isaac de Rivaz, French inventor, politician (b. 1752)
- August 8 – Carl Peter Thunberg, Swedish botanist (b. 1743)
- August 22 – Franz Joseph Gall, German phrenologist (b. 1758)
- August 23 – John Foster, 1st Baron Oriel, Irish politician (b. 1740)
- September 20 – George Bethune English, American explorer, writer (b. 1797)
- September 22 – Shaka, most influential leader of the Zulu Kingdom (b. 1787)
- September 25 – Charlotta Seuerling, Swedish musician (b. 1783)
- October 12 – Ioan Nicolidi of Pindus, Aromanian physician and noble (b. 1737)
- October 26 – Albrecht Thaer, German agronomist (b. 1752)
- October 29 – Luke Hansard, English printer (b. 1752)
- October 31 – John Marsh, English music composer (b. 1752)
- November 5 – Maria Feodorovna (Sophie Dorothea of Württemberg), Empress of Paul I of Russia (b. 1759)
- November 15 – Amalie of Zweibrücken-Birkenfeld, First Queen of Saxony/Duchess of Warsaw (b. 1752)
- November 19 – Franz Schubert, Austrian composer and songwriter (b. 1797)
- December 4 – Robert Jenkinson, 2nd Earl of Liverpool, Prime Minister of the United Kingdom (b. 1770)
- December 22
  - Robert Blair, Scottish astronomer (b. 1748)
  - Rachel Jackson, wife of U.S. President Andrew Jackson (b. 1767)
  - Karl Mack von Leiberich, Austrian soldier (b. 1752)
  - William Hyde Wollaston, English chemist (b. 1766)

1829

=== January–June ===
- January 6 – Amalia Holst, German writer, intellectual, and feminist (b. 1758)
- January 12 – Karl Wilhelm Friedrich Schlegel, German poet, philosopher, and philologist (b. 1772)
- January 25 – William Shield, English violinist, composer (b. 1748)
- January 29
  - Paul Barras, French politician (b. 1755)
  - István Pauli (Pável) Hungarian Slovene priest, writer (b. 1760)
  - Timothy Pickering, American politician (b. 1745)
- February 10 – Pope Leo XII (b. 1760)
- February 11 – Alexander Griboyedov, Russian playwright, diplomat (b. 1795)
- February 17 – Michel Ange Bernard Mangourit, French diplomat (b. 1752)
- February 21 – Kittur Chennamma, Indian queen regnant (b. 1778)
- February 26 – Johann Heinrich Wilhelm Tischbein, German painter (b. 1751)
- March 2 – Karl Gottfried Hagen, German chemist (b. 1749)
- March 5 – John Adams, last surviving Bounty mutineer (b. 1767)
- March 8 – Francesco Ruspoli, 3rd Prince of Cerveteri (b. 1752)
- March 30 – Christopher Frederik Lowzow, Danish-Norwegian army officer (b. 1752)
- April 6 – Niels Henrik Abel, Norwegian mathematician (b. 1802)
- April 18 – Veronika Gut, Swiss rebel heroine (b. 1757)
- May 10 – Thomas Young, English physician, linguist (b. 1773)
- May 17 – John Jay, first Chief Justice of the United States (b. 1745)
- May 21 – Peter I, Grand Duke of Oldenburg (b. 1755)

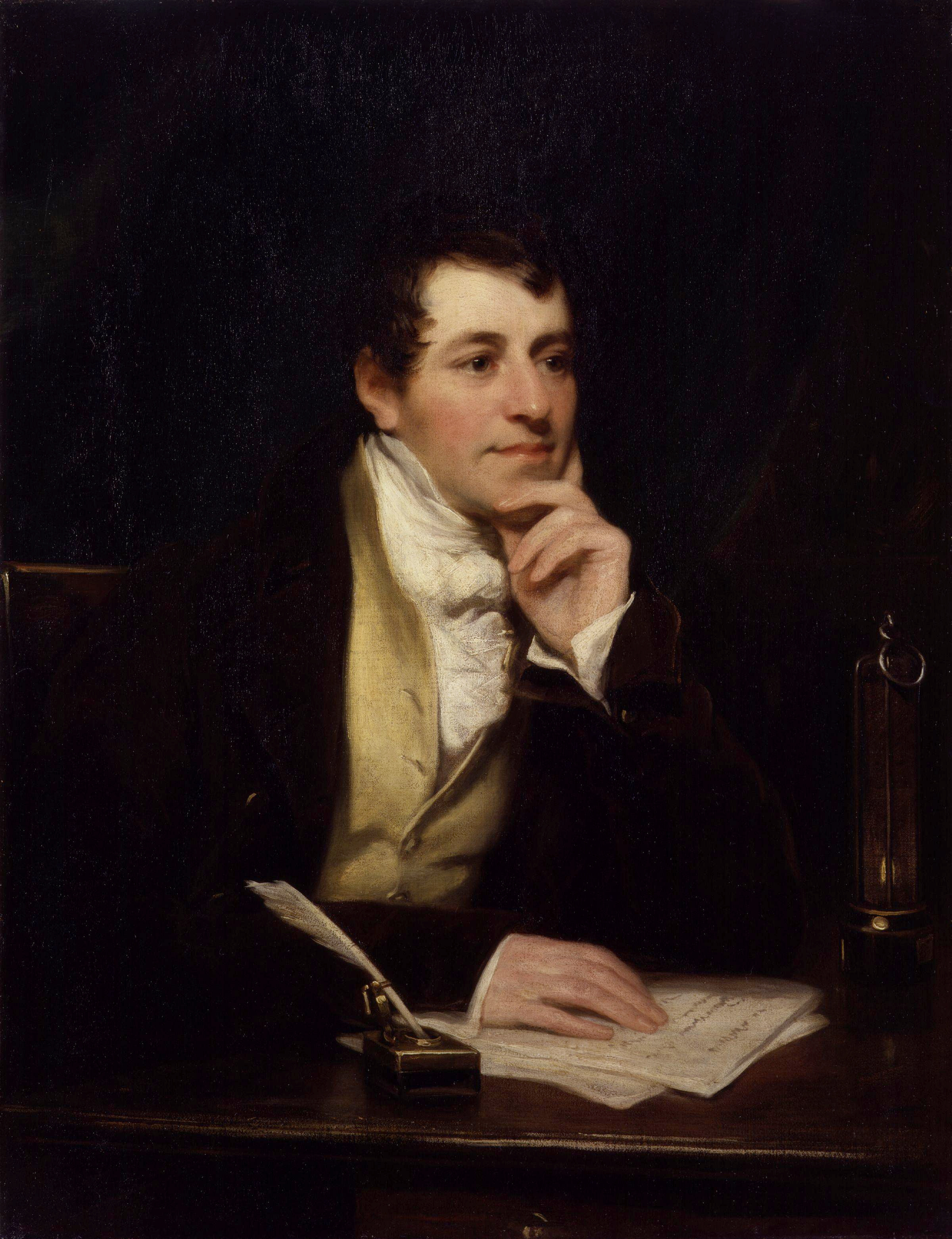
Humphry Davy

- May 29 – Humphry Davy, British chemist (b. 1778)
- May 30 – Louis Aloysius, Prince of Hohenlohe-Waldenburg-Bartenstein (b. 1765)
- June 6 – Shanawdithit, last known pure-blooded member of the Beothuk people (b. c. 1801)
- June 15 – Therese Huber, German writer and scholar (b. 1764)
- June 27 – James Smithson, British mineralogist, chemist, whose fortune eventually went to the United States of America, and was used to initially fund the Smithsonian Institution (b. 1764)

=== July–December ===
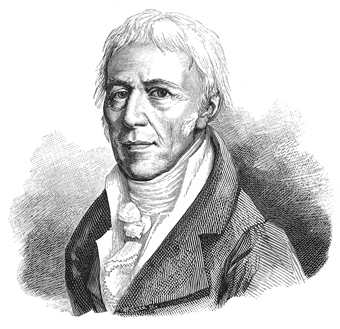
Jean-Baptiste Lamarck

- July 11 – Hannah Mather Crocker, American essayist, advocate of women's rights in America (b. 1752)
- July 23 – Wojciech Bogusławski, actor and director, Father of Polish Theatre (b. 1757)
- August 7 – John Reeves, British judge (b. 1752)
- September 28 – David Gillespie, American surveyor and politician (b. 1774)
- October 10 – Maria Elizabetha Jacson, British botanist (b. 1755)
- October 29 – Maria Anna Mozart ("Nannerl"), Austrian musician and composer, sister of Wolfgang Amadeus Mozart (b. 1751)
- November 12 – Jean-Baptiste Regnault, French painter (b. 1754)
- November 14
  - Maria Beatrice d'Este, Duchess of Massa, Duchess of Massa and Princess of Carrara (b. 1750)
  - Louis Nicolas Vauquelin, French chemist, discoverer of beryllium and chromium (b. 1763)
- November 26 – Bushrod Washington, American Supreme Court justice (b. 1762)
- December 12 – John Lansing Jr., American statesman (disappeared) (b. 1754)
- December 28
  - Elizabeth Freeman, African American slave
  - Jean-Baptiste Lamarck, French scientist (b. 1744)
  - Bill Richmond, British boxer (b. 1763)
- December 29 – Princess Henrietta of Nassau-Weilburg (b. 1797) (scarlet fever)

=== Date unknown ===
- Huang Lü, Chinese scientist
