= 1827 =

1827 in various calendars
- Gregorian calendar: 1827; MDCCCXXVII
- Ab urbe condita: 2580
- Armenian calendar: 1276; ԹՎ ՌՄՀԶ
- Assyrian calendar: 6577
- Balinese saka calendar: 1748–1749
- Bengali calendar: 1233–1234
- Berber calendar: 2777
- British Regnal year: 7 Geo. 4 – 8 Geo. 4
- Buddhist calendar: 2371
- Burmese calendar: 1189
- Byzantine calendar: 7335–7336
- Chinese calendar: 丙戌年 (Fire Dog); 4524 or 4317 — to — 丁亥年 (Fire Pig); 4525 or 4318
- Coptic calendar: 1543–1544
- Discordian calendar: 2993
- Ethiopian calendar: 1819–1820
- Hebrew calendar: 5587–5588
- Hindu calendars
- Vikram Samvat: 1883–1884
- Shaka Samvat: 1748–1749
- Kali Yuga: 4927–4928
- Holocene calendar: 11827
- Igbo calendar: 827–828
- Iranian calendar: 1205–1206
- Islamic calendar: 1242–1243
- Japanese calendar: Bunsei 10 (文政１０年)
- Javanese calendar: 1754–1755
- Julian calendar: Gregorian minus 12 days
- Korean calendar: 4160
- Minguo calendar: 85 before ROC 民前85年
- Nanakshahi calendar: 359
- Thai solar calendar: 2369–2370
- Tibetan calendar: མེ་ཕོ་ཁྱི་ལོ་ (male Fire-Dog); 1953 or 1572 or 800 — to — མེ་མོ་ཕག་ལོ་ (female Fire-Boar); 1954 or 1573 or 801

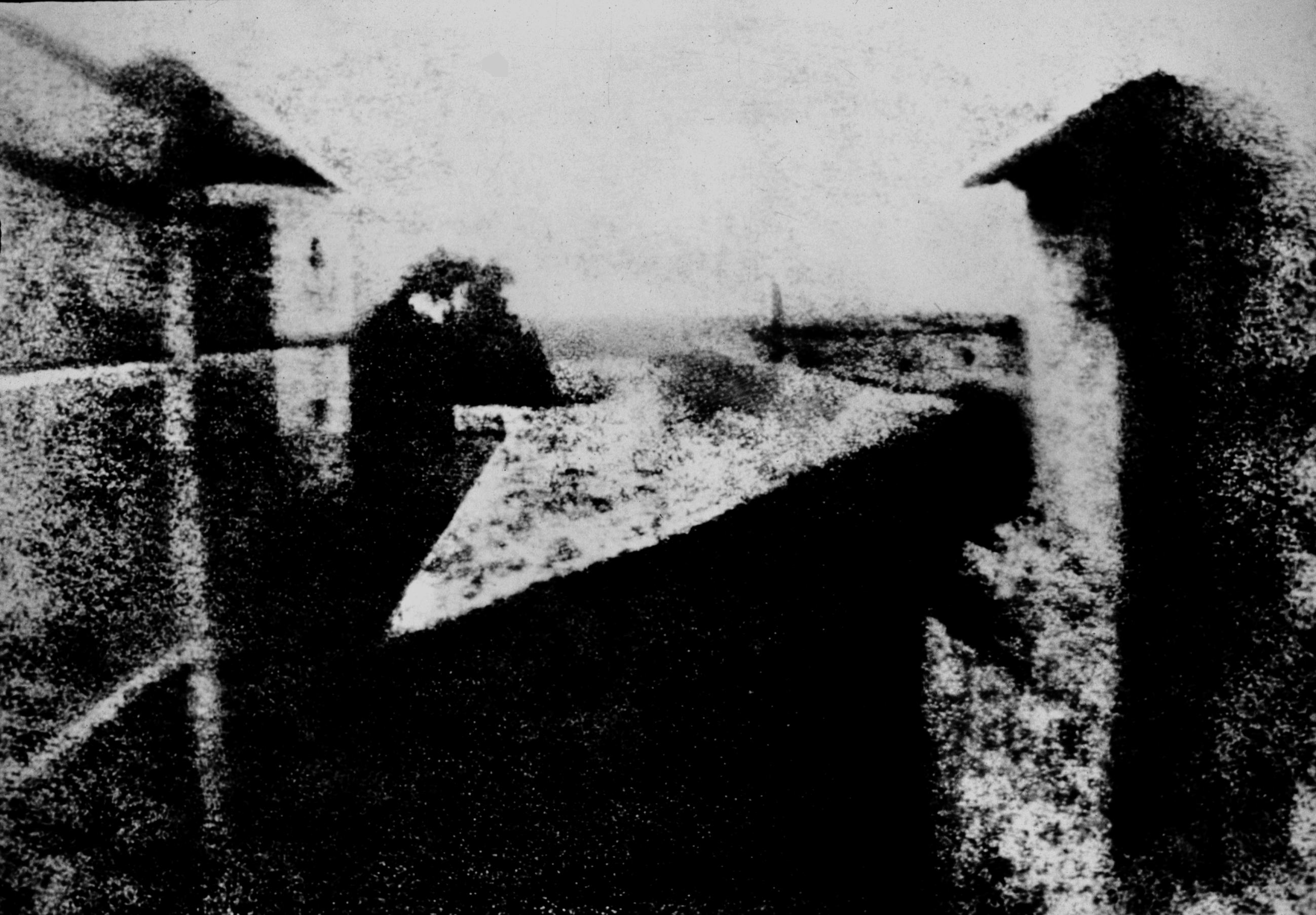
The oldest-known surviving photograph in history, Niepce's View from the Window at Le Gras, taken between June 4 and July 18, 1827.

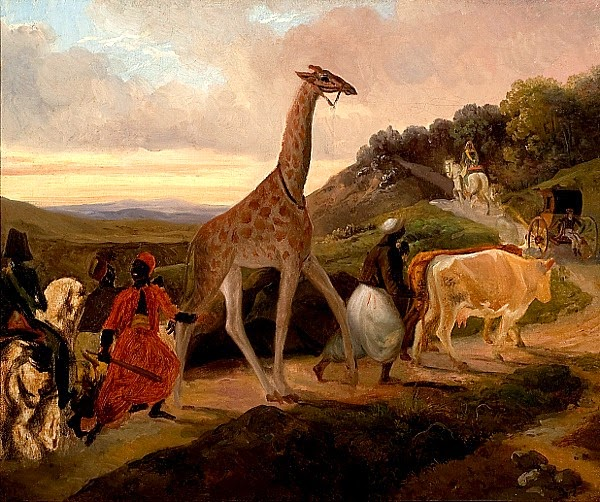
May 20 to July 9: Zarafa, the first giraffe to be seen in Europe since the 16th century, travels from Marseille to Paris.

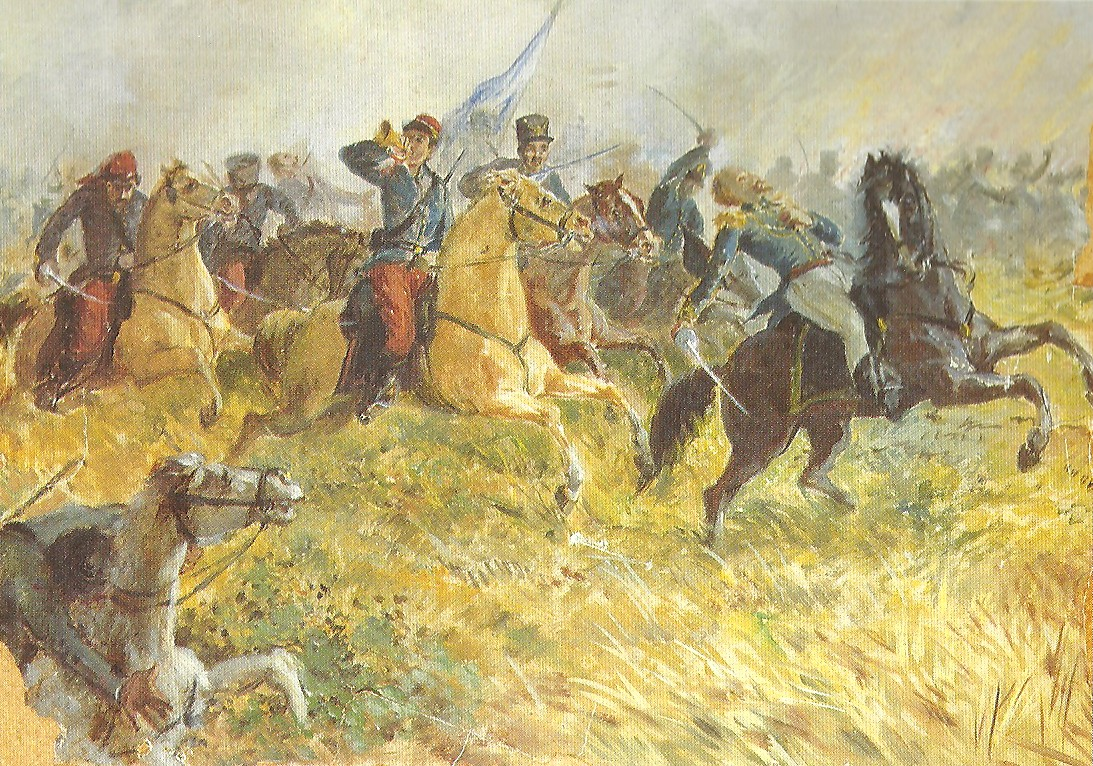
February 20: The Battle of Ituzaingó is fought on the border between Brazil and the United Provinces, leaving hundreds of combatants dead.

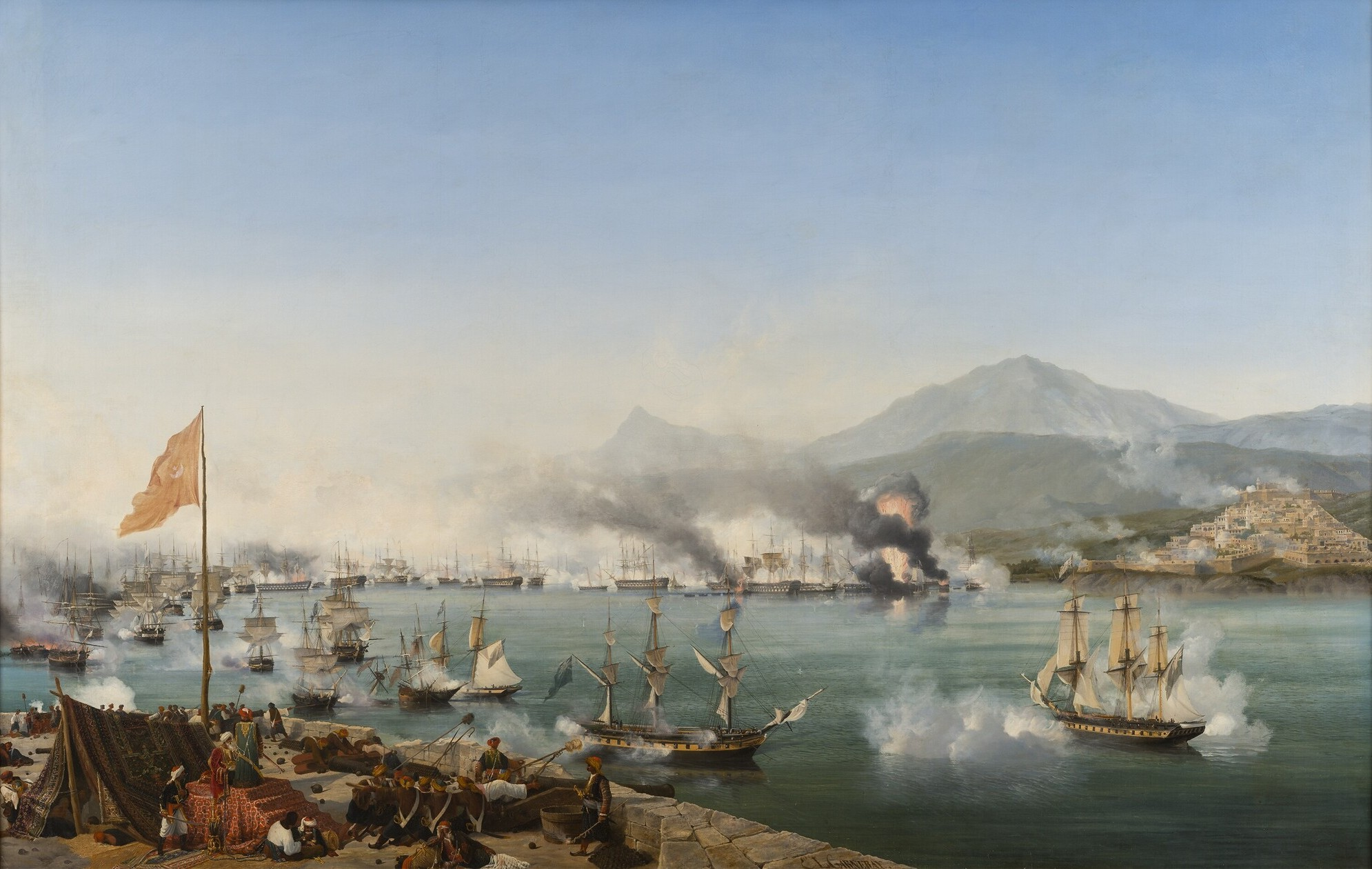
October 20: British, French and Russian ships defeat the Ottoman Navy in the Battle of Navarino.(Naval Battle of Navarino by Ambroise Louis Garneray)

1827 (MDCCCXXVII) was a common year starting on Monday of the Gregorian calendar and a common year starting on Saturday of the Julian calendar, the 1827th year of the Common Era (CE) and Anno Domini (AD) designations, the 827th year of the 2nd millennium, the 27th year of the 19th century, and the 8th year of the 1820s decade. As of the start of 1827, the Gregorian calendar was 12 days ahead of the Julian calendar, which remained in localized use until 1923.

== Events ==
=== January–March ===
- January 5 – The first regatta in Australia is held, taking place in Tasmania (called at the time Van Diemen's Land), on the River Derwent at Hobart.
- January 15 – Furman University, founded in 1826, begins its first classes with 10 students, as the Furman Academy and Theological Institution, located in Edgefield, South Carolina. By the end of 2016, it will have 2,800 students at its main campus in Greenville, South Carolina.
- January 27 – Author Johann Wolfgang von Goethe first elaborates on his vision of Weltliteratur (world literature), in a letter to Johann Peter Eckermann, declaring his belief that "poetry is the universal possession of mankind", and that "the epoch of world literature is at hand, and each must work to hasten its coming."
- January 30 – The first public theatre in Norway, the Christiania Offentlige Theater, is inaugurated in Christiania (modern-day Oslo).
- January – In Laos, King Anouvong of Vientiane leads the Laotian Rebellion against Siam and successfully attacks Nakhon Ratchasima (the Siamese later invade Vientiane and nearly destroy the whole city).
- February 20 – Battle of Ituzaingó (Passo do Rosário): A Brazilian Imperial Army force is tactically defeated on the border of Brazil and the United Provinces of the Río de la Plata by Argentine and Uruguayan troops.
- February 28 – The Baltimore and Ohio Railroad is incorporated, becoming the first railroad in the United States offering commercial transportation of both people and freight.
- March 7 – Brazilian marines sail up the Rio Negro and attack the temporary naval base of Carmen de Patagones, Argentina; they are defeated by the local citizens.
- March 11
  - The new state constitution for the Mexican state of Coahuila y Tejas is ratified, including a phasing-out of slavery in its Article 13, which declares that "From and after the promulgation of the constitution in the capital of each district, no one shall be born a slave in the state, and after six months the introduction of slaves under any pretext shall not be permitted." The prohibition of importing slaves from the United States is lifted when Texas declares independence in 1836, and the Republic of Texas Constitution will provide specifically that Africans and "the descendants of Africans" will not be considered "citizens of the republic".
  - The predecessor of Qasr El Eyni Hospital and Cairo University School of Medicine is established in Egypt under the direction of Antoine Clot as the first medical school in the region.
- March 15 – The University of Toronto is established by royal charter as King's College at York. It is the first institution of higher education in Upper Canada.
- March 16 – Freedom's Journal, the first African-American owned and published newspaper in the United States, is founded in New York City by John Russwurm.
- March 26 — Ludwig van Beethoven dies in Vienna at age 56. He died after a prolonged illness, with contemporaries reporting severe liver disease and months of declining health leading up to his final days
- March 29 — Thousands crowd the streets of Vienna to attend the funeral of Beethoven after his March 26 death. His contemporaries Franz Schubert, Johann Nepomuk Hummel and Carl Czerny serve as torchbearers and Chancellor Metternich speaks.

=== April–June ===
- April 7 – John Walker begins selling his invention, the "Lucifer" friction match, in England.
- April 8 – Battle of Monte Santiago: A squadron of the Brazilian Imperial Navy defeats Argentine vessels after a two-day naval battle.
- April 10 – George Canning succeeds Lord Liverpool as Prime Minister of the United Kingdom.
- April 23 – Scottish-born novelist John Galt founds the town of Guelph in Upper Canada.
- April 24 – Greek War of Independence: Battle of Phaleron – Ottoman troops defeat the Greek rebels.
- April 26 – The Royal Netherlands Navy's British-built paddle steamer Curaçao sets off on the first transatlantic crossing by steam, departing from Hellevoetsluis in the Netherlands to Paramaribo in the Netherlands South American colony of Dutch Guiana. The ship arrives after a voyage of four weeks.
- April 29 – The Fly Whisk Incident in Ottoman Algeria: Hussein Dey slaps French consul Pierre Deval on the face, eventually leading to the Invasion of Algiers in 1830.
- May 1 – Georg Ohm publishes Die galvanische Kette, mathematisch bearbeitet (tr., The Galvanic Circuit Investigated Mathematically) in which Ohm's law appears for the first time.
- May 20 – Zarafa, the first giraffe to be seen in Europe for over three centuries, arrives in Marseille as a gift from the Ottoman Viceroy of Egypt, Mehmet Ali Pasha, to King Charles X of France. The giraffe then begins a 50-day journey to Paris, walking with its handlers toward Paris where it will arrive on July 9.
- May 21 – The Maryland Democratic Party is founded by supporters of Andrew Jackson in Baltimore, and hosts its first meeting at the Baltimore Atheneum.
- May 24 – The Royal Netherlands Navy's British-built paddle steamer Curaçao completes the first transatlantic crossing by steam, arriving in Paramaribo in Dutch Guiana (now Suriname) four weeks after its April 26 departure from the Netherlands.
- May 25 – Romanian inventor Petrache Poenaru receives a French patent for the invention of the first fountain pen.
- June 4 – French inventor Joseph Niépce sends a package to Louis Daguerre revealing the existence of his invention, "heliography", where an image can be reproduced onto a pewter plate and then reprinted. In 1829, the two will begin a partnership, and Daguerre will perfect Niépce's photographic process to reproduce images more quickly.
- June 7 – Greek defenders in Athens surrender to Egyptian forces under the command of General Rashid Pasha.
- Between June 4–July 18 – In Saint-Loup-de-Varennes, France, Nicéphore Niépce makes the first photograph, View from the Window at Le Gras.

=== July–September ===
- July 6 – Greek War of Independence: The Treaty of London between France, Britain and Russia, demands that the Turks agree to an armistice in Greece.
- July 9 – Zarafa, the giraffe given by the Ottoman Viceroy of Egypt to King Charles X of France, arrives at the royal palace in Paris.
- July 14 – The Roman Catholic Diocese of Honolulu is founded in the Kingdom of Hawaii.
- August 31 – F. J. Robinson, 1st Viscount Goderich, becomes Prime Minister of the United Kingdom following the death of George Canning.
- September 4 – The Great Fire of Turku destroys three-quarters of the city (at this time Finland's largest), with 27 human casualties.
- September 20 – A petition for a land grant for 215 acres on the north bank of Rio Grande, just across from Paso del Norte (modern-day Ciudad Juárez), is approved; the first residence is built on what is modern-day El Paso, Texas.
- September 22 – Joseph Smith will claim in 1838 that on this day he took the golden plates from the place where they had been stored, and that he began writing down the Book of Mormon from them the following December.

=== October–December ===
- September 30 – Greek War of Independence: Battle of Itea, a naval battle fought in the Gulf of Corinth.
- October 1 – Russo-Persian War, 1826–1828: The Russians under Ivan Paskevich storm Yerevan, ending a millennium of Muslim domination in Armenia.
- October 20 – Greek War of Independence: Battle of Navarino – British, French and Russian naval forces destroy the Turko-Egyptian fleet in Greece. This is the last naval action to be fought under sail alone.
- November 24 – Voting is completed in elections for France's 430 member Chamber of Deputies. The Ultraroyalistes, supporters of King Charles X, lose their 233-seat majority and finish with 180 seats, the same number as the opposition Doctrinaires.
- November – The term "socialist" is coined by Robert Owen in his London periodical, The Co-operative Magazine and Monthly Herald.
- December 20 – Mexico passes its first "expulsion law", providing for citizens of Spain to be expelled within the next six months, and to remain barred from re-entry until the Kingdom of Spain recognizes Mexico's 1810 declaration of independence. Ultimately, because of all the exemptions within the expulsion act, only 1,779 of the 6,610 Spaniards are required to leave.

=== Date unknown ===
- The missionary ship Messenger of Peace is built on Rarotonga by English Congregationalist John Williams to spread Christianity to Samoa and the Society Islands on behalf of the London Missionary Society.
- John James Audubon begins publication of the 10-volume The Birds of America, in the United Kingdom.

== Births ==
=== January–June ===
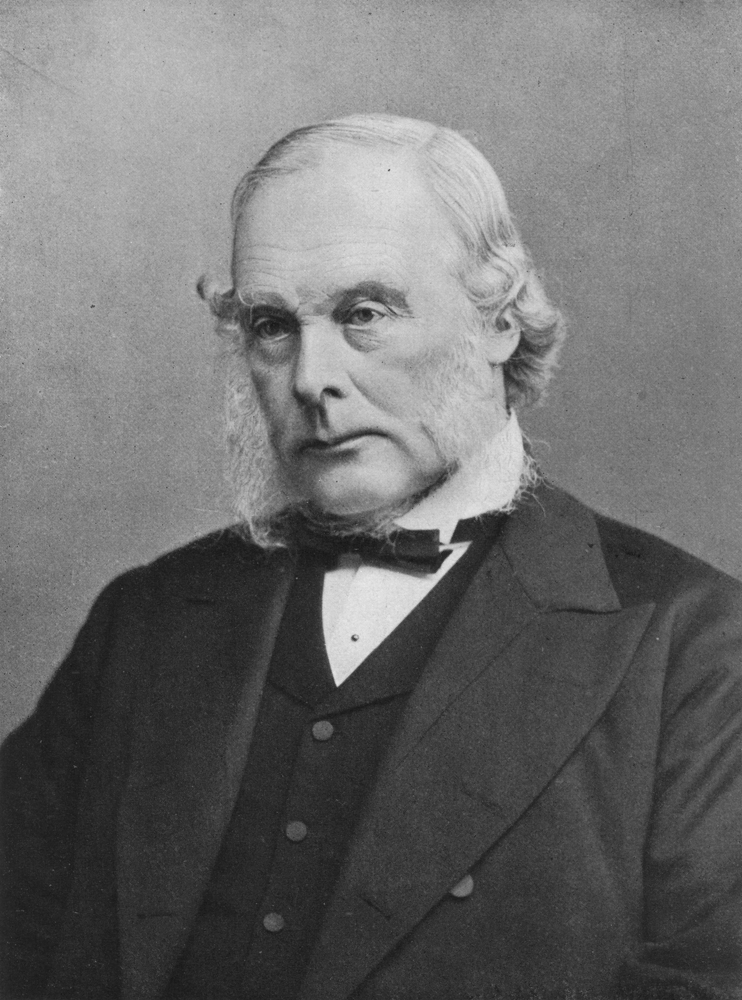
Joseph Lister

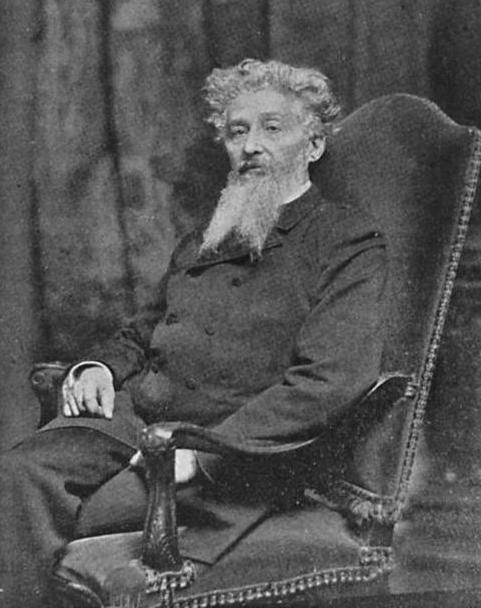
Ramón Emeterio Betances

- January 7 – Sir Sandford Fleming, Scottish-Canadian engineer, inventor (d. 1915)
- January 10 – Amanda Cajander, Finnish medical reformer (d. 1871)
- January 28 – Jean Antoine Villemin, French physician (d. 1892)
- February 17 – Elisabeth Blomqvist, Swedish-Finnish educator, feminist (d. 1901)
- March 7 – John Hall Gladstone, English chemist (d. 1902)
- March 8 – Wilhelm Bleek, German linguist (d. 1875)
- March 25 – Stephen Luce, American admiral (d. 1917)
- April 2 – William Holman Hunt, British Pre-Raphaelite painter (d. 1910)
- April 5 – Joseph Lister, English surgeon, medical pioneer (d. 1912)
- April 8 – Ramón Emeterio Betances, Puerto Rican politician, medical doctor and diplomat (d. 1898)
- May 11 – Jean-Baptiste Carpeaux, French sculptor, painter (d. 1875)
- May 19 – Paul-Armand Challemel-Lacour, French statesman (d. 1896)
- May 21 – William P. Sprague, American politician from Ohio (d. 1899)
- May 27 – Samuel F. Miller, American politician (d. 1892)
- May 31 – Frederic Thesiger, 2nd Baron Chelmsford, British general (d. 1905)
- June 11 – Natalie Zahle, Danish educator, women's rights activist (d. 1913)
- June 12 – Johanna Spyri, Swiss author (d. 1901)
- June 13 – Alberto Henschel, German-Brazilian photographer, businessman (d. 1882)
- June 24 – Louis Brière de l'Isle, French general (d. 1897)
- June 26 – Amédée Courbet, French admiral (d. 1885)

=== July–December ===
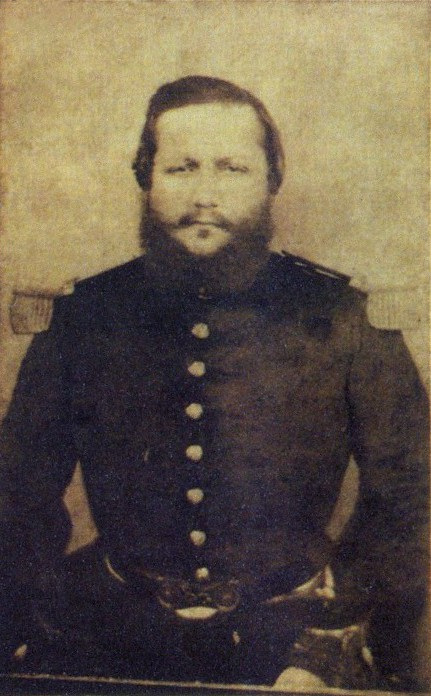
Francisco Solano López

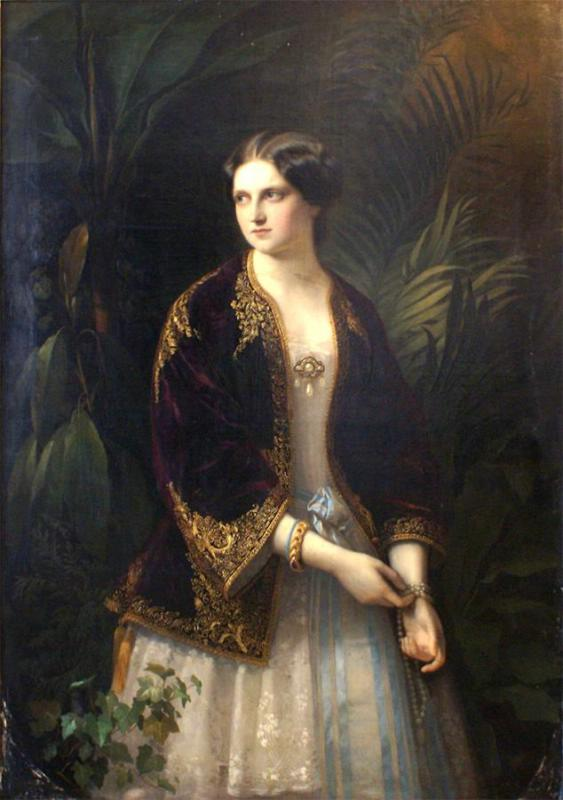
Grand Duchess Catherine Mikhailovna of Russia

Ellen G. White

- July 17 – Sir Frederick Augustus Abel, British chemist (d. 1902)
- July 18 – Mangal Pandey, Indian soldier (d. 1857)
- July 24 – Francisco Solano López, President of Paraguay (d. 1870)
- August 5 – Deodoro da Fonseca, 1st President of Brazil (d. 1892)
- August 23 – Lord John Hay, British admiral and politician (d. 1916)
- August 28 – Grand Duchess Catherine Mikhailovna of Russia, granddaughter of Tsar Paul I (d. 1894)
- September 3 – John Drew Sr., Irish-American stage actor, manager (d. 1862)
- September 27 – Georgiana Archer, German (originally Scottish) women's rights activist and educator (d. 1882)
- September 30 – Ellis H. Roberts, American politician (d. 1918)
- October 12 – Josiah Parsons Cooke, American chemist (d. 1894)
- October 16 – Arnold Böcklin, Swiss painter (d. 1901)
- October 25 – Marcellin Berthelot, French chemist (d. 1907)
- October 29 – Antonio Borrero, 10th President of Ecuador (d. 1911)
- November 1 – Friedrich Haase, German actor (d. 1911)
- November 7 – Antti Ahlström, Finnish industrialist (d. 1896)
- November 18 – Mehmed Ali Pasha, Prussian-born Ottoman military leader (d. 1878)
- November 26 – Ellen G. White, American religious leader, cofounder of the Seventh-day Adventist Church (d. 1915)
- November 29 – William Crichton, Scottish engineer and shipbuilder (d. 1889)
- December 3
  - Jain Acharya Rajendrasuri, Indian religious reformer (d. 1906)
  - Lombe Atthill, Northern Irish obstetrician and gynaecologist (d. 1910)
- December 17 – Baron Alexander Wassilko von Serecki, Governor of the Duchy of Bucovina, member of the Herrenhaus (d. 1893)
- December 23 – Wilhelm von Tegetthoff, Austrian admiral (d. 1871)
- December 27 – Stanisław Mieroszewski, Polish-born politician, writer, historian and member of the Imperial Council of Austria (d. 1900)

=== Undated ===
- Wazir Beg, Indian Semitic scholar and Presbyterian minister (d. 1885)

== Deaths ==
=== January–June ===
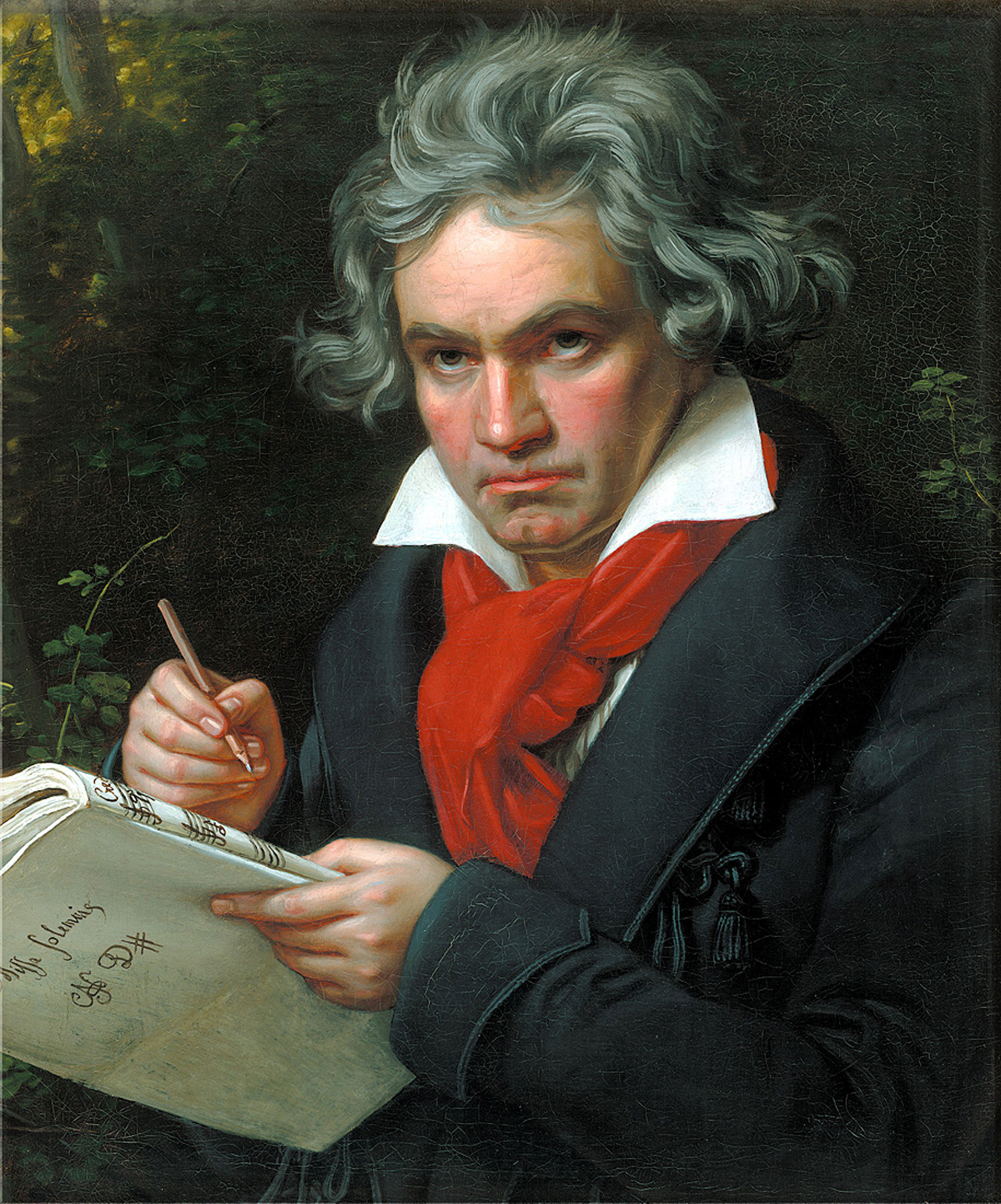
Ludwig van Beethoven

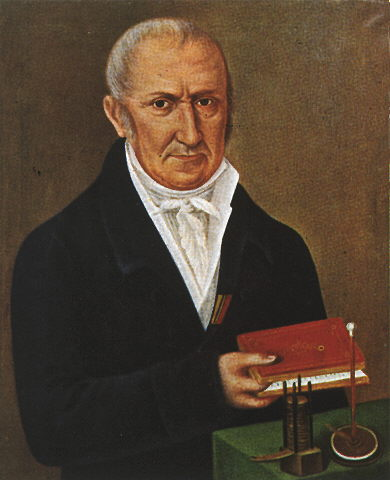
Alessandro Volta

- January 5 – Prince Frederick, Duke of York and Albany, heir-presumptive to the British throne (b. 1763)
- January 19 – Ludwig von Brauchitsch, Prussian general (b. 1757)
- February 13 – Caleb Brewster, Patriot spy during the American Revolutionary War (b. 1747)
- February 19 – Armand Augustin Louis de Caulaincourt, French general, diplomat (b. 1773)
- February 23 – Felipe Enrique Neri, Texas legislator, colonizer (b. 1759)
- February 17 – Johann Heinrich Pestalozzi, Swiss pedagogue (b. 1746)
- February 28 – Thomas Holloway, English portrait painter, engraver (b. 1748)
- March 5
  - Pierre-Simon Laplace, French mathematician (b. 1749)
  - Alessandro Volta, Italian physicist (b. 1745)
- March 26 – Ludwig van Beethoven, German composer (b. 1770)
- March 31 – Marie Barch, Danish ballerina (b. 1744)
- April 12 – Michele Troja, Italian physician (b. 1747)
- April 29
  - Deborah Sampson, first American female soldier (b. 1760)
  - Rufus King, American lawyer, politician and diplomat (b. 1755)
- May 5 – Frederick Augustus I of Saxony (b. 1750)
- May 27 – Melesina Trench, Irish-born writer, socialite (b. 1768)
- June 26 – Samuel Crompton, English inventor (b. 1753)

=== July–December ===
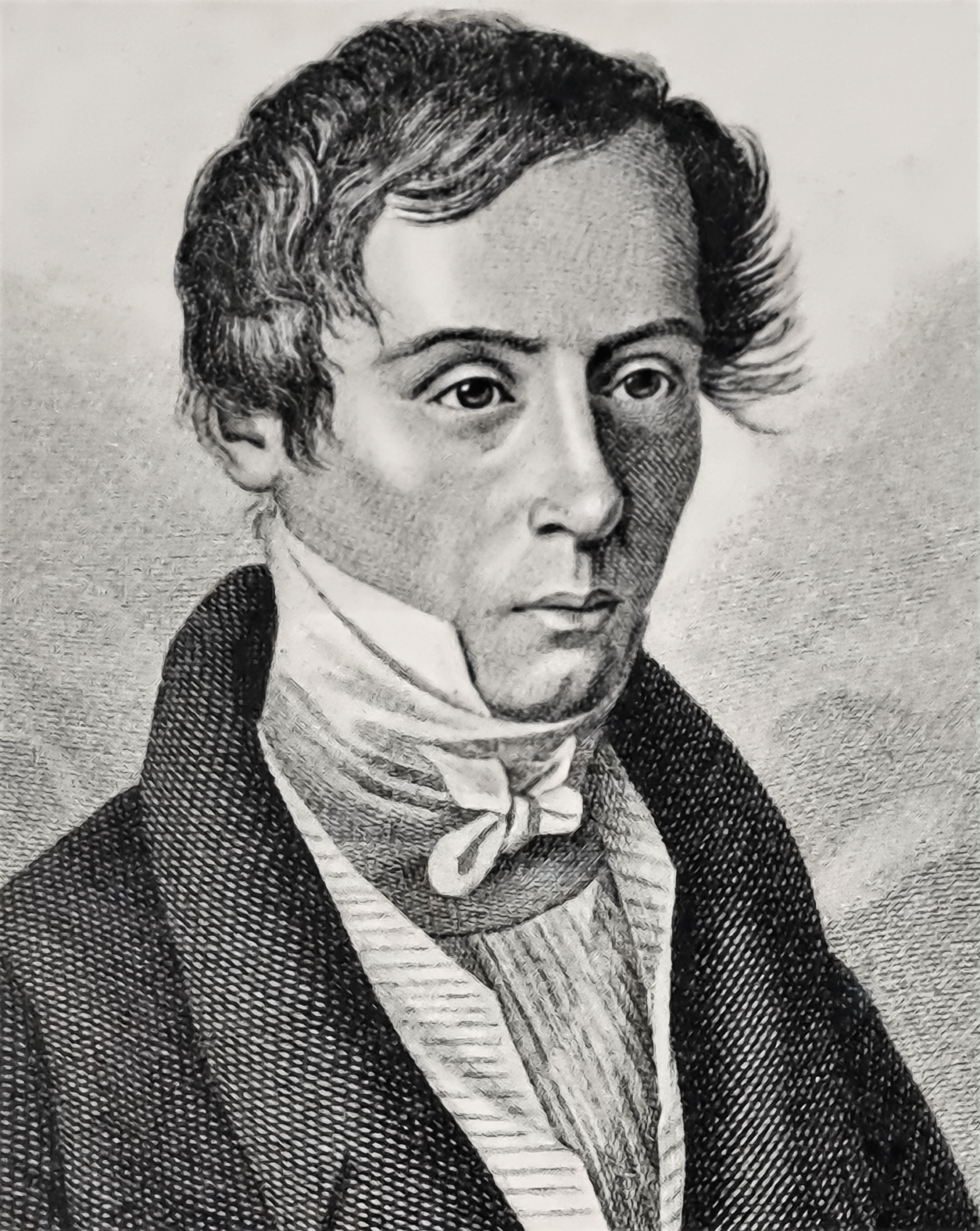
Augustin-Jean Fresnel

- July 14 – Augustin-Jean Fresnel, French physicist (b. 1788)
- July 27 – Fredrique Eleonore Baptiste, Finnish actress and playwright
- August 8 – George Canning, Prime Minister of the United Kingdom (b. 1770)
- August 12 – William Blake, English poet and artist (b. 1757)
- September 10 – Ugo Foscolo, Greek-born Italian writer, revolutionary and poet (b. 1778)
- October 12 – John Eager Howard, American politician (b. 1752)
- November 7 – Maria Theresia of Tuscany, Queen of Saxony (b. 1767)
- November 10 – St. George Tucker, United States federal judge (b. 1752)
- December 3 – Servando Teresa de Mier, Mexican preacher (b. 1765)
- December 21 – Anton II, Catholicos Patriarch of Georgia (b. 1762)
