= Battle of Bajíos de Arregui =

1828 Cisplatine War naval battle

- Part of the Cisplatine War
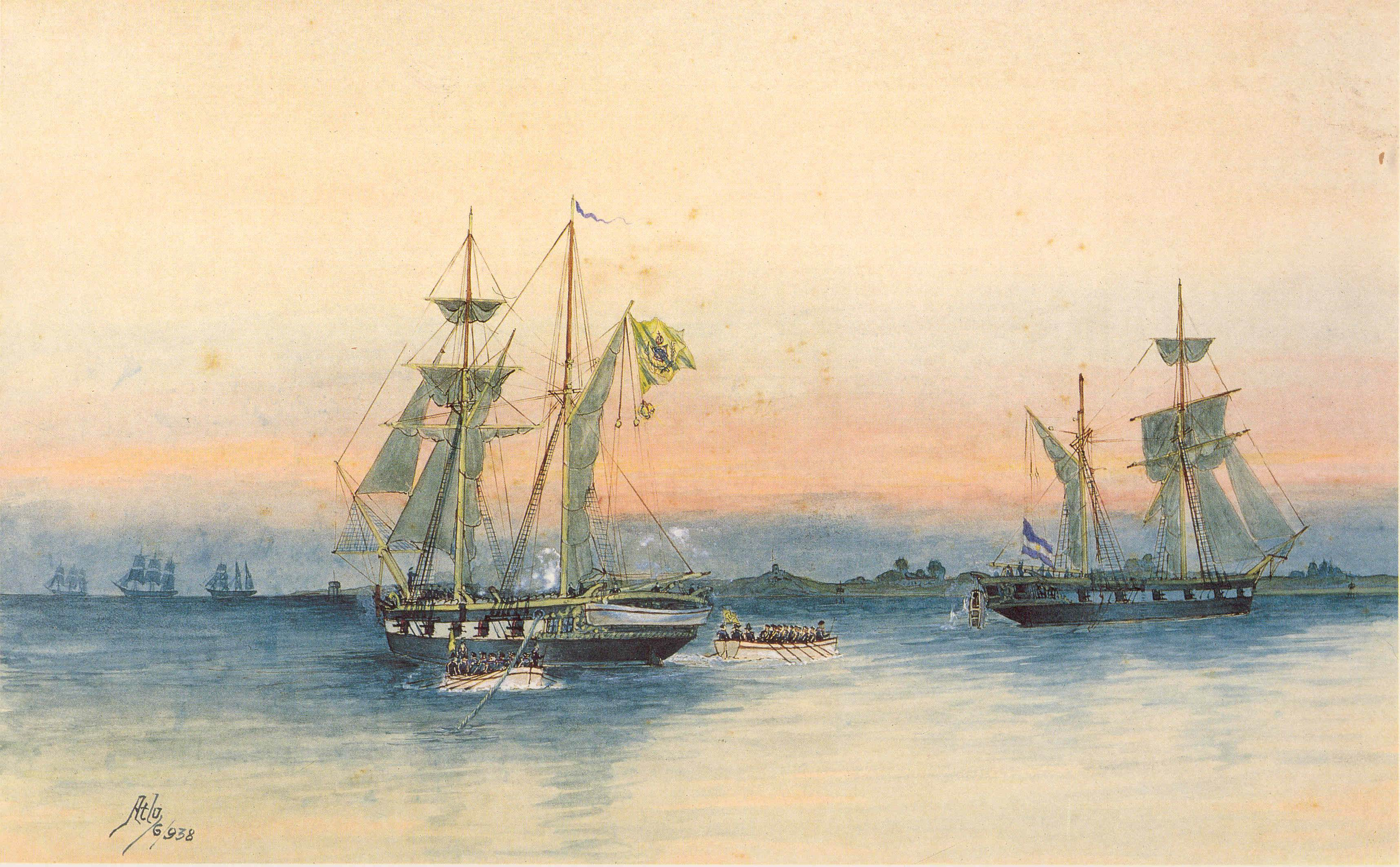
- Combate naval de Arregui-Tuyu entre o Brasil e a Argentina em 1828, by Trajano Augusto de Carvalho
Date	May 29-30, 1828
Location	Samborombón Bay, Argentina
Result	Brazilian victory

Belligerents
Empire of Brazil	(Argentina) United Provinces

Commanders and leaders
João das Botas	Tomás Espora

Strength
2 corvettes 1 brig 4 schooners 1 lugger 2 gunboats Total guns: 129	1 brig Total guns: 10

Casualties and losses
Unknown	1 brig captured 25 dead or missing 8 men captured 38 wounded total

The Battle of Bajíos de Arregui was a naval battle fought between an Argentine corsair and a Brazilian fleet during the Cisplatine War's closing months. After a long and one-sided engagement, the Argentine ship surrendered.

== Lead-up to battle ==
Back from a corsair raid in the Brazilian coast, the brig 8 de Febrero under Tomás Espora neared Buenos Aires in a dense fog, when it stumbled upon part of the Brazilian fleet blockading the city, which, according to Argentine sources, was made of 10 ships in total, armed with around 129 guns and 1,200 men to the brig's 10 guns and 69 men. Brazilian sources claim the part of the blockading fleet which engaged the Argentine brig was composed of only two gunboats, a schooner, and a brig.

The 8 de Febrero was quickly spotted by the enemy, who fired at it on sight. Espora ordered the ship to go towards the Bajíos de Arregui, a shallow area nearby, to keep the Brazilian ships from approaching; his brig had a lower keel than the larger Imperial ships. However, maneuvering thus, the brig ran aground and got stuck.

Determined to fight, Espora shouted to his men: "Boys! There is the enemy, and though our forces are unequal, let us show them that we are worthy of the glorious name which this ship bears. (Note: 8 de Febrero stands for February 8, the date when the Battle of Juncal was fought; it was the greatest Argentine naval victory in the war.) To our gunners, I advise you to aim, and to all, have the greatest discipline, for I will be ruthless with any of you who part with it; in exchange, I swear on this sword and in the presence of the Sun of May, that if the bullets respect my life as they have before, I will not rest until I have obtained, from the government, generous rewards to the families of those who fall defending our national honor. Sailors and soldiers of the 8 de Febrero: only cowards surrender without fighting, and here, I can see only Argentines and republicans. Fellows, light up your fuzes and hail the motherland!" (Note: This is a translation from the original Spanish, which reads "¡Ea muchachos!, ahí está el enemigo, y aunque nuestras fuerzas sean desiguales, vamos a enseñarles que somos dignos de mantener el nombre glorioso que lleva este buque. A los artilleros recomiendo la puntería, y a todos la mayor disciplina, porque seré inexorable con el que la quebrante; pero en cambio, os juro sobre esta espada y en presencia del Sol de Mayo, que si las balas respetan mi vida como otras veces, no descansaré hasta obtener que el gobierno premie con mano generosa a las familias de los que caigan en defensa de la honra nacional. Marinos y soldados del 8 de Febrero: sólo los cobardes se rinden sin pelear, y aquí, no reconozco sino argentinos y republicanos. Compañeros, arrimen las mechas y ¡Viva la Patria!")

== Engagement and aftermath ==
The Brazilian commander João das Botas, seeing the absurd disadvantage the Argentine ship was in, bid it to surrender. Espora refused and combat started, lasting for 10 hours, until the 8 de Febrero had exhausted its 900 cannon shots and all its powder, being reduced to, at the end, firing the crewmen's clothes which had been balled up. By this point, the brig had suffered 25 dead and lost, 4 guns dismantled and great hull damage.

Now, by nightfall, Espora had a raft built with whatever the brig could spare, and sent 38 survivors of the engagement, all wounded, to land, together with the ship's doctor and an officer. It took them until 7 June to arrive. Espora remained aboard with his second-in-command, Antonio Toll y Bernadet, four men too gravely wounded to be moved, and two aides. Only then he surrendered the ship. A boat was sent towards the 8 de Febrero with a junior officer, the future Admiral Tamandaré, who was hailed by Espora jokingly; the Argentine commander said he could come close in safety, for "he did not have enough gunpowder to light a cigarrete with, and all their cannons were spiked".

Both Argentine officers were taken to Botas, who, impressed with their valour, would later request to Admiral Guedes that they be swapped with the Argentines. This request was accepted, something unusual, given that the Brazilian policy was not to do prisoner swaps. On June 10 Espora and Toll left Montevideo aboard the corvette Liberal. Three days later, the 30 de Julio swapped them for William Eyre, who had been captured in the San Blas Expedition, and Antonio Carlos Ferreira, captured in 1826 when his gunboat was taken by a corsair.

The 8 de Febrero was unstuck on June 3, and reincorporated into the Brazilian fleet.
