= Villalonga (disambiguation) =

Villalonga is a municipality in the Valencian Community, Spain.

Villalonga may also refer to:

- Villalonga, Buenos Aires, an Argentine town
- Villalonga FC, a Galician football club
- Gabriel Alomar i Villalonga (1873–1941), Spanish poet, essayist and educator
- José Villalonga Llorente (1919–1973), Spanish football manager
- Juan Villalonga (born 1953), Spanish businessman
- Luc Villalonga (born 1970), French footballer
- Marthe Villalonga (born 1932), French actress
- Pau Villalonga (died 1609), Spanish composer

== See also ==
- Jorge de Villalonga (born 1664), Spanish lawyer, general and viceroy
- Llorenç Villalonga i Pons (1897–1980), Balearic writer and psychiatrist
- de Vilallonga (disambiguation)
