= Juan. A Pradere =

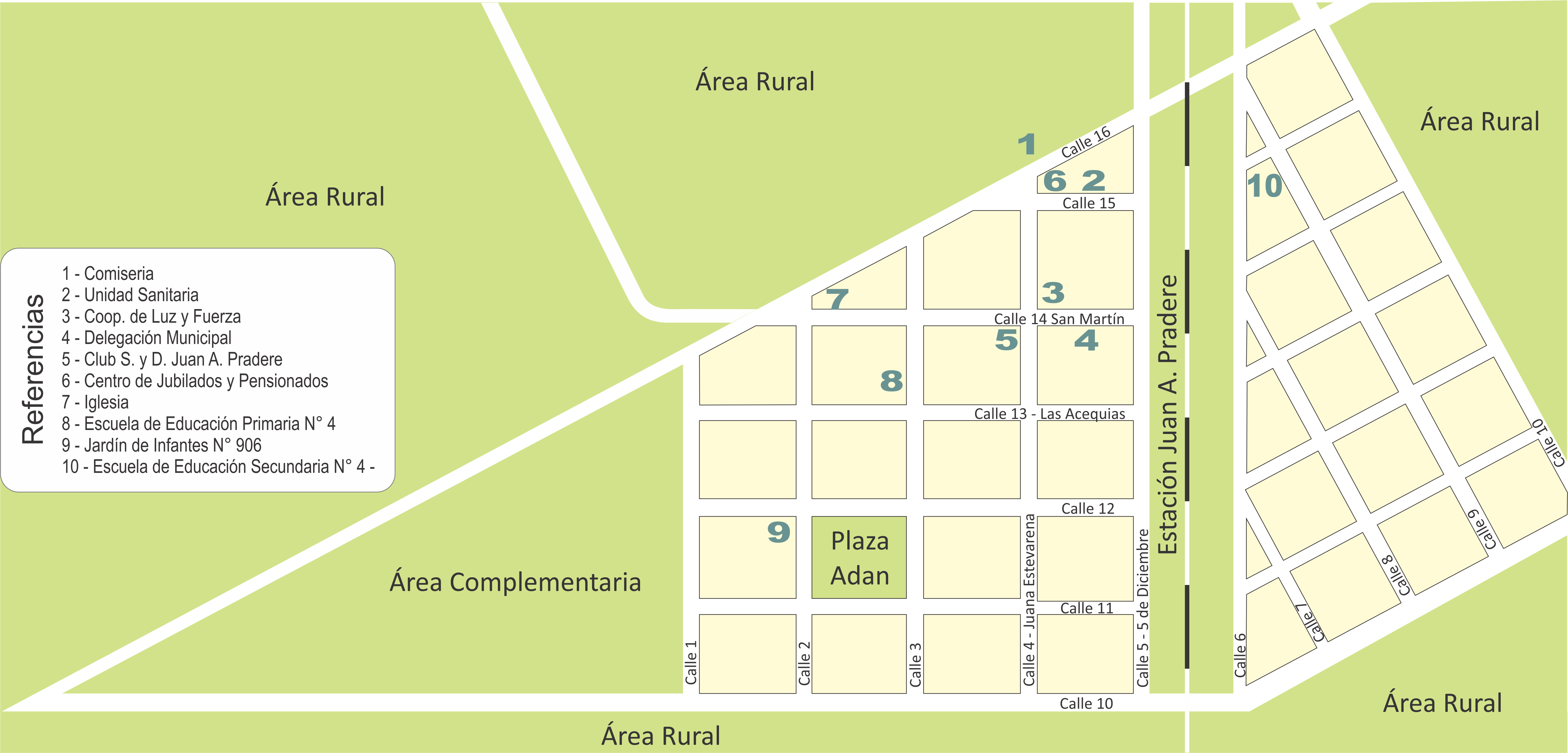
- Map of Juan A. Pradere

- Location in Argentina
- Coordinates: 39°35′59″S 62°39′8″W
- Country: Argentina
- Province: Buenos Aires Province
- Partido: Patagones Partido

Area
  - Total: 0.53 km^{2} (0.20 sq mi)
- Elevation: 19 m (62 ft)

Population (2010)
  - Total: 521

Gender
  - Male: 263
  - Female: 258

Juan. A Paradere is a city in Buenos Aires Province, Argentina near La Plata and La Pampa Province.
