= De Vilallonga =

de Vilallonga is a surname. Notable people with the surname include:

- Jesús Carles de Vilallonga (1927-2018), Catalan painter and sculptor
- José Luis de Vilallonga (1920–2007), Spanish actor and writer
- Rafaela Ybarra de Vilallonga (1843–1900), Beatified Spanish Catholic

== See also ==
- Martín Vilallonga
- Villalonga (disambiguation)
