= Battle of Jaguarí =

Naval confrontation in the Paraguayan War

- Part of the Corrientes campaign
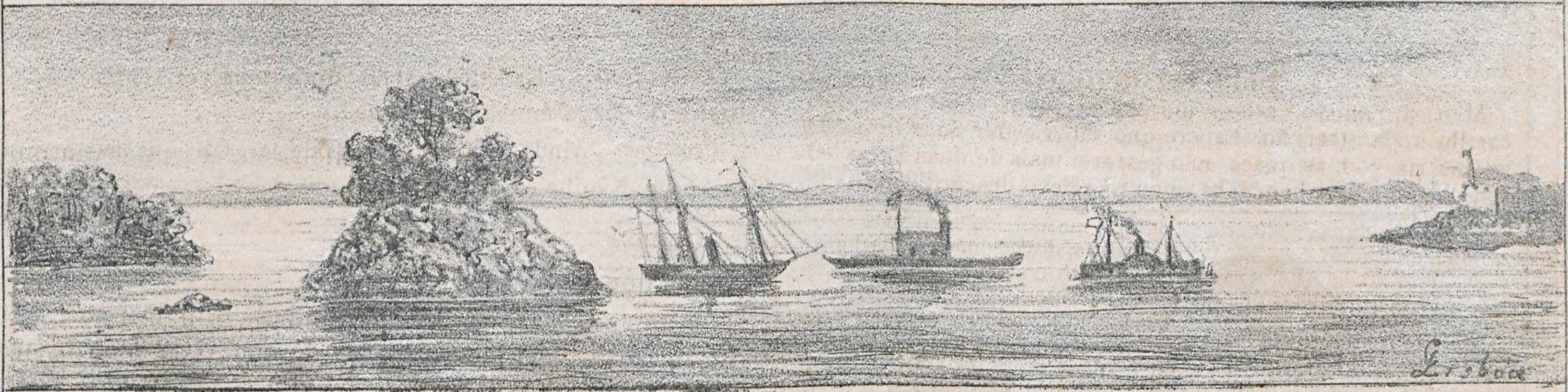
- Imperial Navy float on the Jaguarí River
Date	March 23, 1866
Location	Paraná River, Argentina and Paraguay
Result	Brazilian Victory

Belligerents
Paraguay	Empire of Brazil

Commanders and leaders
Unknown	Joaquim Marques Lisboa

Strength
1 Steamboat; 1 Flat-bottomed boat	1 Ironclad; 3 Corvettes

Casualties and losses
Unknown	1 ship damaged

The Battle of Jaguarí was a naval confrontation in the Paraguayan War between Brazilian and Paraguayan flotillas, which took place on March 23, 1866, at the mouth of the Jaguari River, Paraná River. At the time, aboard the steamer Cisnei, were admiral Joaquim Marques Lisboa and generals Osório, Mitre and Flores. The ship was escorted by the ironclad Tamandaré and the gunboats Beberibe and Henrique Martins, and was on a reconnaissance mission on the Paraná River to the mouth of Jaguari. However, at eleven o'clock in the morning, the Paraguayan steamer Gualeguai and a towed boat found the Brazilian flotilla in Jaguari and immediately started bombing them, without causing damage. Only Tamandaré ran aground on the island of Itapiru. Despite the confrontation, the region's recognition proved to be useful to the allies, as the future location for the landing of the Triple Alliance troops that would initiate the invasion of Paraguayan territory was defined.
