= San Blas Expedition =

1827 Cisplatine War battle

- Part of Cisplatine War
| Date | 14–22 September 1827 |
| Location | San Blas Bay, Argentina 40°27′6″S 62°18′44″W |
| Result | United Provinces victory |

Belligerents
| (Argentina) United Provinces | Empire of Brazil |

Commanders and leaders
| None | William Eyre |

Strength
| None | 1 corvette 2 brigs |

Casualties and losses
| None | 1 corvette lost 1 brig lost 40–50 men drowned 83 men captured |

The San Blas Expedition was an incursion by the Empire of Brazil during the Cisplatine War on the San Blas Bay to the southeast of Buenos Aires amidst the Brazilian blockade of the Río de la Plata. The expedition was a failure mainly due to a combination of a shallow seafloor and strong tides, leading to massive losses amongst the Brazilian force.

== Background ==
In February 1827 the Cisplatine War was unfolding in an unfavourable manner to Brazil, despite the country's superiority in resources and the continued maintenance of the blockade to Buenos Aires. The loss of the Imperial third naval division at Juncal, combined with the defeat on land at Ituzaingó and a failed expedition to Carmen de Patagones all signaled poorly for the conflict's prospects to the Empire. The maintenance of that country's war efforts was hampered by an organized Argentine privateer force which constantly challenged the Brazilian blockade and threteaned the country's commerce and its shores.

After the defeat at Carmen de Patagones, Captain William Eyre, the expedition's second in command, was imprisoned by the Argentines and months later managed to escape by taking control of the prison ship Anna. Once back on land, Eyre warned his superiors that in the San Blas Bay ships were equipped and supplied to serve as privateers, amongst them the merchant frigate Condessa da Ponte, later renamed Gaviota. San Blas Bay was known as the Portão do Inferno (Gate to Hell), due to its treacherous waters and sandbanks.

On 16 September, a naval force under Eyre was sent to the bay aiming to destroy or capture the Gaviota specifically. It was composed of the corvette Maceió and two brigs, the Caboclo and the Independência ou Morte.

== Expedition and aftermath ==
On 20 September, approaching the bay, both the Maceió and the Independência ou Morte got stuck in sandbanks, though they eventually managed to sail away undamaged. On the next day, both ships got stuck again, but did not manage to clear the banks, and were then destroyed by strong tides during the nights of the 21st and 22nd of September.

40 or 50 men drowned and 83 managed to deboard the ships and surrender to the Argentine garrison at Patagones, Eyre amongst them. Only 22 men from the Maceió and 19 from the Independência ou Morte were rescued by the Caboclo. Joaquim Marques Lisboa, then a junior officer, was present in this action.
