= Stroeder =

- Town
- Location within Buenos Aires Province
- Coordinates: 40°11′09″S 62°37′12″W
- Country: Argentina
- Province: Buenos Aires
- Partidos: Patagones
- Established: November 11, 1913
- Elevation: 29 m (95 ft)

Population (2001 Census)
  - Total: 1,975
- Time zone: UTC−3 (ART)
- CPA Base: B 8508
- Climate: Dfc

Stroeder is a town located in the Patagones Partido in the province of Buenos Aires, Argentina.

== History ==
The land that would become Stroeder was first settled in 1905, however rail service to the town would not begin until 6 years later in 1911. The town's founding date is considered to have been November 11, 1913. The town's founder, Hugo Stroeder, a German immigrant who founded various communities across central Argentina, became the town's namesake. Stroeder was first settled by Volga Germans.

Stroeder's economy is primarily based on farming, which leaves the town vulnerable to droughts. In 2009, a large drought in the region destroyed virtually all of the town's harvest and killed hundreds of livestock.

== Population ==
According to INDEC, which collects population data for the country, the town had a population of 1,975 people as of the 2001 census.
