= Battle of Carmen de Patagones =

Battle in Cisplatine War

- Part of Cisplatine War
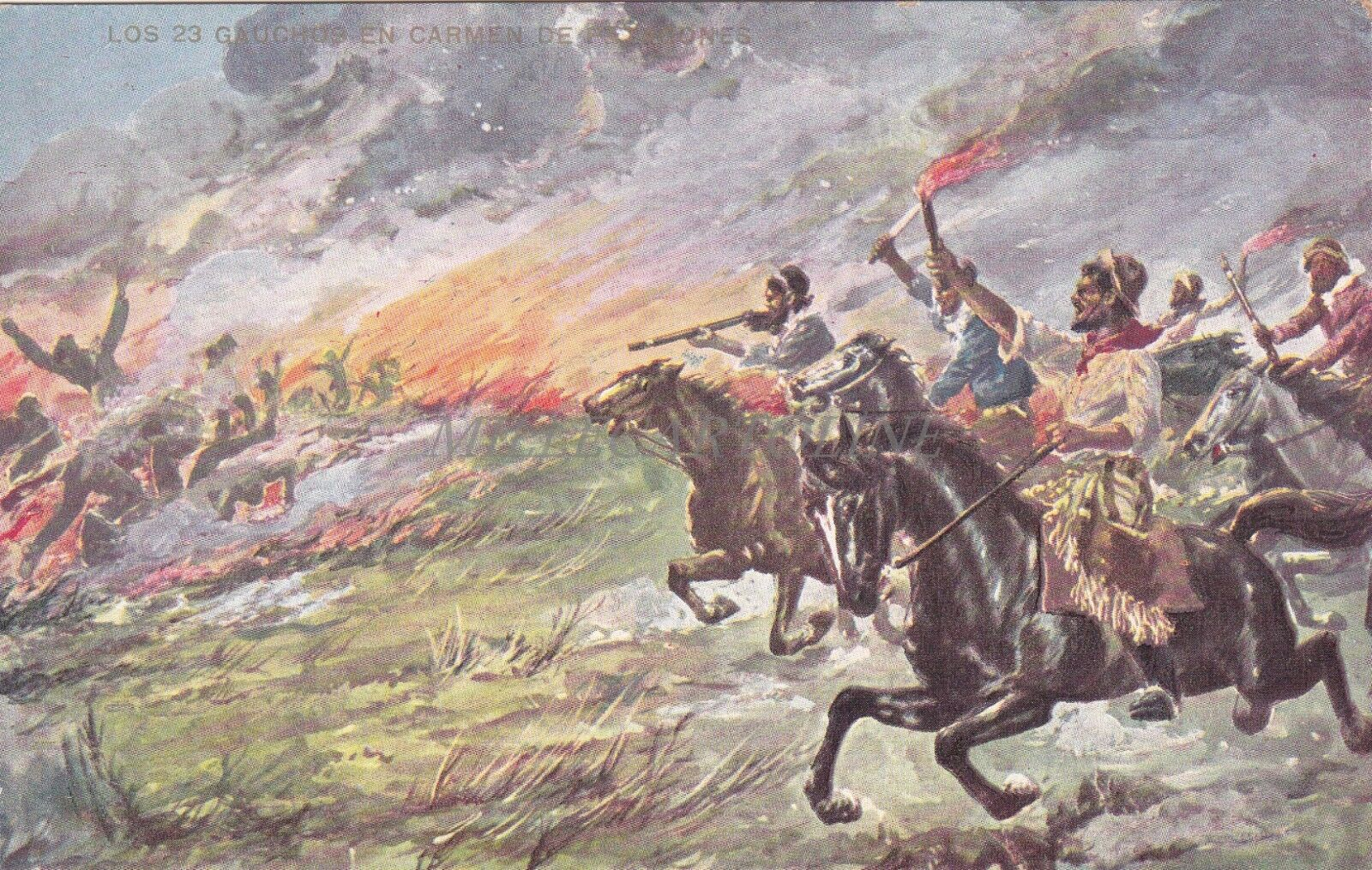
Date	7 March 1827
Location	Carmen de Patagones, Argentina 40°48′40″S 62°58′9″W
Result	United Provinces victory

Belligerents
(Argentina) United Provinces	Empire of Brazil

Commanders and leaders
Martín Lacarra; Santiago Jorge Bynnon; Sebastián Olivera	James Shepherd †; William Eyre (POW); Joaquim M. Lisboa (POW)

Strength
Ships: 1 brigantine 1 smack 2 schooners 2 corsair whalers ~500 men and militiamen	Ships: 2 corvettes 1 brigantine 1 schooner 654 men

Casualties and losses
4 dead 13 wounded 4 cannons destroyed	100 dead and wounded 1 corvette sunk 3 ships and 28 cannons captured 579 prisoners

The Battle of Carmen de Patagones was a confrontation that occurred on March 7, 1827 between militias of the United Provinces of the Río de la Plata and troops from the Imperial Brazilian Navy, during the course of the Cisplatine War. It took place around the town of Carmen de Patagones, in southern Buenos Aires Province, in today's Argentina.

== Background ==
To counter the overwhelming Brazilian naval superiority, the United Provinces of the Río de la Plata resorted to giving away letters of marque, in order to harass the imperial trade and transport by sea. This way, the Carmen de Patagones fort became a safe haven for corsairs, where they could land their spoils of war, repair ships, rest and stock up on food.

For this reason, the Brazilian admiral Pinto Guedes outlined a plan to attack the fort and take the town, in order to punish the corsairs and stop their attacks. Furthermore, this would allow the possibility of opening a second front to attack Buenos Aires from the south, thus dividing the republican armies.

The Carmen de Patagones fort was the southernmost of the Argentine territory and its possession implied an important strategic advantage for the invading imperial forces.

== Opposing forces ==
=== Imperial forces ===
In order to fulfill the objective of taking the town, the Imperial Navy sent a division under the command of the English frigate captain James Shepherd. This force consisted of the following vessels:

- The corvette Duqueza de Goyas, commanded by Shepherd.
- The corvette Itaparica, commanded by William Eyre.
- The brig Escudeiro, commanded by Luis Pouthier.
- The schooner Constança, under the command of Joaquim Marques Lisboa.

The force consisted of slightly more than 650 men, 200 of whom were non-Brazilian.

=== Argentine forces ===
Since Carmen de Patagones was too far from the main theater of operations, there were not enough troops available to defend the main square. The fort's commander, Martín Lacarra, had a hundred infantrymen, and managed to recruit about 80 men on horseback, mostly gauchos, plus the privateers and an artillery picket from one of the ships under repair, the Chacabuco. This was later joined by a group of black volunteers and a squad of neighbors. In addition, the inhabitants of Patagones, the majority of which were women, were provided with sticks, hats and militia clothes, trying to simulate a column in the rear.

This "rearguard" occupied visible positions in the fort, pretending that the Argentine forces would resist in that place, without going out to fight. This contributed in a fundamental way to the surprise effect used by the Argentine troops in the battle, since the spies sent by the Imperials reported this situation to their leaders, who were surprised when they wanted to overcome the small Cerro de la Caballada, named after the horse charge with which the Argentines defeated the invaders.

As for the fleet, it was made up of:

- The smack Bella Flor, under the command of Welshman officer Santiago Jorge Bynnon
- The brigantine Oriental Argentino, under the command of the French privateer Pedro Dautant.
- The corsair whalers Hijo de Mayo and Hijo de Julio, commanded by Englishman James Harris and Frenchman Francisco Fourmantin, respectively.
- The schooners Emperatriz and Chiquita; these had recently been captured from the Brazilians.

In total, the number of men embarked was approximately 330, 250 of which were non-Argentines.

== Battle ==
=== First actions ===
On the morning of February 28, 1827, the brigantine Escudeiro entered the Río Negro, waving an American flag to deceive the defenders. At the entrance to the estuary there was a 4-gun battery under the command of Colonel Felipe Pereyra, beginning the exchange of fire. After overcoming the defenses in the skirmish, the Escudeiro crossed the entrance, followed by the Itaparica corvette.

On March 3, the Duqueza de Goyas was lost, which had been stranded days before due to the nature of the river and the great draft of the ship. This produced 38 casualties among the invaders.

On March 6, 1827, the Brazilians landed a group of men on the southern bank and demanded fresh meat from a Creole scouting group, but the justice of the peace Fernando Alfaro gave orders to deny them support.

=== Brazilian landing ===
Due to the difficulties in navigating the river, the Brazilian commander decided to attack Patagones by land. At dawn there was a general landing of the Brazilian forces, around 350 men, in order to march on the town to take it definitively.

The Brazilian column began the march on the hot night of the 7th, having to do so through sandy terrain covered with thick thorny bushes, which forced the officers to be transported on their soldiers' shoulders. They also had the additional difficulty of not having a competent guide, which led to the column, made up of more than 400 troops, getting lost during the march, moving away from the river and water sources. This fact, added to the suffocating heat and the desert terrain, began to undermine the forces and resistance of the imperial soldiers.

The invading forces arrived at the Cerro de la Caballada at 6:30 a.m., completely exhausted and deprived of drinking water for a day, with the aggravation that the only food they could consume was salty meat.

=== Battle of Cerro de la Caballada ===
The defenders, unaware of the location and intentions of the imperial column, discovered the tracks of the Brazilian advance and began preparations for the defense. On the Cerro de la Caballada, the republican militias led by Second Lieutenant Sebastián Olivera and the gauchos of the baqueano José Luis Molina caught up with them and immediately presented battle. With the first shots the Brazilian commander Shepherd fell dead and was supplanted by William Eyre. Soon they were surrounded by guerrillas who proceeded to encircle the Imperial forces, setting fire to the vegetation, a fact that forced Eyre to order a withdrawal to the ships, without noticing that they already had been taken over by the Argentines.

=== Capture of the ships and end of the battle ===
Indeed, the flotilla of corsair ships under the command of Santiago Jorge Bynon opened fire on the Escudeiro, which resisted until the moment its hard-working captain fell mortally wounded. Taking that ship, the Argentines attacked the schooner Constanza, which had separated from the Escudeiro to join the corvette Itaparica, which was eventually overpowered.

The Itaparica was sunk off the town of Carmen de Patagones. Remains of her hull are still buried in the bed of the Negro river in that place, and her huge flag was exposed for more than one and a half century, being in recent years on one side of the atrium of the town's church. In the 1990s, the Argentine government decided to return that flag belonging to the Itaparica to Brazil, as a sign of goodwill, but the "maragato" people (name of the inhabitants of Carmen de Patagones) strongly opposed. This and another flag captured in that same battle are still exhibited in the colonial church of the town, in front of the Plaza 7 de Marzo.

Upon confirmation of the surrender of his squad, Eyre finally surrendered to Alfaro, who was chosen along with other men to bring the news of the victory to Buenos Aires.

=== Escape of Brazilian prisoners ===
165 British prisoners changed sides and volunteered to serve Argentina. The young Joaquim Marques Lisboa and Eyre, at the head of 93 prisoners, orchestrated a daring escape: they managed to seize control of the Republican ship Ana carrying them to Salado and returned - despite the presence of escort ships - to Montevideo in triumph. Eyre was taken prisoner once again in September 1827, when he led an expedition to San Blas Bay, roughly 65 kilometres (40 mi) northeast of Carmen de Patagones. Strong tides and unexpected shallows provoked the loss of the main ships; the survivors handed themselves over to the Argentine garrison in Carmen de Patagones.

== Consequences ==
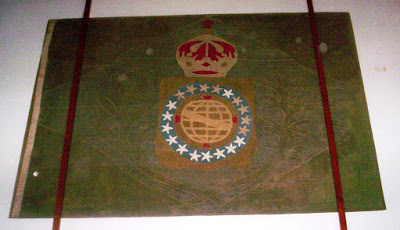
The smaller of the two captured imperial flags on display in Carmen de Patagones.

As a result of the fighting, 3 ships, 28 guns and numerous weapons were left in the hands of the Argentines. The landing troops lost 40 of their own and 10 officers and 306 troopers surrendered in the ships. In total, the Brazilian forces suffered 100 casualties and 579 prisoners were taken, including 200 British, 165 of whom went on to swell the Argentine ranks.

The captured ships were renamed and joined Admiral Brown's squadron. The Itaparica was renamed Ituzaingó, the Escudeiro became the Patagones and the Constanza was renamed Juncal.

Two of the seven Brazilian imperial flags that were conquered on March 7, 1827 are preserved in the Nuestra Señora del Carmen church. The seven conquered flags are also displayed in the town's coat of arms. Furthermore, a monument was built on the Cerro de la Caballada in 1927 to commemorate the Argentine victory.
