= Wazir Beg =

Semitic scholar (1827–1885)

- Born: 1827; Pune, Maharashtra, India
- Died: 4 January 1885 (aged 57–58)
- Occupations: academic; Orangeman; Presbyterian minister; religious writer; Semitic scholar; missionary
- Spouse: Margaret Robertson
- Children: 5

Wazir Beg (1827–1885) was a Semitic scholar, linguist, religious writer, Presbyterian minister and controversialist.

== Early life and education ==
Wazir was born in Pune, Maharashtra, India into a Muslim family. His parents were devout Muslims, and he received a typical Muslim middle-class education.

== Life ==
In 1842, Wazir converted to Christianity but kept his faith secret out of concern for how it would impact his family. He declined the position of headmaster at Dhanwar Government School because he was secretly a Christian.

Beg completed his theological studies in 1853 and was licensed in 1854. The following year he moved to Scotland, where he enrolled in medical studies at the University of Edinburgh (although his name was not found in the university's records). He became a Fellow of the Medical College, London, in 1861, and is said to have obtained medical qualifications in Erlangen in Germany.

Beg arrived in Melbourne in 1864 as a ship's surgeon and was ordained by the local Presbyterian congregation at Port Albert. Since Victoria did not offer Semitic scholarships at the time, he accepted a call to Chalmers’ Free Presbyterian Church in Cleveland Paddock, Redfern, and moved to Sydney in 1865.

Arabic was the primary language of the Oriental Languages and Literature readership at the University of Sydney when it was created. Beg was appointed to the post in December 1866.
