= Stanisław Mieroszewski =

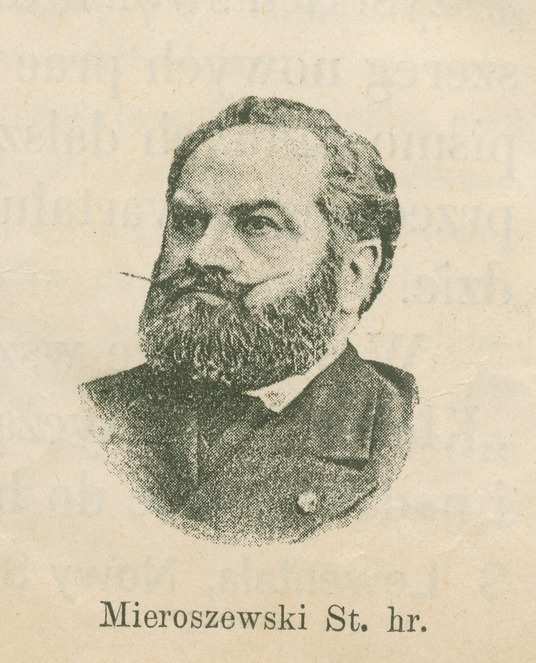
- Born: December 27, 1827; Kraków
- Died: January 4, 1900 (aged 72); Kraków
- Occupations: politician writer historian member of the Imperial Council of Austria

Count Stanisław Mieroszewski (Mieroszowski) (1827–1900) was a Polish-born politician, writer, historian and member of the Imperial Council of Austria.

== Life ==
Mieroszewski was born on December 27, 1827 in Kraków.

He was the son of a landowner. From 1843 to 1844 he studied philosophy at the University of Fribourg in Switzerland and from 1844 to 1847 he studied philosophy and jurisprudence at the University of Freiburg in Germany. From 1847 to 1848 he lived in Paris. From 1849 to 1856, he managed the estates of his mother in Chrzanów. From 1863 he lived with his family in Kraków.

=== Political career ===
From 1866 to 1872 Mieroszewski was a member of the local council in Kraków and the local agricultural society. From 1869 to 1874 he held the post of Chairman of the Kraków County Council. From 1879 to 1882 he served as a government councilor in Bosnia. From 1883 to 1885 he was a member of the Diet of Galicia and Lodomeria in Lviv.

In 1879 he was mentioned as Count Stanislaus Mieroszowski von Mieroszowice, a landowner, resident of Kraków.

=== Retirement and death ===
In 1885 Mieroszewski retired from public life and after a brief stay in Bratislava in 1887 returned to Kraków. There he gathered important works of art and a rich library. He also published numerous feuilletons and articles (mainly letters and travelogues) in newspapers and journals.

Mieroszewski died January 4, 1900 in Kraków.
