= Patagones Partido =

Patagones Partido de Patagones
- Department
- Coat of arms

- location of Patagones Partido in Buenos Aires Province
- Coordinates: 40°49′S 63°00′W
- Country: Argentina
- Established: 1779
- Founder: Francisco de Biedma y Narváez
- Seat: Carmen de Patagones

Government
  - Intendant: Ricardo Evaristo Marino (Union for the Homeland)

Area
  - Total: 13,570 km^{2} (5,240 sq mi)

Population (2022 Census)
  - Total: 37,646
  - Density: 2.774/km^{2} (7.185/sq mi)
- Demonym: maragata/o
- Postal Code: B8504
- IFAM: BUE091
- Area Code: 02920
- Patron saint: ?

Patagones Partido is the southernmost partido of Buenos Aires Province in Argentina.

The provincial subdivision has a population of 37,646 inhabitants (at the 2022 Census) in an area of 13,570 km^{2} (5,240 sq mi), making it by far the largest partido in Buenos Aires Province. The capital city of Patagones Partido is Carmen de Patagones, which is around 960 km (600 mi) from Buenos Aires.

It is bordered on the north by Villarino Partido.

== Economy ==
The economy of Patagones Partido is dominated by farming.

== Settlements (population in 2022 Census) ==
- Bahía San Blas (952)
- Cardenal Cagliero (99)
- Carmen de Patagones (25,982)
- José B. Casas (35)
- Juan A. Pradere (1,042)
- Stroeder (2,117)
- Villalonga (5,987)
- rural diaspora (1,432)
