= Luc Villalonga =

French professional footballer (born 1970)

Personal information
- Date of birth: June 9, 1970 (age 56)
- Place of birth: Oyonnax, France
- Height: 1.70 m (5 ft 7 in)
- Position: Midfielder

Team information
- Current team: RCO Agde

Senior career*
Years	Team	Apps	(Gls)
1988–1990	FC Sète		
1990–1995	RCO Agde		
1995–1996	Rodez AF		
1996–	RCO Agde		
- * Club domestic league appearances and goals as of 19:19, 24 November 2009 (UTC)

Luc Villalonga (born June 9, 1970) is a French professional football player. Currently, he plays in the Championnat de France amateur for RCO Agde.

He played on the professional level in Ligue 2 for FC Sète.
