= Rafaela Ybarra de Vilallonga =

Spanish beatified woman (1843–1900)

Blessed Rafaela Ybarra Arambarri de Vilallonga
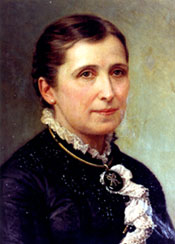

Religious
- Born: 16 January 1843; Bilbao, Vizcaya, Kingdom of Spain
- Died: 23 February 1900 (aged 57); Bilbao, Vizcaya, Kingdom of Spain
- Venerated in: Roman Catholic Church
- Beatified: 30 September 1984, Saint Peter's Square, Vatican City by Pope John Paul II
- Feast: 23 February
- Patronage: Sisters of the Holy Guardian Angels

Rafaela Ybarra Arambarri de Vilallonga (16 January 1843 – 23 February 1900) was a Spanish Roman Catholic widow and the founder of the Sisters of the Holy Guardian Angels. Vilallonga was part of Bilbao's upper-class and she mothered seven children with her husband José Vilallonga.

Her beatification was celebrated on 30 September 1984.

== Life ==
Rafaela Ybarra Arambarri de Vilallonga was born in Bilbao on 16 January 1843 to affluent parents part of the upper-class. Her baptism was celebrated in her local parish church on 17 January and she was baptized in the name of "Rafaela María de la Luz Estefanía de Ybarra i Arambarri. Her parents were Gabriel Ybarra y Gutiérrez de Caviedes and María del Rosario de Arambarri y Mancebo.

Her Confirmation came on 22 May 1844 and she made her First Communion on 21 May 1854. Arambarri married José de Vilallonga y Gipuló (b. 1823) on 14 September 1861. The couple had a total of seven children but two died as infants while another suffered a serious illness in their life.

Ybarra suffered a serious illness while in Paris and she was healed on a trip to Lourdes. But her mother died at that same time - both instances fell on 24 September 1883 - and her father later followed on 10 August 1890. Her husband later died on 7 May 1898. The Jesuit priest Francis de Sales Muruzábel was her spiritual director. In 1890 - with spousal permission - she made private vows to remain chaste and obedient to God.

Bilbao experienced a rapid industrialization process and she set up a series of homes for working-class children and teenage girls as well as workshops for their proper training. Vilallonga promoted a number of institutions for the welfare of women in Bilbao. The premature death of her sister Maria de Rosario prompted her to raise and take care of her half-orphaned nephews which included the Basque linguist Julio Urquijo Ibarra. On 8 December 1894 - alongside three others - made a solemn pledge to become a mother and educator to all poor children in Bilbao. Vilallonga founded a religious order to achieve this on 8 December 1894 and on 2 August 1897 placed the foundation stone for the motherhouse of the order at Zabalbide in Bilbalo which was later opened on 24 March 1899. The order received diocesan approval after her death on 11 March 1901.

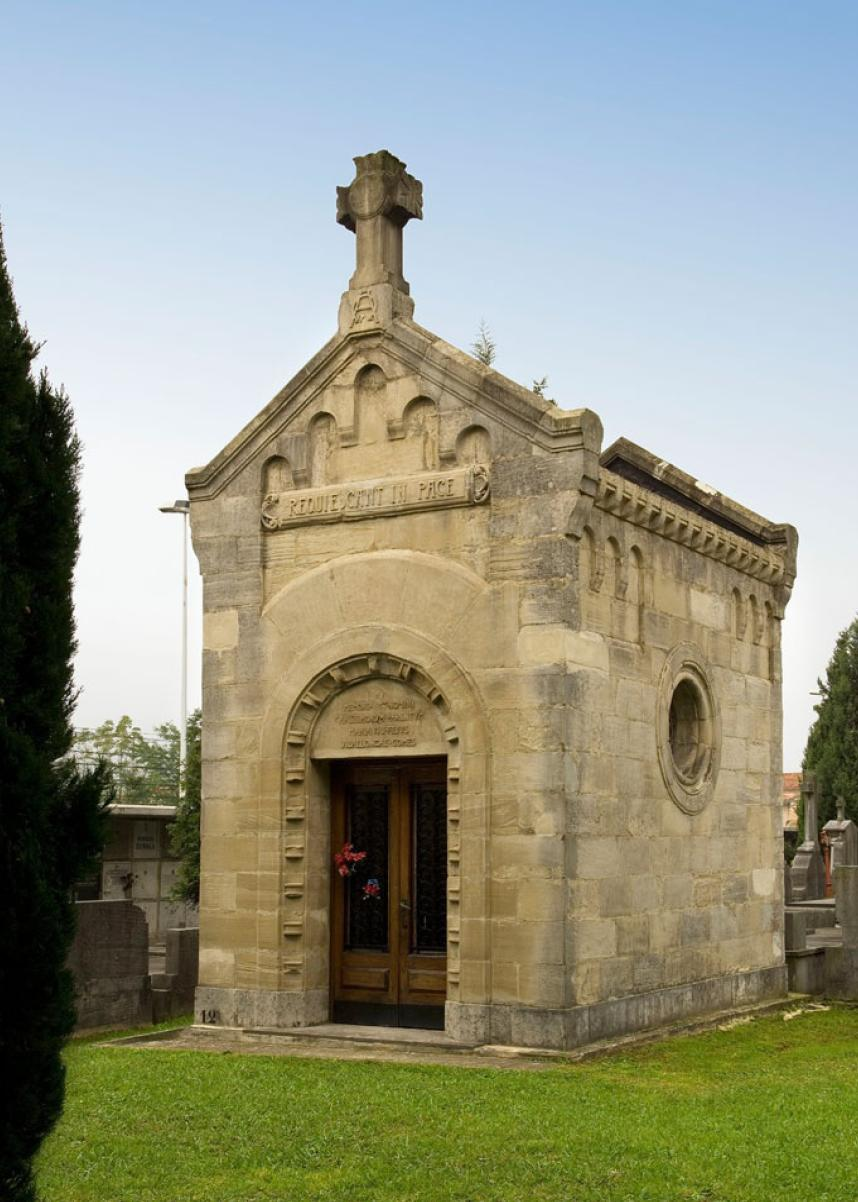
Vilallonga funerary chapel at the Cemetery of Bilbao, where she and her husband were interred.

Ybarra died in 1900 after struggling with a serious illness.

== Beatification ==
The informative process for beatification opened in the Diocese of Vitoria in 1929 and concluded its business in 1931. Theologians approved Ybarra's spiritual writings on 12 May 1937; the formal introduction to the cause came on 11 July 1952 under Pope Pius XII and she became titled as a Servant of God. An apostolic process was then held in the Diocese of Bilbao from 1954 until 1957 while both processes received the validation of the Congregation for Rites in Rome on 16 June 1959.

An antepreparatory committee met to discuss and approve the cause on 19 May 1964 as did a preparatory committee on 15 April 1969 and soon after a general one on 12 June 1969. Pope Paul VI named Vilallonga as Venerable on 16 March 1970 after he confirmed that the late widow had led a model Christian life of heroic virtue. The process for investigating a miracle took place in Buenos Aires in Argentina after Cardinal Santiago Copello inaugurated the process in 1955 and then closed it later in 1957; the Congregation for the Causes of Saints validated the process on 15 March 1974 before a medical board approved it on 16 July 1975. Theologians approved it sometime later on 12 July 1983 as did the C.C.S. on 13 September 1983; Pope John Paul II granted definitive approval that the healing was a miracle and then beatified Vilallonga on 30 September 1984 in Saint Peter's Square.

The process for the miracle needed for sainthood spanned from 26 July 2004 until 7 December 2004 and received C.C.S. validation on 10 June 2005. A medical board approved this miracle on 26 November 2009.

The current postulator for this cause is Dr. Silvia Mónica Correale.

== See also ==
- List of people beatified by Pope John Paul II
- Chronological list of saints and blesseds in the 19th century

== Quotations ==
List of quotations from Blessed Rafela Ybarra Arambarri de Vilallonga:

- « Never tire of doing good ».
- « Be strong in purpose yet gentle in the means ».
