= Villalonga, Buenos Aires =

Villalonga
- Location within Buenos Aires Province Location within Argentina
- Coordinates: 39°54′59″S 62°37′05″W
- Country: Argentina
- Province: Buenos Aires
- Partido: Patagones
- Elevation: 16 m (52 ft)

Population (2022 Census)
  - Total: 5,987
- Time zone: UTC−3 (ART)
- Postal code: B8512
- Climate: BSh

Villalonga is a locality belonging to the Patagones Partido, in the extreme southwest of Buenos Aires Province, Argentina.

== History ==
Before Villalonga was founded, a small settlement had already existed nearby with a set of homes. Upon the construction of a railway station in what would become the town, a man named Francisco Urquijo requested a town to be founded, which the government granted on May 29, 1929.

A social club was established in Villalonga in 1994, which hosts and participates in sporting events in the town.

== Population ==
According to INDEC, which collects population data for the country, the town had a population of 3,705 people as of the 2001 census.
