= Lombe Atthill =

Lombe Athill (3 December 1827 – 14 September 1910) was a Northern Irish obstetrician and gynaecologist. Hailing from Ardess, Magheraculmoney in County Fermanagh, he studied at the Trinity College, Dublin, and obtained his licence to practice from the Royal College of Surgeons in Ireland in 1847. That year, he became the surgeon to a charitable dispensary in Fleet Street, Dublin, and then dispensary doctor of the district of Geashill in King's County from 1848 to 1850. He began working as an assistant physician at the Rotunda Hospital in 1851. In November 1875, he was elected master of the hospital, and was one of the leading experts on gynaecology in the country at the time. He was elected president of the Irish College of Physicians in 1888.
