= Carmen de Patagones =

City in Buenos Aires Province, Argentina

- City
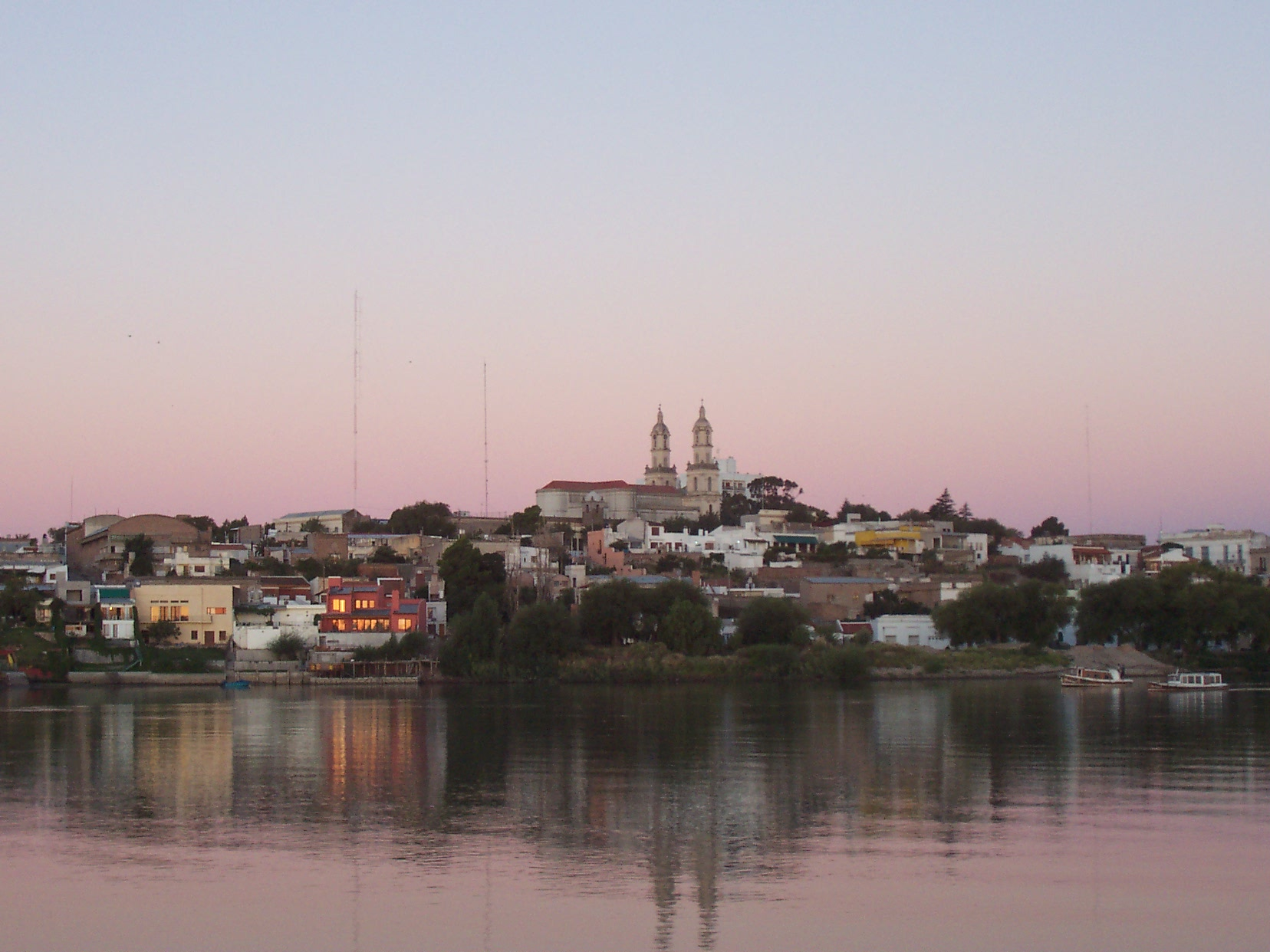
- Carmen de Patagones from Viedma

- Coat of arms

- Location within Buenos Aires Province Location within Argentina
- Coordinates: 40°47′S 62°58′W
- Country: Argentina
- Province: Buenos Aires
- Partido: Patagones
- Founded: 1779
- Elevation: 15 m (49 ft)

Population (2022 census [INDEC])
  - Total: 25,982
- CPA Base: B 8504
- Area code: +54 2920

Carmen de Patagones is the southernmost city in the province of Buenos Aires, Argentina.

== Geography ==
It is located 937 km southwest from the city of Buenos Aires, on the north bank of the Río Negro ("Black River"), near the Atlantic Ocean, and opposite Viedma, capital of the province of Río Negro. The city is the capital of the Patagones Partido, the only administrative division of Buenos Aires Province that lies within Patagonia.

== History ==
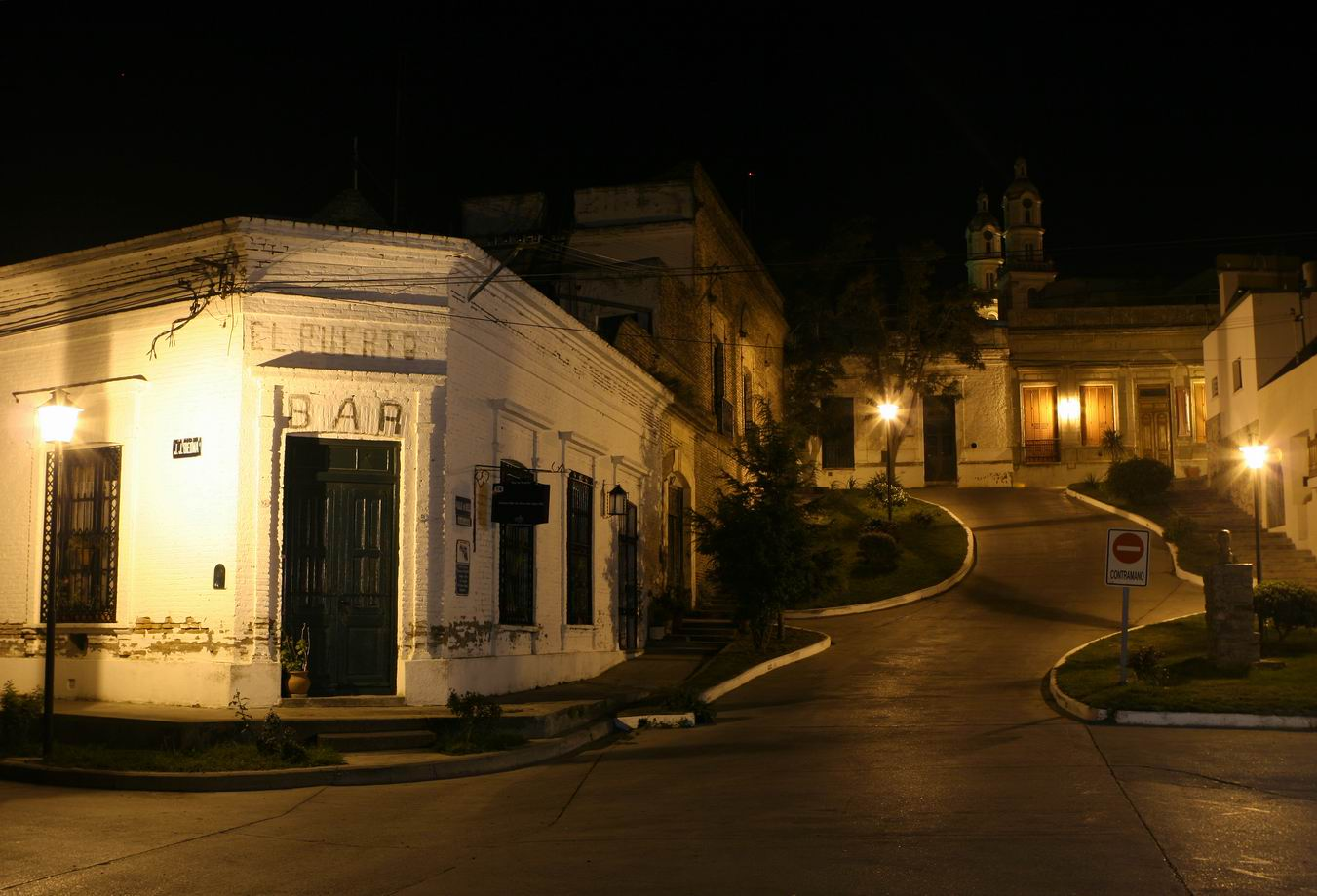
A streetscape in the old town

The town was founded in 1779 by Francisco de Viedma, an explorer leading a Spanish expedition commissioned with colonizing Patagonia's shores.

In the 19th century, Carmen de Patagones had a fort, and after the May Revolution of 1810, it became a prison for royalists (Spaniards and pro-Spanish locals against the independence movement).

Later, during the Cisplatine War (1825–1828), the town became a naval base, since the main Argentine safe harbour, the estuary of the Río de la Plata, had been blocked by Brazilian ships. The Brazilian troops attempted to take Carmen de Patagones, but they were repelled by armed residents on 7 March 1827; this date is still commemorated with a festival in the city. The city maintains two imperial Brazilian flags captured during the battle in the central cathedral on the site of the original fort where the battle took place.

The town and its twin city, Viedma, became the focus of attention in 1986, when President Raúl Alfonsín announced the Patagonia Project, which envisaged the transfer of the nation's capital to a new federal district encompassing both Carmen de Patagones and Viedma, the two towns at the mouth of the Río Negro. Approved by the Congress in 1987, the plan was rescinded when Alfonsín's successor, President Carlos Menem, disbanded Entecap, the commission overseeing the project, in 1989.

== Notable people ==
- Luis Piedra Buena, sailor
- Emilio Mitre, military officer
- Javier van de Couter, actor, producer, film and television director and screenwriter

== See also ==
- Carmen de Patagones school shooting
- Battle of Carmen de Patagones
