= Rodrigo Pinto Guedes, Baron of Rio da Prata =

Brazilian naval admiral (1762–1845)

Rodrigo Pinto Guedes Baron of Rio da Prata
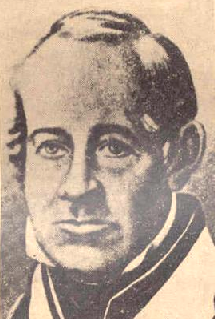
- Born: Rodrigo Pinto Guedes; 27 July 1762; Aguiar da Beira, Portugal
- Died: 13 June 1845 (aged 82); Paris, France
- Burial place: Montmartre Cemetery
- Military career
- Allegiance: Kingdom of Portugal; United Kingdom of Portugal, Brazil and the Algarves; Empire of Brazil
- Branch: Imperial Brazilian Navy
- Rank: Commander
- Known for: Commander of all naval operations during the Cisplatine War

Rodrigo Pinto Guedes, Baron of Rio da Prata (27 July 1762 – 13 June 1845) was a Portuguese-born Brazilian naval officer who served in the admiralties of the Kingdom of Portugal, its successor the United Kingdom of Portugal, Brazil and the Algarves, and finally the Empire of Brazil, for which he acted as commander of all naval operations during the Cisplatine War.

== Biography ==
Guedes was born in the freguesia of Gradiz, Aguiar da Beira, on 27 July 1762 to Rodrigo Pinto Guedes and Maria da Silveira Pereira. His parents intended him to take on a religious life, and sent him to a monastery; however, he ran away and decided to embark on a maritime career. In September 1781, he was named a cadete (cadet) of the Portuguese Navy, and thus began what would prove to be a successful career.

He married Constanza Smissaert Pinto Caldas, daughter of José Pereira Caldas and Constanza Smissaert.

Guedes retired from the Navy on 11 May 1832. He moved to Paris, where he died on 13 June 1845, and was buried in the Montmartre Cemetery.
