= Joaquim Marques Lisboa, Marquis of Tamandaré =

Brazilian admiral and noble (1807–1897)

Marquis of Tamandaré
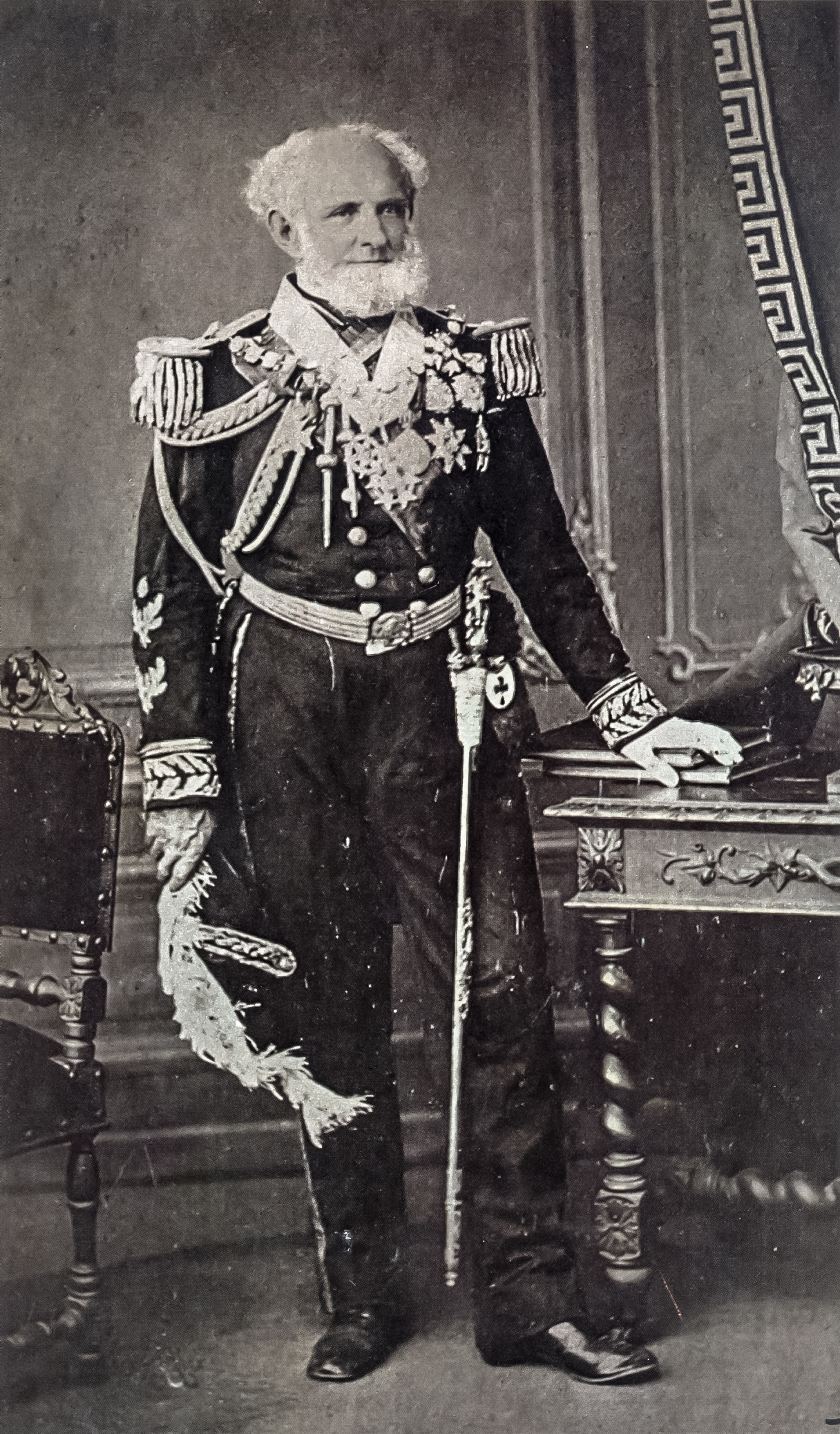
- The Marquis of Tamandaré, 1873
- Born: 13 December 1807; Rio Grande, Rio Grande do Sul, State of Brazil, Portuguese America
- Died: 20 March 1897 (aged 89); Rio de Janeiro, Federal District, Brazil
- Military career
- Allegiance: Empire of Brazil
- Branch: Imperial Brazilian Navy
- Rank: Admiral
- Conflicts: Brazilian War of Independence; Cisplatine War; Ragamuffin War; Uruguayan War; Paraguayan War
- Other work: Minister of War
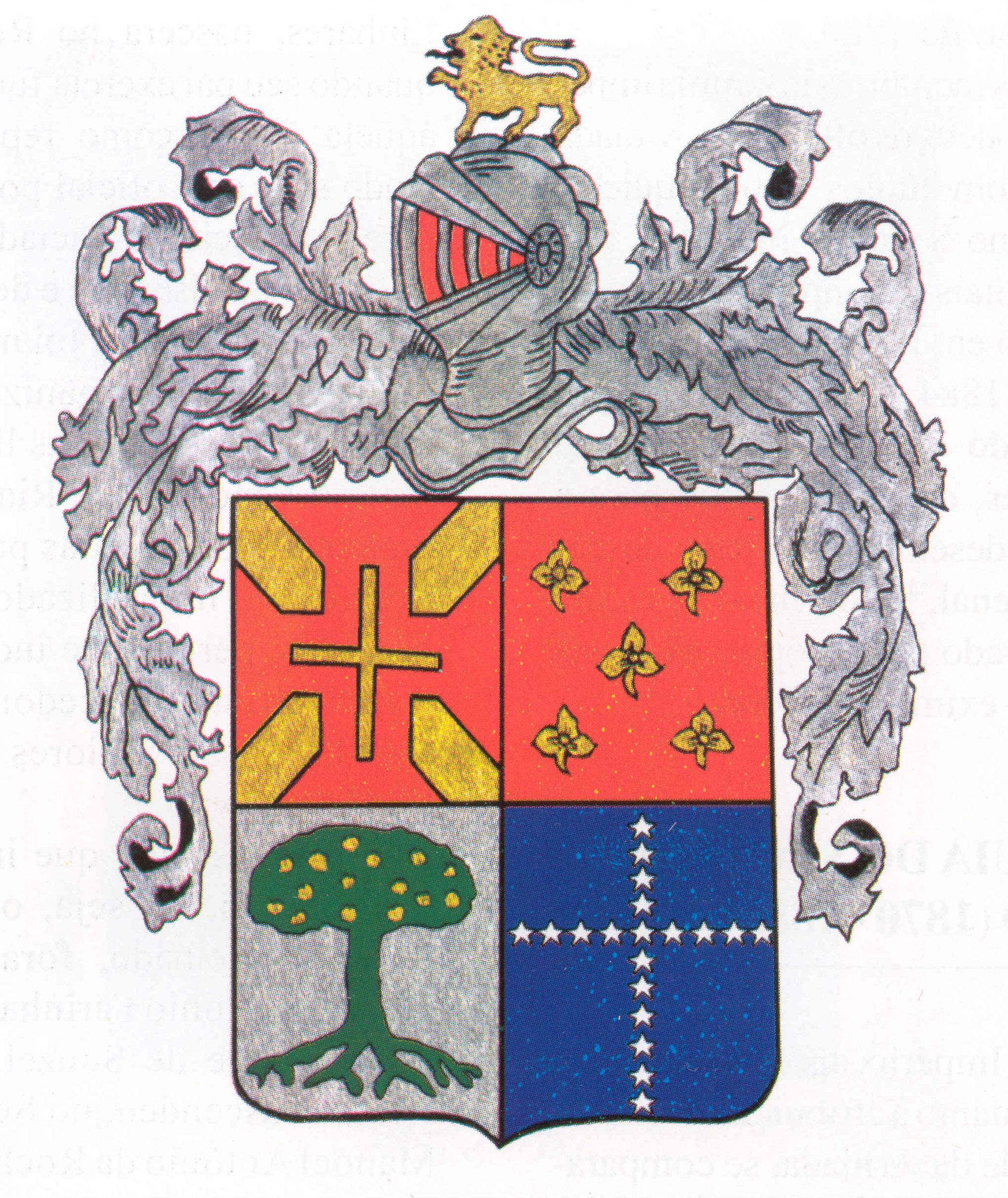
- Coat of Arms of the Marquis of Tamandaré

Admiral Joaquim Marques Lisboa, Marquis of Tamandaré (13 December 1807 – 20 March 1897) was a Brazilian admiral of the Imperial Brazilian Navy. He served in the Brazilian Navy for much of his life and was a member of Brazil's Military and Justice Council, later the Supreme Military Court, from its inception until 1891, when the Republican government granted him leave.

Tamandaré is regarded as a national military figure and patron of the Brazilian Navy. His birthday, 13 December, was chosen as Brazil's national Sailor's Day by Admiral Alexandrino de Alencar, a naval minister in the early 20th century, on 4 September 1925.

As a young lieutenant, Tamandaré took part in the Brazilian War of Independence, the repression of the Confederation of the Equator, and the Cisplatine War, also known as the "Argentine-Brazilian War" of 1825–1828, or, in Argentine and Uruguayan historiography, the Brazil War. He saw action during the Regency period, when the Empire faced widespread instability and regional uprisings, including the Cabanagem in Pará (1835–1838), the Sabinada in Bahia (1837–1839), the Ragamuffin War in Rio Grande do Sul (1835–1845), the Balaiada in Maranhão (1838–1839), and the Praieira in Pernambuco (1848–1849).

In regional conflicts, he participated in the Platine War (1851–1852) against Argentina's Juan Manuel de Rosas and later in the Paraguayan War as commander of Brazilian naval operations under the Treaty of the Triple Alliance, signed by Brazil, Uruguay, and Argentina on 1 May 1865.

In the Río de la Plata Basin, Tamandaré led naval operations in the battles of Passo da Pátria, Curuzú, and Curupayty. After the Allied defeat at Curupayty, he blamed Argentina's Bartolomé Mitre, who commanded the Allied land forces at the battle. Tamandaré and his chief of staff, Francisco Barroso, later left the conflict and did not return to Paraguay. The war continued until Solano López was killed at the Battle of Cerro Corá and Paraguay surrendered.

Tamandaré remains a subject of study among military and civilian historians.

== Biography ==
Joaquim Marques Lisboa was the son of Francisco Marques Lisboa, a Portuguese man born in Vila de Famalicão, in the province of Minho, in 1767, and Eufrásia Joaquina de Azevedo Lima, who was born in Viamão, Rio Grande do Sul. He was the tenth child of the couple. Among his siblings was Henrique Marques de Oliveira Lisboa, a lieutenant colonel who fought in the Ragamuffin War in Laguna, Rio Grande do Sul.

Francisco Marques Lisboa owned properties in Rio Grande and in the present-day municipality of São José do Norte, which is separated from Rio Grande by a canal connecting Lagoa dos Patos to the Atlantic Ocean. There has been debate over whether the future Admiral was born in Rio Grande or São José do Norte, with both places claiming to be his birthplace. No complete birth certificate is known, which has contributed to the dispute. In December 1883, Tamandaré addressed the Rio Grande city council and identified the city as his birthplace.

When he was five years old, he traveled to Rio de Janeiro, where he was cared for by his sister, Maria Eufrásia, and her husband, José Antônio Lisboa, until he completed his primary education at the school of Professor Carvalho. At the age of 13, accompanied by his parents, Joaquim returned to his native province on the same vessel that had taken him to Rio de Janeiro. In 1821, travelling alone on one of his father's sailing vessels, he returned to Rio de Janeiro to continue his education.

On 22 November 1822, at his father's insistence, Joaquim Lisboa agreed to serve as a volunteer in the squadron sent to fight Portuguese forces stationed in Bahia. On 4 March 1823, he began his career in the Imperial Navy as a volunteer aboard the frigate Niterói, under the command of John Taylor, The vessel flew Admiral Cochrane's flag.

José Marques Lisboa, his brother and a member of the Ministry of Foreign Affairs, also acted on his behalf. He sent Cochrane a petition requesting attestation that Joaquim served voluntarily under his command. In the same year, he submitted a request to the director of the Imperial Navy Academy certifying the period during which Joaquim had attended studies in Rio de Janeiro, as well as his conduct and service. With these certificates, José Marques Lisboa sent an application to the emperor and Commander Taylor requesting Joaquim's formal promotion. On 2 December 1825, Joaquim Marques Lisboa was promoted. The need for qualified Brazilian officers to serve in the fleet in Montevideo gave him another opportunity, and on 26 January 1826 he was made a second lieutenant in the navy.

During that conflict, he took part in the escape of 95 Brazilians who had been captured after the battle of Carmen de Patagones. Marques Lisboa and Eyre managed to seize control of the Republic brig Ana, which was carrying them to Salado, and returned to Montevideo.

He married Maria Eufrásia, his niece and childhood friend, who was close to him in age. The marriage took place on 19 February 1839, at Our Lady of Glory Church (Igreja de Nossa Senhora da Glória) in Rio de Janeiro.

After the Battle of Riachuelo, the number of wounded and disabled combatants arriving in the capital increased, creating the need for an asylum where they could receive treatment. Tamandaré's wife, the Viscountess of Tamandaré, helped organise fundraising activities, including auctions and other social events, to support this effort.

The title "Tamandaré" was derived from a village and harbour on the Pernambuco coast. In 1824, his older brother Manoel Marques Lisboa had taken up arms there for the Confederation of the Equator against the newly established Empire. Manoel died during the second imperial attempt to take control of the area. Decades later, during a visit by Emperor Dom Pedro II to the Pernambuco coast, Joaquim Lisboa asked to stop there and transfer his brother's remains to the family estate in Rio de Janeiro. Dom Pedro agreed and, reportedly moved by the gesture, later granted him the honorary title of Baron of Tamandaré.

During Tamandaré's lifetime, Brazil passed from Portuguese colonial rule to the United Kingdom of Portugal, Brazil and Algarves, then to the Empire of Brazil in 1822, and finally to the republican period after 1889. Tamandaré played a role in several conflicts connected with the formation and consolidation of the Brazilian state.

=== Career ===
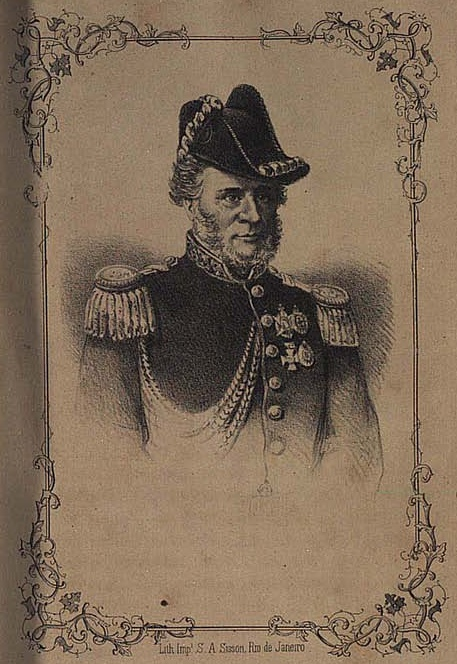
The then-Viscount of Tamandaré in 1866

==== Early naval service and the War of Independence ====
Tamandaré's career is often used as a way to understand the military and political history of 19th-century Brazil.

Throughout his military life, many episodes from his career acquired a legendary character. Several authors note that, despite his proximity to Emperor Dom Pedro II, Tamandaré did not hold political office, which was common among prominent military figures of the period. Instead, he acted primarily in the military sphere, serving the Empire in internal and external conflicts.

His introduction to naval life came during a solo journey to Rio de Janeiro aboard a vessel owned by his father's company, when he assisted the captain as a pilot. Political tensions at the time gave him the opportunity to enlist as a volunteer and begin his career in the National Navy, eventually rising to the highest rank in the naval hierarchy.

Political change accelerated in the Kingdom of Brazil after King João VI returned to Portugal, leaving his son, Regent Prince Dom Pedro, in Brazil to govern on behalf of the Portuguese crown. Dissatisfied with decisions made by the Lisbon Cortes, Pedro refused to obey them, contributing to the political separation that culminated in the proclamation of Brazilian independence. He was later crowned constitutional emperor and perpetual defender of Brazil as Dom Pedro I.

As a volunteer aboard the Niterói, Tamandaré took part in several naval engagements along the coast of Bahia. He had his baptism of fire on 4 May 1823, when the Brazilian fleet engaged enemy gunboats. Days later, he helped pursue fleeing Portuguese forces. The Niterói captured or disabled enemy ships and carried the imperial flag almost to the entrance of the Tagus River.

==== Confederation of the Equator and the Cisplatine War ====
After returning from an important mission entrusted to the Niterói, Marques Lisboa enrolled at the Imperial Navy Academy in March 1824. Meanwhile, domestic events required the squadron's presence in different parts of the country to assert the authority of the central government. Still recovering from the War of Independence, some ships were sent to Pernambuco to suppress the revolution led by Manoel de Carvalho Pais de Andrade, whose objective was to unite several northeastern provinces, proclaim a republic, and establish the Confederation of the Equator. When Marques Lisboa learned that a naval division was heading north to suppress the revolutionary movement, he asked Admiral Cochrane for permission to board one of the ships in the division.

Francisco Vilela Barbosa, then Minister of the Navy, refused the request. Cochrane then appealed directly to the emperor, presenting the case for the young Joaquim. Convinced by Cochrane's arguments, the emperor issued an imperial resolution on 30 July 1824, naming the volunteer Joaquim Marques Lisboa to serve aboard the fleet's flagship, Pedro I. After the rebels were suppressed, the fleet remained in the region to prevent further revolutionary outbreaks. Marques Lisboa carefully carried out all the missions assigned to him.

Beginning in 1825, during the Cisplatine Campaign, the young Marques Lisboa served aboard the gunboat Leal Paulistana, under the command of First Lieutenant Antonio Carlos Ferreira. His service in the war began on 8 February 1826, in what became known as the Combat of Corals. Later that year, he returned to the Niterói under the command of James Norton. He distinguished himself in the subsequent fighting and, on 31 July 1826, was assigned command of the schooner Conga, his first naval command. He was only 18 years old at the time of his appointment.

After an unsuccessful land invasion of the village of Carmen de Pantagones, intended to control the entrance to the Río Negro, he returned to combat in the Río de la Plata estuary aboard the frigate Príncipe Imperial, the flagship of the naval division responsible for escorting a convoy of 18 merchant ships.

He was taken prisoner with 93 men. However, the Argentine captors did not anticipate the initiative of the young officer, who, together with his consort Constance, planned and carried out the seizure of the prison ship, the brig Anna. The escort accompanying them did not realise that the vessel had fallen into Brazilian hands until, in a daring manoeuvre, they set sail and fled to Montevideo.

He was promoted to first lieutenant on 12 October 1827. At the age of 20, he took command of the schooner Bela Maria. After engaging in an intense artillery battle with an Argentine ship and winning, he showed a humanitarian attitude toward the defeated enemy, earning him the recognition of the vanquished in 1828. After the end of the war, he spent another two years in the waters of the River Plate, and in 1831 he was sent back to Rio de Janeiro.

==== Regency period and rise through the ranks ====
After the abdication of Emperor Dom Pedro I in 1831, Marques Lisboa was involved in suppressing rebellions throughout the country, from north to south. In 1831, he saw action in the northeast, including in Pernambuco, Pará, Recife, and Ceará. In 1834, he was appointed to command the brig Cacique, which he commanded during the Ragamuffin War. In 1840, he had reached the rank of captain of frigate and, in 1847, captain of sea and war.

In 1848, he received the frigate Dom Afonso in Great Britain. It was the Brazilian Navy's first large steam-and-sail warship. Along with the Prince of Joinville, the Duke of Aumale, and Fleet Admiral John Pascoe Grenfell, he took part in the rescue of the English ship Ocean Monarch, which was carrying immigrants from Liverpool to Boston and caught fire near the port. The rescue saved 156 people.

On 6 March 1850, while returning from Pernambuco, where he had fought in the Praieira Revolt, Marques Lisboa encountered the ship Vasco da Gama in distress off Rio de Janeiro. The vessel had lost its mast in a heavy storm and was exposed to the storm. Because of the difficult conditions, Marques Lisboa could not approach the vessel immediately, but remained nearby through the night and succeeded in rescuing it at dawn the following day.

In 1852, he was promoted to the rank of head of division, equivalent to commodore in several other navies. In 1854, he was promoted to chief of squadron, a rank roughly equivalent to rear admiral.

In 1857, while in Europe accompanying his wife during medical treatment, he was commissioned by the Imperial Government to supervise the construction of two gunboats in France and eight in Great Britain. These steam-powered vessels represented an important modernisation of the Brazilian Navy and later served in the Uruguayan War and the Paraguayan War.

==== Uruguayan War ====
Before the surrender of Montevideo, Tamandaré led operations at Salto and Paysandú, which were occupied by Brazilian forces. He commanded Brazilian intervention in the Eastern Republic of Uruguay in 1864 and 1865. The rivalry between the Blanco and Colorado parties had destabilised the country and led to civil war. Because approximately 40,000 Brazilians lived in Uruguay, the conflict became a matter of concern for the Brazilian Empire.

The conflict was further complicated by the involvement of Paraguay and Argentina, which supported opposing sides in pursuit of their own interests. On 10 August 1864, Baron of Tamandaré was appointed to support the diplomatic mission of Councillor Jose Antonio Saraiva and to protect the interests of the Empire and its citizens in Uruguay.

On 11 August 1864, Saraiva left Montevideo after negotiations failed, while Tamandaré and the Brazilian naval forces in the Río de la Plata remained to enforce the demands of the Imperial Government. According to a letter sent by Tamandaré to the Brazilian Minister of Foreign Affairs, his objective was to obtain satisfaction from the Uruguayan government for injuries suffered by Brazilian citizens and guarantees for their persons and property, without humiliating Uruguay or harming its citizens.

On 30 August, diplomatic relations between Brazil and Uruguay were formally broken. On 7 September, the Imperial Government ordered the occupation of the Uruguayan towns of Paysandú, Salto, and Cerro Largo, and recognised General Venancio Flores as one of the belligerents. By October, the Brazilian Government had also authorised the occupation of territory north of the Río Negro until guarantees and reparations were obtained from Uruguay.

The deterioration of relations between Brazil and Uruguay contributed to the broader regional tensions that culminated in the Paraguayan War. Tamandaré commanded the Brazilian intervention and carried out the policies established by the Imperial Government using the military forces at his disposal.

==== Paraguayan War ====
His initial participation in the conflict was important for the provision of Brazilian forces, especially in a situation in which Brazil and Paraguay had limited knowledge of each other's political intentions and military capabilities. He sought to improve that situation through the Imperial Legation at Asunción. However, the response of the minister stationed there contributed to an inaccurate assessment of the enemy's forces and reserves and, consequently, to the formulation of an overly optimistic plan. Paraguay had recently modernised its fortifications under the supervision of foreign officers of the highest calibre, reforms that led contemporaries to compare them with some of the world's most notable fortifications, including Sevastopol, Gibraltar, and Richmond.

Admiral Tamandaré took steps to protect the regions likely to be affected first. He sent letters to the president of the province of Mato Grosso warning of Paraguayan intentions to initiate hostilities and did the same with the commander of the flotilla stationed in the region in an effort to minimise potential damage. The responses he received, however, were discouraging. The commander of the flotilla stated that his force was small and possessed insufficient firepower to resist an invasion.

Responsible for Brazilian forces in the Río de la Plata, Tamandaré considered it essential to inform the Minister of the Navy of the need to create a transport fleet capable of ensuring the mobility of the Imperial Army throughout the region. For Tamandaré, war was already a reality, and he believed that the period before the first shot was fired, the first cavalry charge was launched, and the first cannon was fired should be dedicated to preparation. Despite the admiral's requests and warnings, the Imperial Government took no immediate action, probably because of its limited knowledge of enemy territory and the true extent of Paraguayan mobilisation.

After Solano López's invasion of the province of Corrientes, Tamandaré asked the Minister of the Navy how he should proceed in the broader campaign plan. In response, he was authorised to put into practice proposals he had previously presented to the Court. He ordered the blockade of Paraguayan ports on the Paraná River in order to isolate Paraguay and support army operations.

Concerned with mobility and supply, he also purchased large quantities of coal in the province of Corrientes and at other locations along the Paraná River. Anticipating an escalation of the conflict, he repeatedly requested reinforcements in his communications, warning, "Every lost day will matter to us in increasing expenses and sacrifices, to achieve the same result that could be obtained with energy and decision."

The complex political and military problems that hampered the Empire's naval action in the Río de la Plata required Tamandaré to divide his attention between Montevideo and Buenos Aires. Brazil's neighbours, despite their dislike of Solano López's government, were reluctant to become involved in a war in the region because of their own internal disputes. Furthermore, a regional war would have had a serious impact on the economies of these closely connected and interdependent nations.

Tamandaré therefore sought to secure as much support as possible for the Brazilian Empire without placing excessive pressure on neighbouring countries, which might have turned them against Brazil. However, López's invasion of the Argentine province of Corrientes strengthened the conviction among Tamandaré and the leaders of those republics that Paraguay had to be opposed. Even so, this violation of Argentine territory did not immediately lead Argentina to align itself directly with Brazil.

Despite the political difficulties, the Treaty of the Triple Alliance was signed on 1 May 1865, establishing cooperation between Uruguay, Argentina, and Brazil for the duration of the conflict against Paraguay.

Admiral Joaquim Marques Lisboa, then the Marquis of Tamandaré, was placed in command of the Brazilian naval forces operating against Paraguay. The Brazilian Navy represented most of the naval power present in the theatre of operations.

Overall command of the Allied armies was exercised by the President of Argentina, General Bartolomé Mitre. In accordance with the Treaty of the Triple Alliance, however, the Brazilian naval forces were not subordinate to him.

The allied naval strategy centred on a blockade. The Paraná and Paraguay rivers were Paraguay's principal lines of communication. The Brazilian naval forces were organised into three divisions: one remained in the Río de la Plata, while the other two advanced up the Paraná River to enforce the blockade.

On 11 June 1865, the Battle of Riachuelo was fought on the Paraná River, near the mouth of the Riachuelo stream. The Brazilian fleet, commanded by Chief of Staff Francisco Manuel Barroso da Silva, later Baron of Amazonas, fought throughout the day against the Paraguayan fleet under Commander Meza. Several Paraguayan vessels were sunk, while a few heavily damaged ships managed to escape.

During the battle, Barroso issued a number of signal flags from his flagship, the frigate Amazonas, transmitting orders to the other Brazilian commanders. Two of the most famous signals were:

- 779 – "Brazil expects each one to fulfil his duty."
- 10 – "Hold up the fire that victory is ours."

In 1866, for health and political reasons, Tamandaré requested to be relieved of his command and was replaced by Admiral Joaquim José Inácio, later Viscount of Inhaúma.

==== Later years and the Proclamation of the Republic ====
At the time of the Proclamation of the Republic of Brazil, on 15 November 1889, the Marquis of Tamandaré remained loyal to Pedro II of Brazil. He spent an hour alone with the emperor and asked for permission to have the Imperial Navy launch a coup d'état, but the request was denied.

At the age of 82, and as one of the last prominent monarchist military leaders still alive, he refused to accept the end of the monarchy and remained hopeful that it would be restored. He stayed with the imperial family until they boarded the ship Alagoas for exile.

He was retired in 1890 under a decree of 30 December 1889, having reached the mandatory retirement age. In 1893, he was appointed a minister of the Supreme Military Court.

== Honours and awards ==
Ribbon bar of the Medalha Mérito Tamandaré

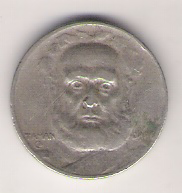
Lisboa's portrait on the 100 Reis coin, 1936

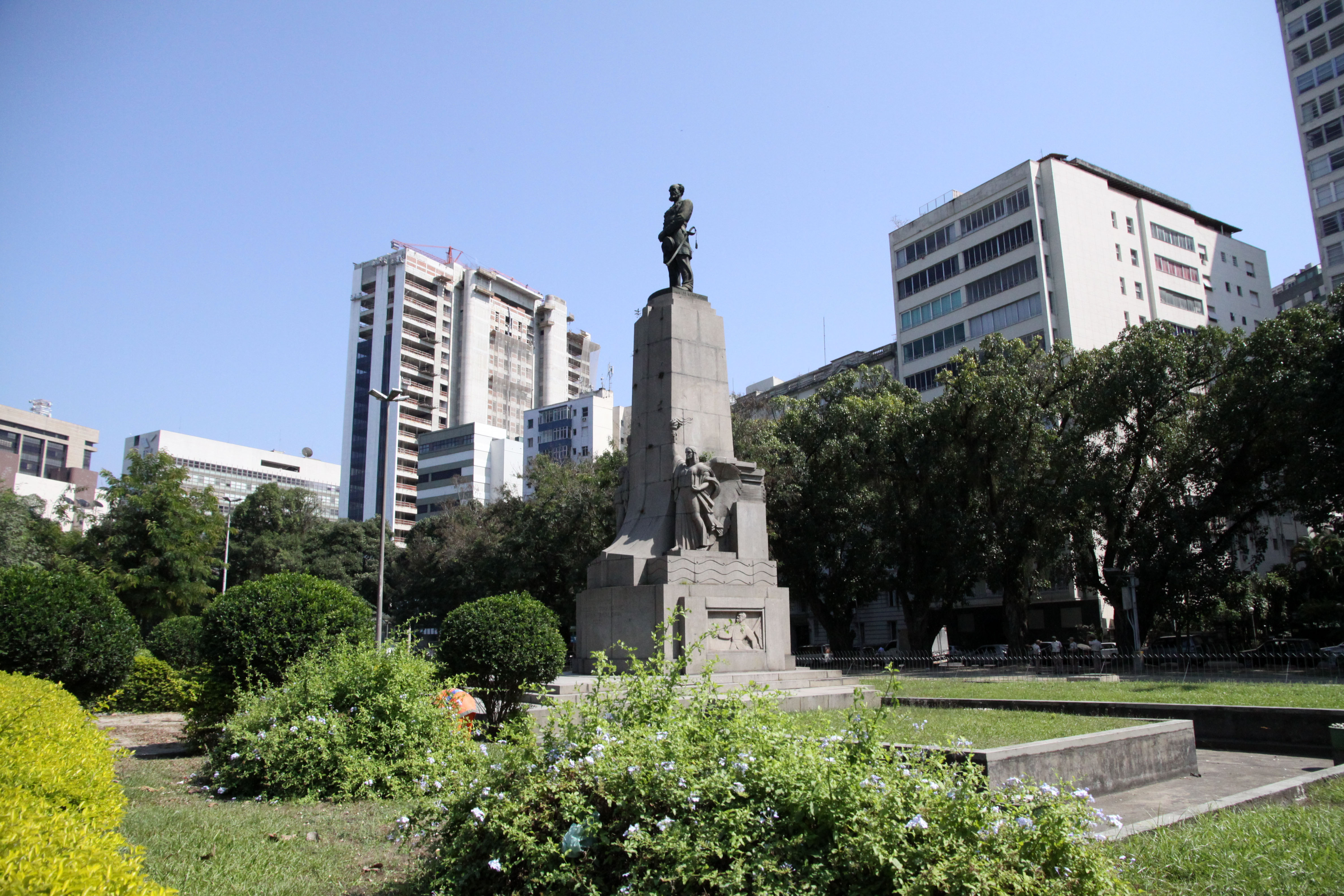
Monument to Lisboa in Rio de Janeiro

- For his services to the Empire, he was awarded the titles of Baron with Grandeur (14 March 1860), Viscount with Grandeur (18 February 1865), Count (13 December 1887) and Marquês de Tamandaré (16 May 1888), being the first officer of the Brazilian Navy to gain a title of nobility. D. Pedro II chose the name Tamandaré in honor of a beach in Pernambuco where he was in transit with the future Admiral, who asked the Emperor for the favor of collecting the remains of his brother Manoel Marques Lisboa, buried in the cemetery of that locality.
- By ministerial notice of 1957, the coat of arms of the Marquês de Tamandaré was approved.
- 1841 - Officer of the Imperial Order of the Cross; for services rendered in Maranhão, during the Cabanas revolution.
- 1846 - Officer of the Imperial Order of the Rose; in his Decree dated November 14, 1846, the Emperor does not explain the reason for this concession, but says that "wishing to decorate and honor the Captain of the Fragata Joaquim Marques Lisboa, I should like to name him Officer of the said Order."
- 1849 - Dignitary of the Imperial Order of the Cruise; for services rendered in defense of public order in Pernambuco, during the Praieira Revolution.
- 1849 - Commander of the Military Order of the Tower and Sword; conferred by D. Maria II, as a testimony of the appreciation for his services on the occasion of the rescue of the Portuguese vessel Vasco da Gama, off the coast of Rio de Janeiro.
- Commander of the Imperial Order of the Cross; Tamandaré held this commendation in particularly high regard, because he belonged to D. Pedro II. During a reception in Uruguaiana, Dom Pedro II received in a special audience the English Ambassador Thornton, to try to reestablish relations between Brazil and England, interrupted since the Christie Question. Realizing Tamandaré that the Commendation of the Emperor presented a small defect, he exchanged his decoration with that of Pedro II, who ended up permanently staying with her.
- 1859 - Commander of the Imperial Order of the Rose; for services rendered during the epidemic of cholera morbus that affected different provinces of the Empire in the years 1855 and 1856.
- Great Cross of the Order of Francis Joseph of Austria; awarded by Emperor Franz Joseph, was authorized to use it on 26 November 1860.
- 1861 - Commander of the Order of St. Benedict of Aviz; in reward for its 35 years of good services rendered to the country.
- 1865 - Gentleman of the Imperial Order of the Rose; for the relevant services rendered to the country, during the Uruguayan State Campaign.
- 1867 - Grand Cross effective of the Imperial Order of the Rose; in attention to the good services rendered in the Naval Force in Operations of War against the Government of Paraguay.
- 1868 - Grand Cross of the Order of Saint Benedict of Aviz, in reward for his 45 years of good service to the country.
- Necklace of the Imperial Order of the Rose; in view of the relevant services rendered to the country in the wars against Uruguay and the Government of Paraguay.
- Gold medal commemorating the taking of the city of Paissandu, with the help of naval forces under his command.
- Gold medal in commemoration of the surrender of Uruguaiana, to which it contributed effectively with its River Flotilla.
- Medal of Military Merit, of bronze with silver passer, bearing the number 3, granted to all the officers who obtained prizes by acts of bravery in the Campaign of Paraguay.
- General Medal of the Paraguayan Campaign, in gold, with the character of the Cross of Malta, in recognition of the services rendered to the Homeland in the Campaign of Paraguay, bringing in the passer the number of years spent in the campaign, counting nine months for a year.
- Commemorative Medal of War against the Government of Paraguay, granted by the Argentine Republic to all members of the Armada and Allied Armies.
- Medal Commemorative of the War against the Government of Paraguay, conferred by the Eastern Republic of Uruguay to all members of the Armada and Allied Armies, who took an effective part in said Campaign. (Medal awarded post-mortem)
- Oval Medal of the War of Independence; at the gala ceremonies, gave her special importance, always putting her in more evidence, hanging from her neck, displaying her pride of having contributed, on board the Niterói, to Brazil's freedom.
- Gold medal with lace of brilliant; offered by the Montevidean ladies.
- Gold medal; offered by the Liverpool Shipwreck Human Society, with dedication, in honor of the rescue of the passengers and crew of the Steam Ocean Monarch.
- Gold medal; offered by the Lord Mayor of Liverpool, with dedication, in honor of the rescue of the passengers and crew of the Steam Ocean Monarch.
- Gold chronometer; offered by the British Government, containing the following dedication: "Present of the British Government to Commander Joaquim Marques Lisboa, of the Fragata Afonso da Marinha Imperial Brasileira, in testimony of his admiration for the bravery and humanitarian manifestation to the rescue to many subjects of the fire of the ship Ocean Monarch, August 1848."
- Sword of gold, carved with dedication; offered by the Portuguese Colony of Rio de Janeiro, in honor of the rescue of Nau Vasco da Gama.

== Legacy ==
=== Ships ===
Over time the Brazilian Navy has named several ships in honour of its patron.

- Ironclad Tamandaré: Built at the Navy Arsenal in Rio de Janeiro and incorporated into the Imperial Navy in 1865. It was one of the first ironclads built in Brazil and played an important role in operations on the Paraguay River during the War of the Triple Alliance.
- Protected Cruiser Almirante Tamandaré: A mixed-propulsion vessel built at the Navy Arsenal in Rio de Janeiro to a design by the Naval Engineer João Cândido Brasil. It was incorporated into the navy in 1891 and decommissioned in 1915. With a displacement of 4,500 tons, it was the largest warship built in Brazil up to that time.
- Light Cruiser Tamandaré: Built in the United States in 1938, it served in World War II with the United States Navy under the name Saint Louis. It was transferred to the Brazilian Navy under the Mutual Defense Assistance Act, entered service in 1951, and was retired in 1976.

=== UNESCO Memory of the World ===
The Brazilian Navy Archive holds a collection known as the Tamandaré Archive, consisting of approximately 1,500 catalogued documents of correspondence. The collection comprises 1,492 documents divided among 17 books and is an important source of historical material relating to the patron of the Brazilian Navy.

The collection was established in 1949, when the Ministry of the Navy purchased documents and objects from Leon Victor Louis Robichez and Luiza Marques Lisboa Robichez, a granddaughter of the Marquis of Tamandaré. Among the materials acquired were 153 official communications from the Ministry of the Navy during the Paraguayan War, records relating to the stranding of the Jequitinhonha, and documents concerning Joaquim Marques Lisboa's promotions and appointments, as well as numerous other historical records.

In 2010, the collection was presented to the Brazilian Committee of UNESCO's Memory of the World Programme and was nominated to the Memory of the World Brazil register. It was subsequently included in the register of documentary heritage maintained under UNESCO's Memory of the World Programme.

=== In popular culture ===
In Sid Meier's Civilization VI, players can recruit Tamandaré as a Great Admiral.

== See also ==
- Tamandaré Merit Medal
- Tamandaré-class frigate
