= 1824 =

1824 in various calendars
- Gregorian calendar: 1824; MDCCCXXIV
- Ab urbe condita: 2577
- Armenian calendar: 1273; ԹՎ ՌՄՀԳ
- Assyrian calendar: 6574
- Balinese saka calendar: 1745–1746
- Bengali calendar: 1230–1231
- Berber calendar: 2774
- British Regnal year: 4 Geo. 4 – 5 Geo. 4
- Buddhist calendar: 2368
- Burmese calendar: 1186
- Byzantine calendar: 7332–7333
- Chinese calendar: 癸未年 (Water Goat); 4521 or 4314 — to — 甲申年 (Wood Monkey); 4522 or 4315
- Coptic calendar: 1540–1541
- Discordian calendar: 2990
- Ethiopian calendar: 1816–1817
- Hebrew calendar: 5584–5585
- Hindu calendars
- Vikram Samvat: 1880–1881
- Shaka Samvat: 1745–1746
- Kali Yuga: 4924–4925
- Holocene calendar: 11824
- Igbo calendar: 824–825
- Iranian calendar: 1202–1203
- Islamic calendar: 1239–1240
- Japanese calendar: Bunsei 7 (文政７年)
- Javanese calendar: 1751–1752
- Julian calendar: Gregorian minus 12 days
- Korean calendar: 4157
- Minguo calendar: 88 before ROC 民前88年
- Nanakshahi calendar: 356
- Thai solar calendar: 2366–2367
- Tibetan calendar: ཆུ་མོ་ལུག་ལོ་ (female Water-Sheep); 1950 or 1569 or 797 — to — ཤིང་ཕོ་སྤྲེ་ལོ་ (male Wood-Monkey); 1951 or 1570 or 798

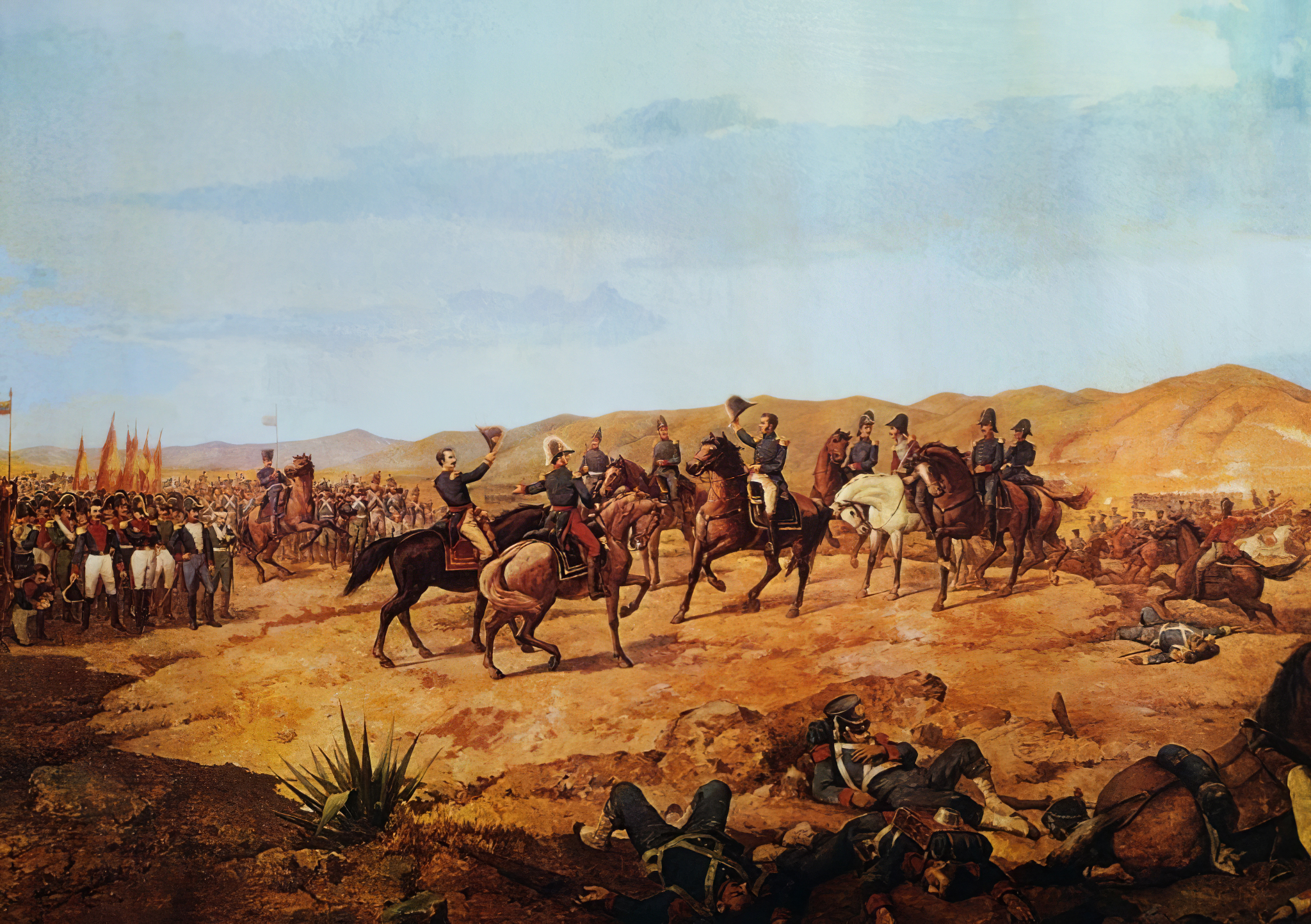
December 9: Spain's commanding General de la Serna surrenders to Sucre at the decisive Battle of Ayacucho in Peru.

1824 (MDCCCXXIV) was a leap year starting on Thursday of the Gregorian calendar and a leap year starting on Tuesday of the Julian calendar, the 1824th year of the Common Era (CE) and Anno Domini (AD) designations, the 824th year of the 2nd millennium, the 24th year of the 19th century, and the 5th year of the 1820s decade. As of the start of 1824, the Gregorian calendar was 12 days ahead of the Julian calendar, which remained in localized use until 1923.

== Events ==
=== January–March ===
- January 8 – After much controversy, Michael Faraday is finally elected as a member of the Royal Society in London, with only one vote against him.
- January 21 – First Anglo-Ashanti War: Battle of Nsamankow – forces of the Ashanti Empire crush British forces in the Gold Coast (modern-day Ghana), killing the British governor Sir Charles MacCarthy.
- February 10 – Simón Bolívar is proclaimed dictator of Peru.
- February 20 — William Buckland formally announces the name Megalosaurus, the first scientifically validly named non-avian dinosaur species.
- February 21 – The Chumash Revolt of 1824 begins against the Spanish presence in Alta California (now the U.S. state of California) as an uprising by the Chumash people at Mission Santa Inés (now Solvang, Mission Santa Barbara, and Mission La Purisima (now Lompoc in what is now Santa Barbara County, California. By June 28, the uprising ends after the Spanish government and the Chumash leaders reach a peace agreement.
- March 4 – The Royal National Lifeboat Institution is founded in the British Isles.
- March 5 – The First Anglo-Burmese War begins in much of what is now Bangladesh, and lasts for almost two years until the surrender of territories by the Kingdom of Burma on February 24, 1826.
- March 7 – In the Florida Territory, the announcement is made from St. Augustine that the capital will be moved to Tallahassee.
- March 9 – The Netherlands Trading Society (Netherlandsche Handel-Maatschappij), predecessor of the Dutch bank ABN AMRO, is founded.
- March 11 – The United States War Department creates the Bureau of Indian Affairs.
- March 17 – The Anglo-Dutch Treaty of 1824 is signed to resolve territorial disputes between the British Empire and the Netherlands over control of the Malay Peninsula and the Dutch East Indies (now Malaysia and Indonesia)
- March 19 – American explorer Benjamin Morrell departs Antarctica after a voyage later plagued by claims of fraud.

=== April–June ===
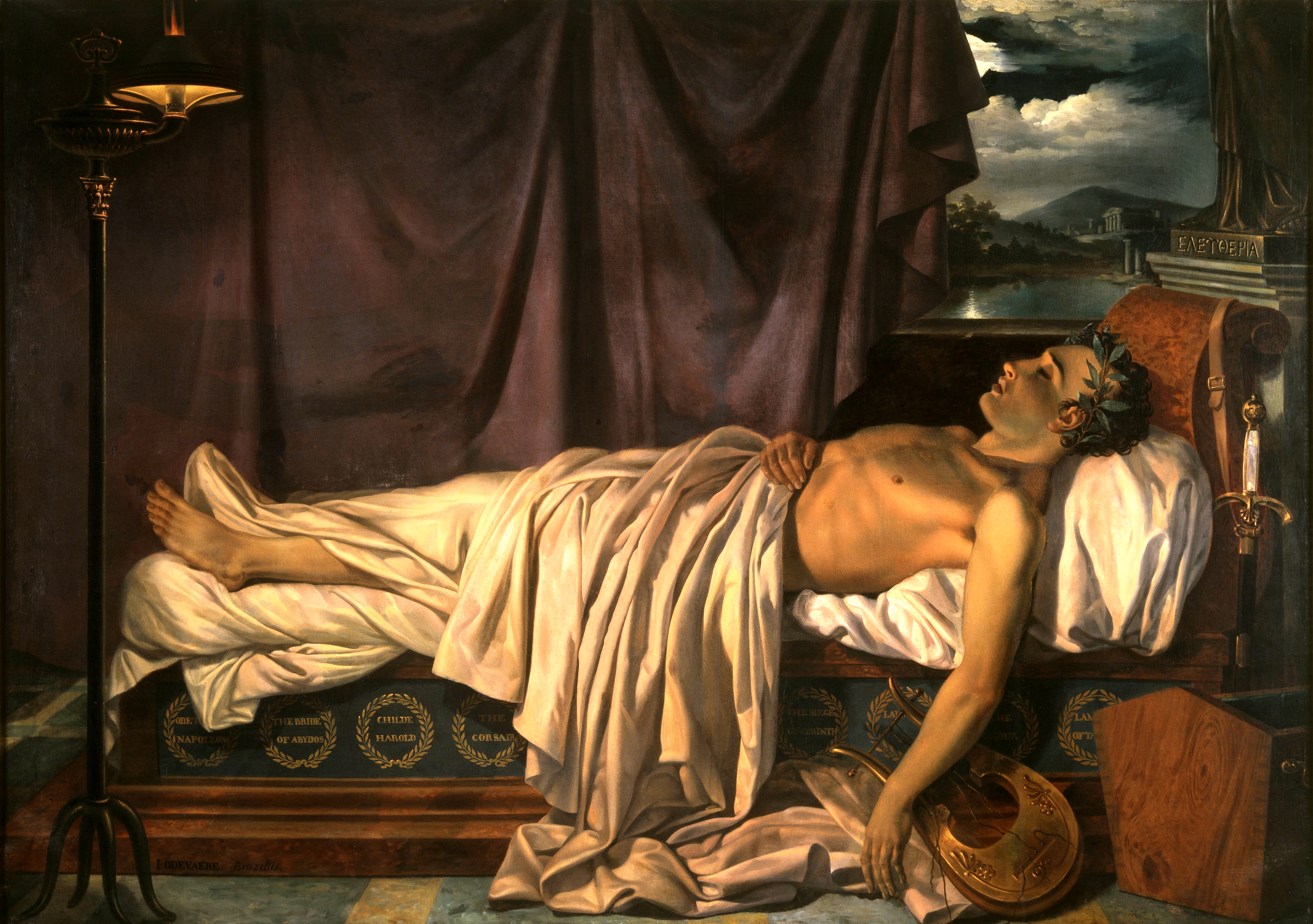
April 19: Death of Lord Byron

- April 7 – The Mechanics' Institution is established in Manchester, England at the Bridgewater Arms hotel, as part of a national movement for the education of working men. The institute is the precursor to two Universities in the city: the University of Manchester and the Metropolitan University of Manchester (MMU).
- April 9 – The first permanent settlers arrive to construct the new city of Tallahassee, Florida, selected to be the capital of the Florida Territory newly acquired from the Kingdom of Spain; the area has been selected because it is roughly equidistant from the territory's main cities, Pensacola and St. Augustine.
- April 19 – Lord Byron (George Gordon Byron), the British poet, dies at the age of 36 in the Greek city of Missolonghi, where he had taken ill while making plans to liberate the Greeks from Ottoman rule, "not in combat, but of a fever caught in the unhealthy conditions at Missolonghi... exacerbated, it is generally agreed, by the over-zealous actions of his doctors, who bled him excessively."
- April 30 – The April Revolt (La Abrilada) in Portugal begins when Prince Miguel acts against his Liberal opponents in defiance of his father John VI.
- May 7 – Ludwig van Beethoven's Ninth Symphony (the "Choral") premieres at the Theater am Kärntnertor in Vienna. The deaf composer has to be turned around on the stage to witness the enthusiastic audience reaction.
- May 24 – First Anglo-Burmese War: The British take Rangoon, capital of the Kingdom of Burma (now Yangon, Myanmar), in a surprise attack.
- June 16 – The Royal Society for the Prevention of Cruelty to Animals is established in Great Britain.

=== July–September ===
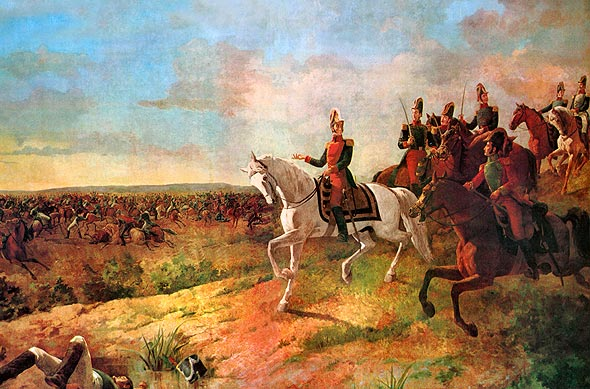
August 6: Battle of Junín

- July 2 – The Confederation of the Equator begins in Pernambuco, Brazil: Wealthy landowners against the government of Emperor Pedro I initiate a secessionist movement for the independence of Pernambuco.
- July 8 – Queen Kamāmalu of Hawaii dies of measles, while accompanying her husband during a visit to the United Kingdom.
- July 10 – Visit of the Marquis de Lafayette to the United States: Gilbert du Motier, Marquis de Lafayette and a beloved hero of the American Revolution, departs from the port of Le Havre in France on the ship Cadmus for a triumphant return to the United States; he arrives in New York on August 15.
- July 13 – King Kamehameha II of Hawaii dies of measles, during a visit to the United Kingdom, before he can meet with King George IV. Because of the slow communications of the era, news of the King's death does not reach Hawaii until the following March; his funeral would then take place on May 11, 1825, and subsequently he is succeeded by his brother Kamehameha III.
- July 19 – Don Agustín de Iturbide, who had formerly been President of Mexico and then proclaimed himself Emperor Agustin the First, until being overthrown on March 19, 1823, is executed by a firing squad in the city of Padilla, five days after returning from exile in England.
- July 25 – The Montparnasse Cemetery opens in Paris, France.
- August 6 – Peruvian War of Independence: Battle of Junín – Pro-independence forces defeat the Spanish in the highlands of the Junín region.
- August 7 – The First Anglo-Ashanti War ends when forces of the Ashanti Empire flee the field.
- August 15 – The visit of the Marquis de Lafayette to the United States begins at Staten Island. He will remain for more than a year before departing on September 7, 1825.
- September 13 – With his crew and 29 convicts aboard the Amity, John Oxley arrives at and founds the Moreton Bay Penal Settlement at what becomes Brisbane, Queensland, in Australia, after leaving Sydney.
- September 16 – Charles X succeeds his brother Louis XVIII as King of France.
- September 26 – The earliest reference by the British government to an official renaming of its South Pacific Ocean territory as "Australia" comes in a dispatch titled "Taking Possession of Melville and Bathurst Islands", as the Admiral Sir Gordon Bremer refers to "the North Coast of New Holland or Australia".

=== October–December ===
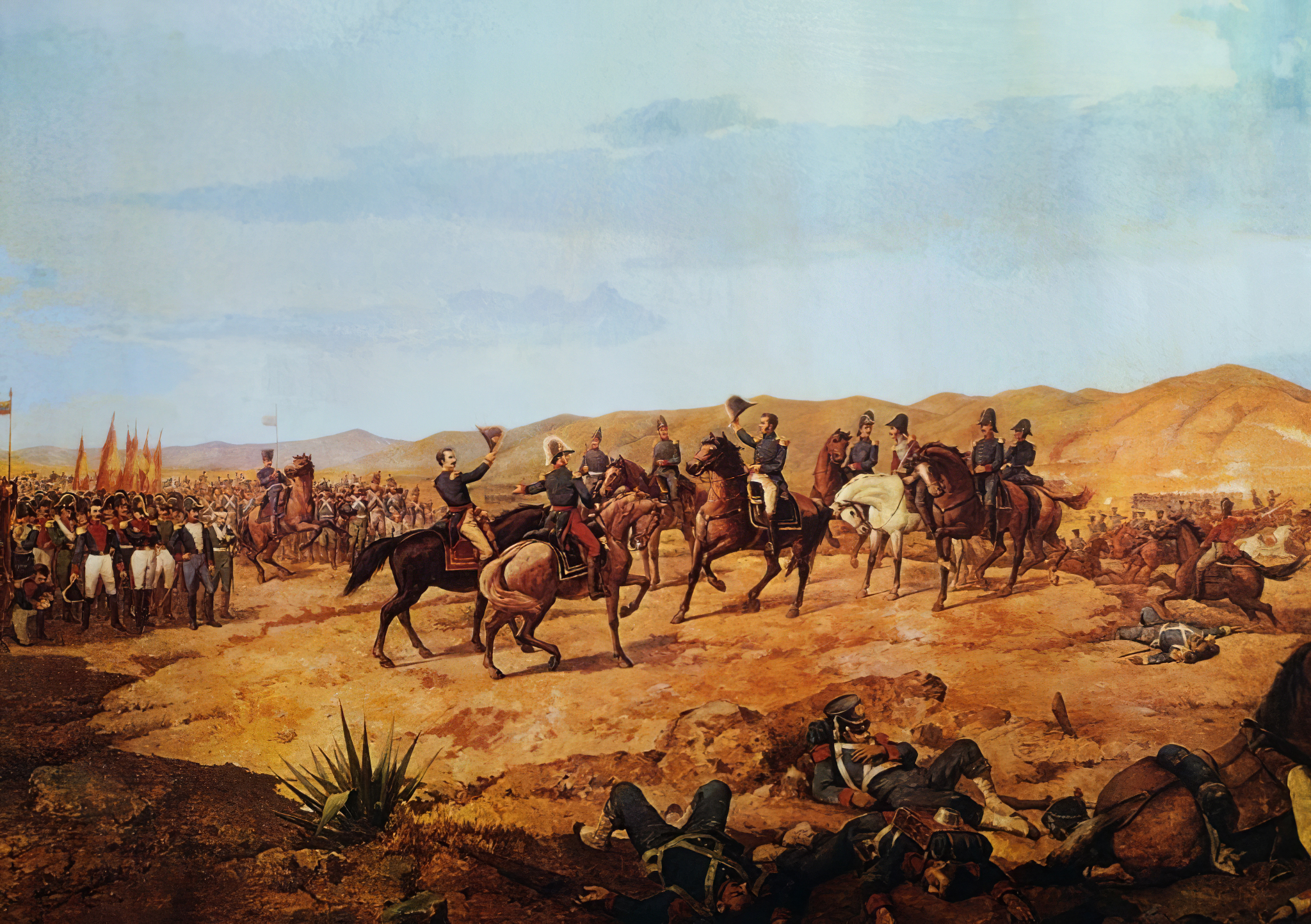
December 9: Battle of Ayacucho

- October 4 – The First Constitution of Mexico is ratified, declaring the country to be a federal republic called the United Mexican States (Estados Unidos Mexicanos).
- October 10 – The Edinburgh Town Council founds the Edinburgh Municipal Fire Brigade, the first fire brigade in Britain, under the leadership of James Braidwood.
- October 21 – Joseph Aspdin patents Portland cement, receiving BP 5,022 for An Improvement in the Mode of Producing an Artificial Stone.
- November 5 – Rensselaer Polytechnic Institute, the first technological university in the English-speaking world, is founded in Troy, New York.
- November 19 [O.S. November 7] – In the 1824 St. Petersburg flood, the worst up to that time in the Russian capital, Saint Petersburg, water rises 421 centimetres (166 in) above normal, and at least 200 people are killed.
- November 30 – The first sod is turned in Ontario for the first of four Welland Canals. The canal opens for a trial run five years later to the day, on November 30, 1829.
- December 3 – 1824 United States presidential election: None of the four candidates for U.S. president— Andrew Jackson, John Quincy Adams, Henry Clay or William H. Crawford— gain a majority of the electoral votes, although Jackson has a plurality of 40.5% of the popular vote. John C. Calhoun wins a majority of the electoral votes for Vice President. The election for President is carried out by the U.S. House of Representatives on February 9, 1825, pursuant to the Twelfth Amendment to the U.S. Constitution, with each of the 24 states having a vote, of which Adams receives 13 votes for the minimum majority necessary .
- December 9 – Peruvian War of Independence: Battle of Ayacucho – Colombian and Peruvian forces led by Antonio José de Sucre defeat the Spanish. The commander, Viceroy de la Serna, surrenders, ending Spain's domination of South America.
- December 24 – The first American social fraternity, Chi Phi (ΧΦ), is founded at Princeton University.
- December 28 – In Australia, in what is now New South Wales, the Bathurst War comes to an end, with the defeat of the Wiradjuri indigenous nation and the peaceful surrender of their leader, Chief Windradyne, at a feast at Parramatta.

=== Date unknown ===
- Egyptian and Albanian troops of the Ottoman Empire overturn the Greek revolt on Crete.
- The Dutch sign the Masang Agreement, temporarily ending hostilities in the Padri War.
- The name Australia, recommended by Matthew Flinders in 1804, is adopted by the British Admiralty as the official name of the country once known as New Holland.
- The Panoramagram is invented as the first stereoscopic viewer.
- The Colorado potato beetle is first described, by Thomas Say.

== Births ==
=== January–June ===
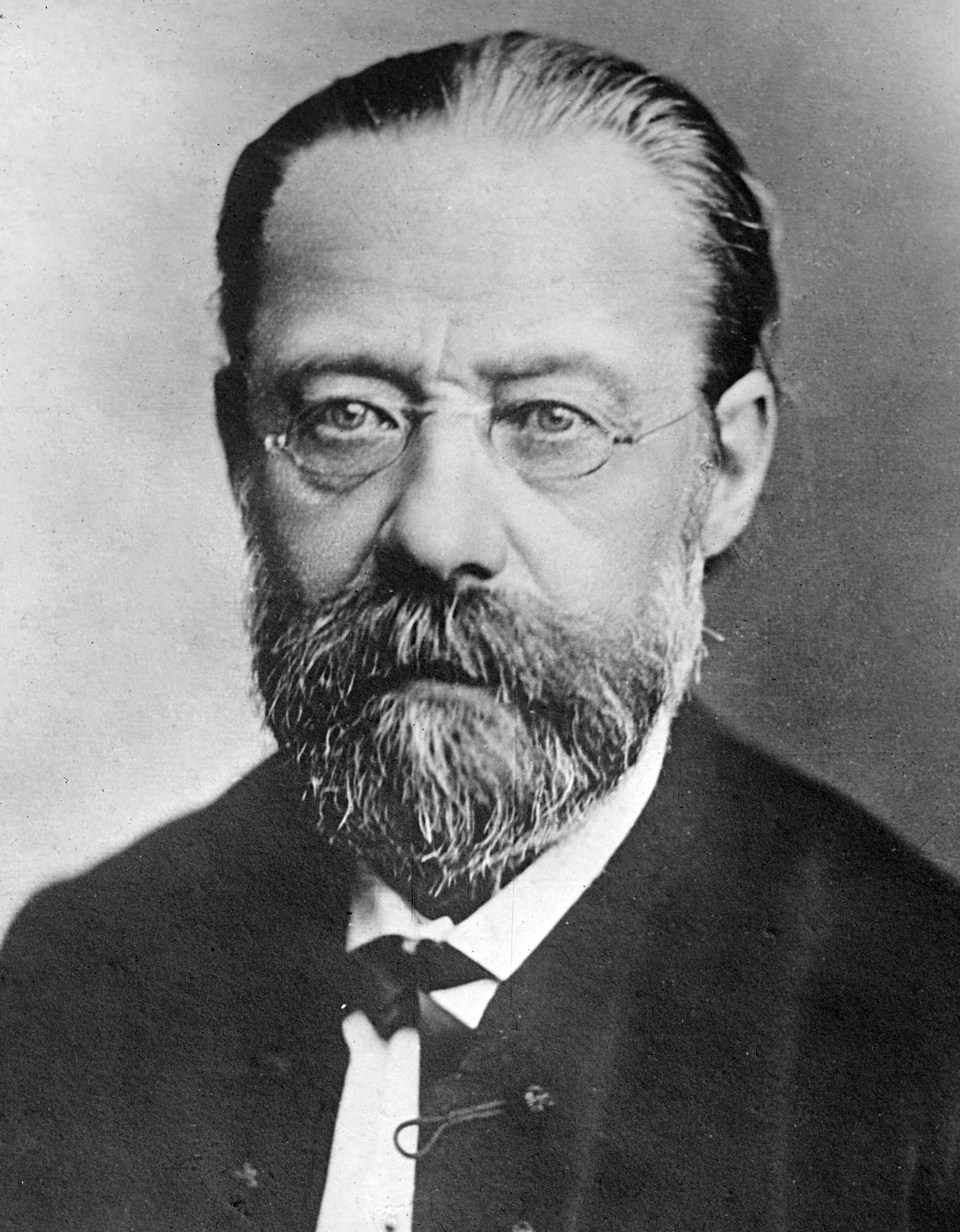
Bedřich Smetana

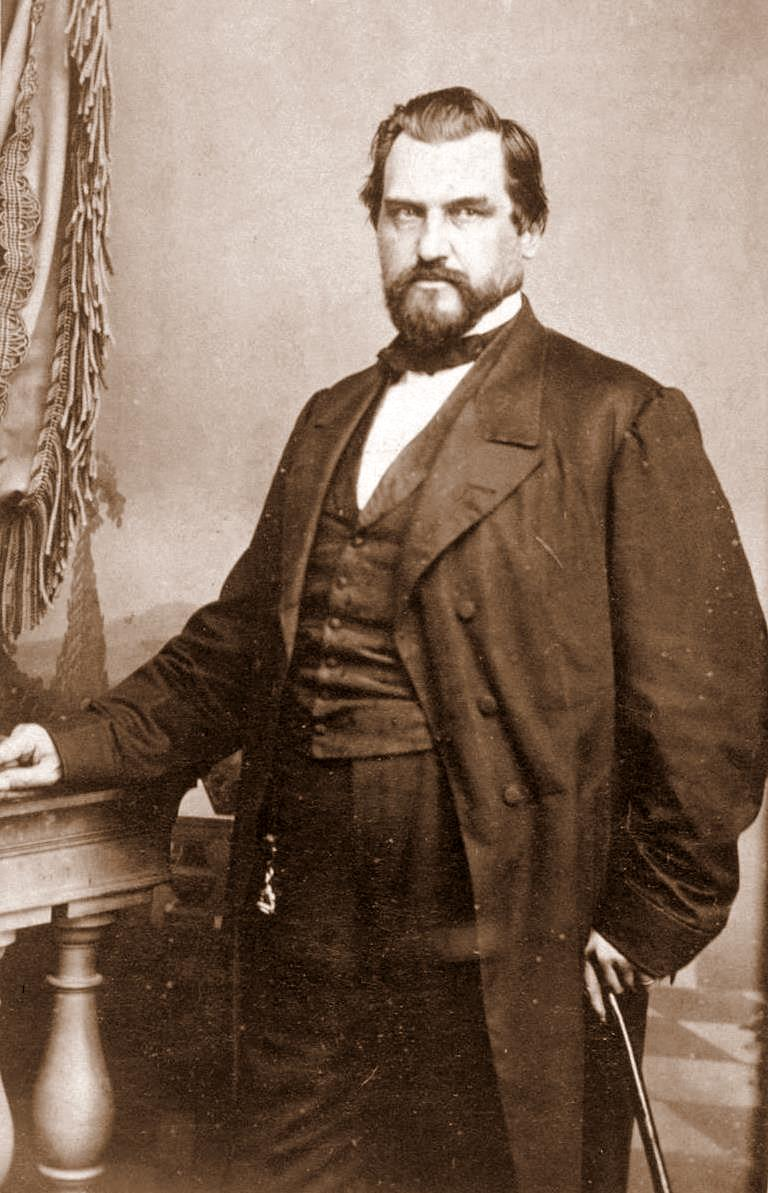
Amasa Leland Stanford

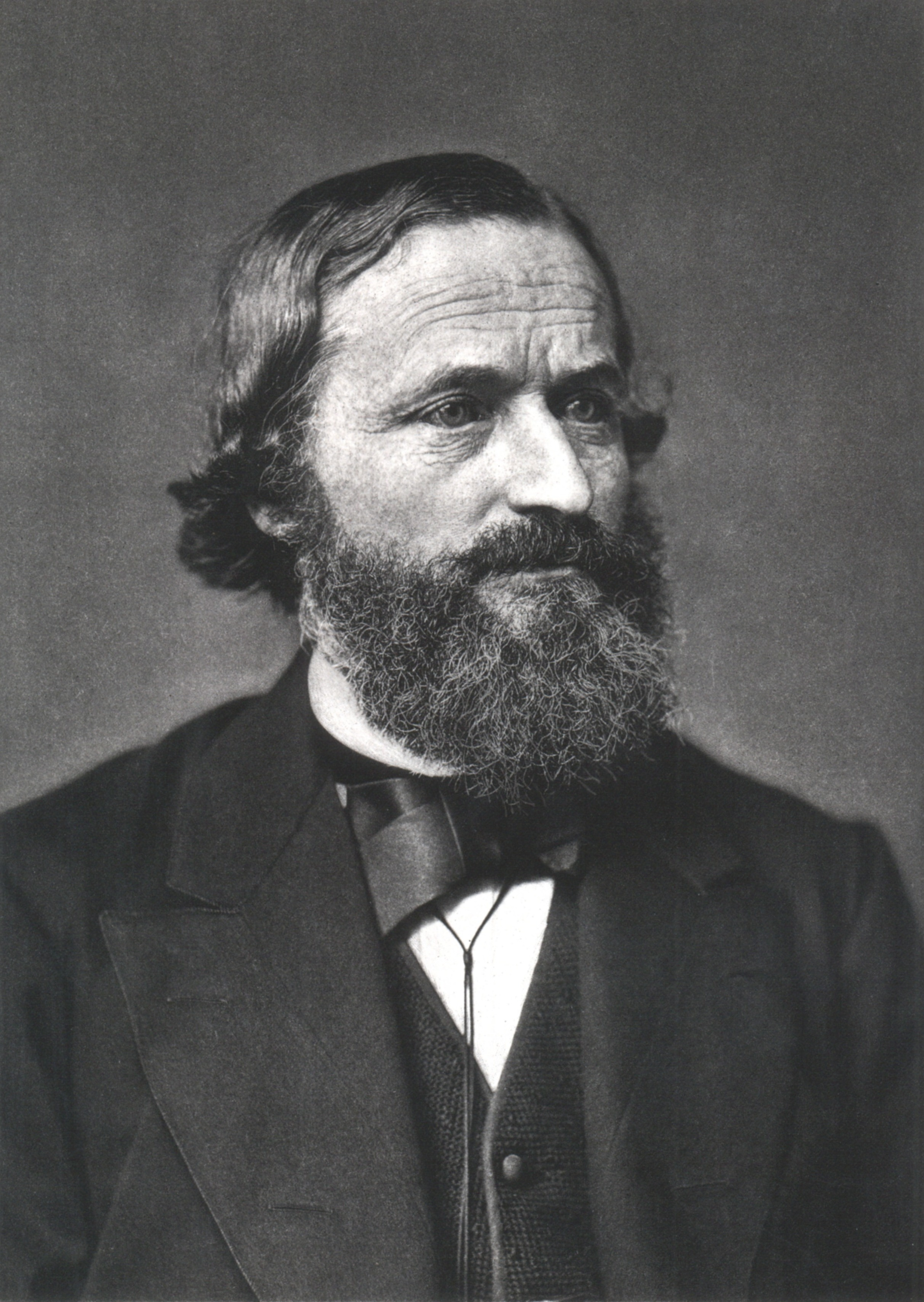
Gustav Kirchhoff

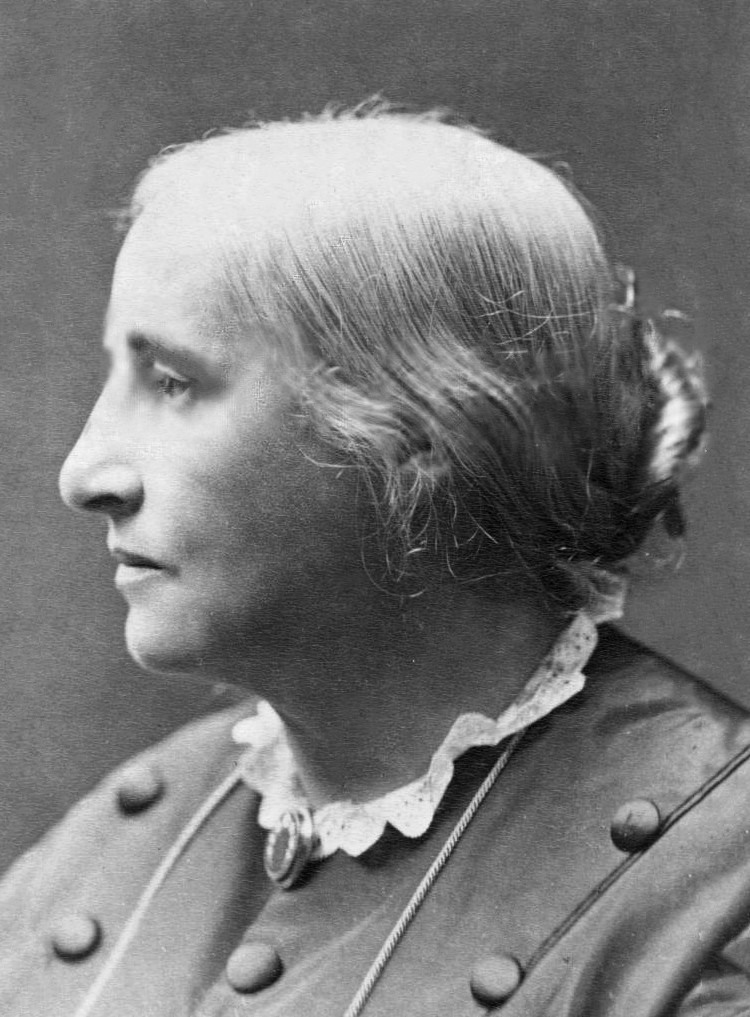
Ednah Dow Littlehale Cheney

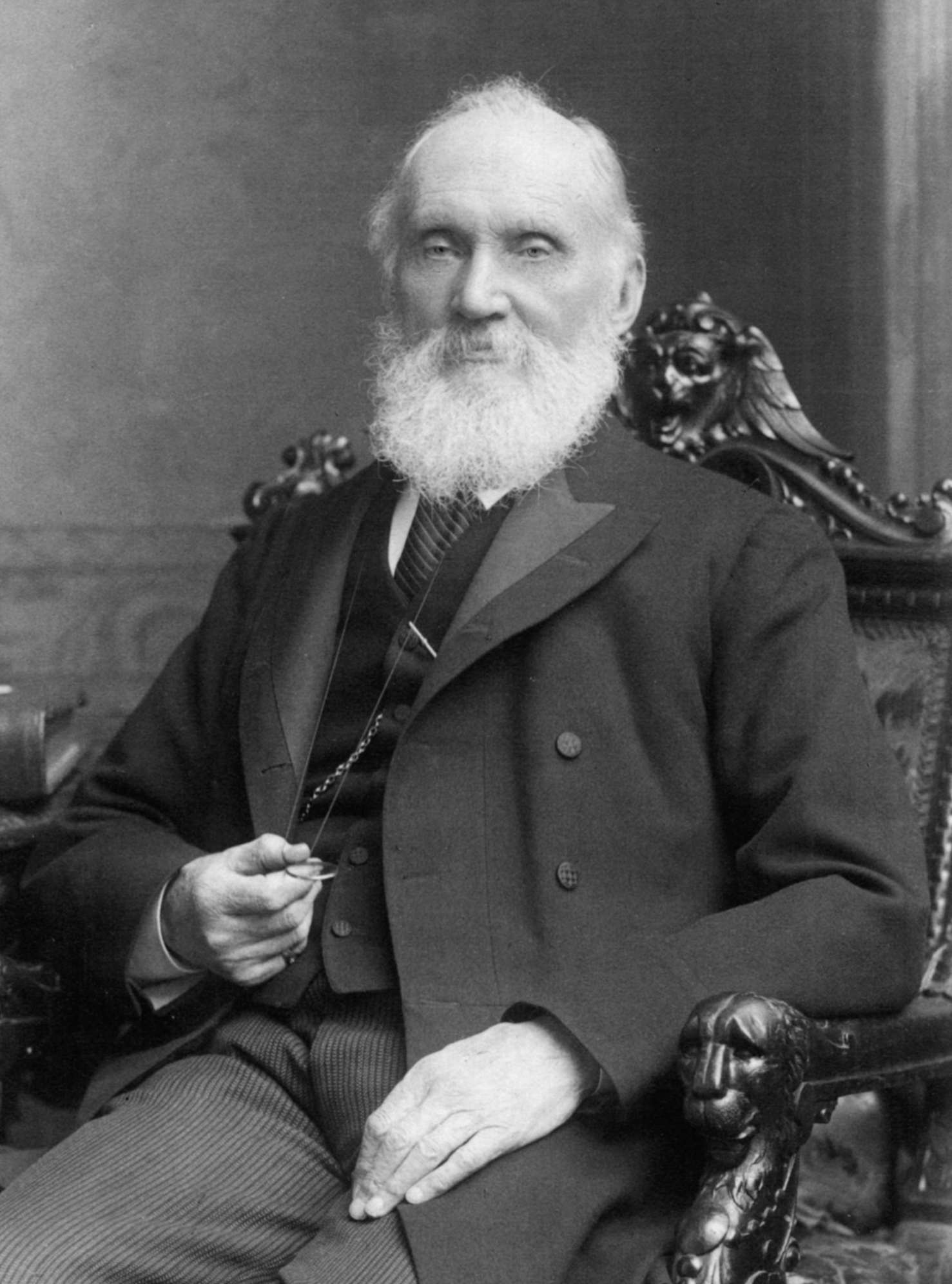
William Thomson, 1st Baron Kelvin

- January 7 – Julia Kavanagh, Irish novelist (d. 1877)
- January 8 – Wilkie Collins, English novelist (d. 1889)
- January 15 – Marie Duplessis, French courtesan (d. 1847)
- January 21 – Thomas Jonathan "Stonewall" Jackson, American Confederate general (d. 1863)
- January 26 – Emil Czyrniański, Polish chemist (d. 1888)
- February 7 – Sir William Huggins, British astronomer (d. 1910)
- February 8 – Barnard Elliott Bee, Jr., American Confederate general (d. 1861)
- February 12 – Dayananda Saraswati, Hindu religious leader, Vedic scholar who founded the reform movement Arya Samaj (d. 1883)
- February 14 – Winfield Scott Hancock, American Civil War Union general, Democratic presidential candidate (d. 1886)
- February 27 – Prince Kuni Asahiko of Japan (d. 1891)
- March 2 – Bedřich Smetana, Czech composer (d. 1884)
- March 9 – Amasa Leland Stanford, American tycoon, industrialist and politician, 8th Governor of California (d. 1893)
- March 12 – Gustav Kirchhoff, German physicist (d. 1887)
- March 19 – William Allingham, Irish author (d. 1889)
- March 22 – Charles Pfizer, German-American chemist, co-founder of Pfizer (d. 1906)
- March 25 – Clinton L. Merriam, American politician (d. 1900)
- March 26 – Julie-Victoire Daubié, French journalist (d. 1874)
- March 27 – Johann Wilhelm Hittorf, German physicist (d. 1914)
- April 6 – George Waterhouse, 7th Prime Minister of New Zealand (d. 1906)
- April 7 – Edward Jones, trespasser who continually broke into Buckingham Palace (d. 1895)
- April 13 – William Alexander, Anglican bishop, Primate of All Ireland (d. 1911)
- May 3 – Pio Siotto, Italian artist, cameo engraver (d. ?)
- May 6 – Tokugawa Iesada, 13th shōgun of Tokugawa shogunate of Japan (d. 1858)
- May 9 – Jacob ben Moses Bachrach, noted Polish-born apologist of Rabbinic Judaism (d. 1896)
- May 23 – Ambrose Burnside, American Civil War general, inventor, politician from Rhode Island (d. 1881)
- June 7 – Bernhard von Gudden, German neuroanatomist, psychiatrist (d. 1886)
- June 8 – Arthur von Mohrenheim, Russian diplomat (d. 1906)
- June 20 – George Edmund Street, British architect (d. 1881)
- June 26 – William Thomson, 1st Baron Kelvin, Irish-born physicist, engineer (d. 1907)
- June 27 – Ednah Dow Littlehale Cheney, American writer, reformer, philanthropist (d. 1904)
- June 28 – Paul Broca, French physician, anthropologist (d. 1880)

=== July–December ===
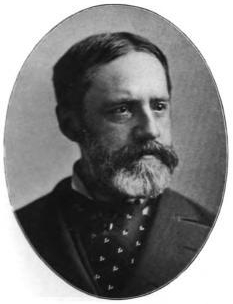
Edward Cooper

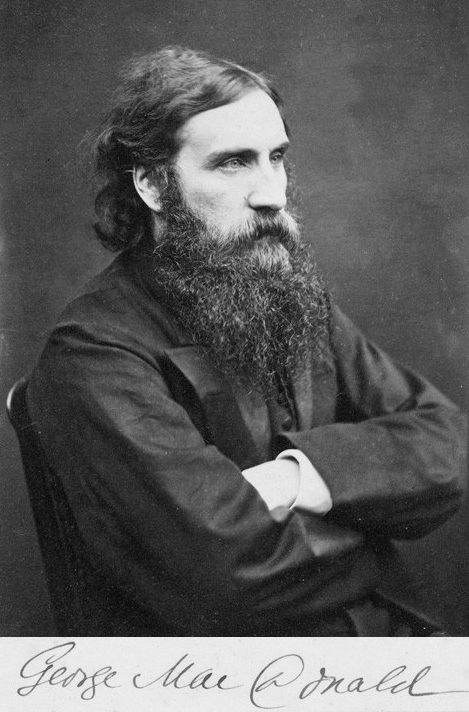
George MacDonald

- July 1 – Casto Méndez Núñez, Spanish admiral (d. 1869)
- July 12 – Eugène Boudin, French painter (d. 1898)
- July 19 – Horace W. Carpentier, American politician, 1st governor of Oakland, California (d. 1918)
- July 21 – Stanley Matthews, American politician, Associate Justice of the Supreme Court of the United States (d. 1889)
- July 27 – Alexandre Dumas, fils, French writer (d. 1895)
- August 3 – William Burnham Woods, Associate Justice of the Supreme Court of the United States (d. 1887)
- August 7 – Gideon T. Stewart, American temperance movement leader (d. 1907)
- August 13 – John J. Robison, American politician in Michigan (d. 1897)
- August 26 – Marie Simon, German nurse (d. 1877)
- September 4
  - Anton Bruckner, Austrian composer (d. 1896)
  - Phoebe Cary, American poet, sister to Alice Cary (1820–1871) (d. 1871)
- September 27 – Benjamin Apthorp Gould, American astronomer (d. 1896)
- October 2 – Henry C. Lord, American railroad executive (d. 1884)
- October 5 – Henry Chadwick, English-born American baseball writer, historian (d. 1908)
- October 18 – Juan Valera y Alcalá-Galiano, Spanish author (d. 1905)
- October 26 – Edward Cooper, 83rd Mayor of New York City (d. 1905)
- October 27 – Edward Maitland, British writer (d. 1897)
- November 20 – Sydenham E. Ancona, American educator, politician and member of the United States House of Representatives from 1861 to 1867 (d. 1913)
- November 24 – Frederick Miller, German-born American brewer, businessman (d. 1888)
- December 10 – George MacDonald, Scottish writer (d. 1905)
- December 11 – Jonathan Letterman, American surgeon, "Father of Battlefield Medicine" (d. 1872)
- December 14 – Pierre Puvis de Chavannes, French painter (d. 1898)
- December 18 – Sir John Hall, 12th Prime Minister of New Zealand (d. 1907)
- December 27 – Charlotta Norberg, Swedish ballerina (d. 1892)

== Deaths ==
=== January–June ===
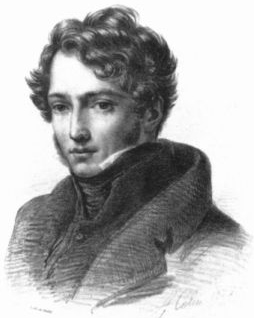
Théodore Géricault

- January 16 – Fabian Wrede, Swedish field marshal (b. 1760)
- January 21 – Jean-Baptiste Drouet, French revolutionary (b. 1765)
- January 26 – Théodore Géricault, French painter (b. 1791)
- January 29 – Princess Louise of Stolberg-Gedern, wife of Charles Edward Stuart (b. 1752)
- February 9 – Anne Catherine Emmerich, German Augustinian Canoness, mystic, Marian visionary, ecstatic and stigmatist (b. 1774)
- February 21 – Eugène de Beauharnais, son of Joséphine de Beauharnais (b. 1781)
- April 3 – Sally Seymour, American pastry chef and restaurateur
- April 19 – George Gordon Byron, 6th Baron Byron, English poet (b. 1788)
- May 15 – Johann Philipp Stadion, Count von Warthausen, German statesman (b. 1763)
- May 26 – Capel Lofft, English writer (b. 1751)
- May 29 – Jean-Baptiste Willermoz, French Freemason (b. 1730)
- June 16 – Charles-François Lebrun, duc de Plaisance, Third Consul of France (b. 1739)
- June 18 – Ferdinand III of Tuscany (b. 1769)
- June 21 – Étienne Aignan, French writer (b. 1773)

=== July–December ===
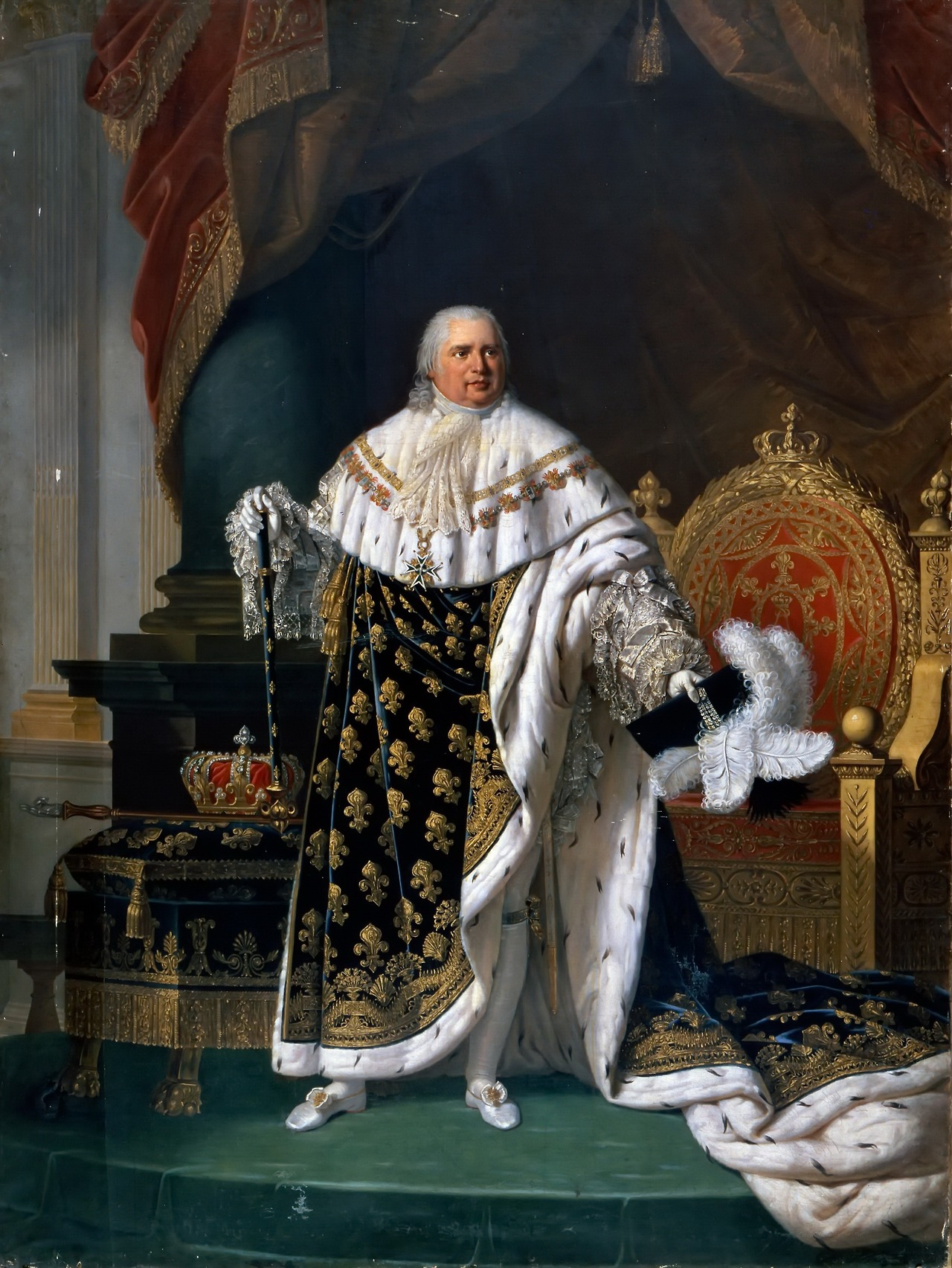
Louis XVIII

- July 14 – Kamehameha II, King of Hawaii (b. 1797)
- July 19
  - Agustín de Iturbide, Emperor of Mexico (b. 1783)
  - Alexander Pearce, Irish-born criminal transportee to Van Diemen's Land and cannibal, executed (b. 1790)
- July 20 – Maine de Biran, French philosopher (b. 1766)
- July 21 – Buddha Loetla Nabhalai (Rama II), King of Siam (Thailand) (b. 1767)
- August 12 – Charles Nerinckx, Belgian-born founder of the Sisters of Loretto (b. 1761)
- August 24 – Valentine Quin, 1st Earl of Dunraven and Mount-Earl, Irish politician (b. 1752)
- September 16 – King Louis XVIII of France (b. 1755)
- October 13 – Sir James Lamb, 1st Baronet of England (b. 1752)
- October 30 – Charles Maturin, Irish writer (b. 1773)
- December 5 – Anne Louise Boyvin d'Hardancourt Brillon de Jouy, French confidant of Benjamin Franklin (b. 1744)
- December 21 – James Parkinson, English surgeon, apothecary, geologist, palaeontologist and political activist (b. 1755)
- December 23 – Pushmataha, chief of the Choctaw Nation (b. c. 1764)

=== Dates unknown ===
- Ali-Qoli Khan Qajar, half-brother of Agha Mohammad Khan Qajar, the founder of the Qajar dynasty of Iran (b. c. 1756)
