= Bacharach (surname) =

Bacharach, also Bachrach, is a German Jewish surname, referring to the medieval town of Bacharach. Notable people with this surname include the following:

- Abraham Samuel Bacharach (c. 1575–1615), German Rabbi
- Alfred Louis Bacharach (1891–1966), British food scientist and music historian
- Arthur J. Bachrach (1926–2011), American psychologist
- Bernard S. Bachrach (1939–2023), American historian
- Bill Bachrach (1879–1959), American swimming and water polo coach
- Burt Bacharach (1928–2023), American composer, songwriter, and pianist
- Ebon Moss-Bachrach (born 1977), American actor
- Emanuel Bachrach-Barée (1863–1943), German painter
- Eva Bacharach (c. 1580–1651), Hebraist and rabbinical scholar
- Harry Bacharach (1873–1947), American politician and mayor of Atlantic City, New Jersey
- Howard Bachrach (1920–2008), American scientist
- Isaak Bacharach (1854–1942), German mathematician
- Isaac Bacharach (1870–1956), American politician from New Jersey who represented the 2nd congressional district from 1915 to 1937
- Jacob ben Moses Bachrach (1824–1896), Polish rabbi
- Judah Bachrach (c. 1775–1846), rabbi
- Louis Fabian Bachrach Jr. (1917–2010), American photographer
- Marion Bachrach (1898–1957), American Communist activist in the 1930s
- Raymond Louis Bacharach (born 1945), German pornographer known as John Thompson of "JT Productions"
- Robert E. Bacharach (born 1959), American judge
- Shel Bachrach (1944–2024), American insurance broker, investor, businessman and philanthropist
- Steven Bachrach, organic chemist
- Walt Bachrach (1904–1989), American politician, mayor of Cincinnati, Ohio in the 1960s
- Yair Bacharach (1639–1702), German rabbi
