= Bacharach (disambiguation) =

Bacharach is a town in western Germany.

Bacharach (or Bachrach) may also refer to:

- Bacharach (surname)
  - Burt Bacharach, American songwriter and composer
- Bacharach Giants, a former professional baseball team that played in the Negro leagues
- Cayley–Bacharach theorem
- Bachrach Studios

== See also ==
- Baccarat (disambiguation)
