= Aaron ben Moses Teomim =

Czech-Polish rabbinical scholar

Aaron ben Moses Teomim (c. 1630 – July 8, 1690), was a Czech-Polish rabbinical scholar. While a preacher at Prague, he was called as rabbi to Worms in 1670, later holding the rabbinical seat of Cracow (Kraków), Poland. Soon after taking up the Cracow post, a politically- or financially-motivated order for his arrest was made: His death occurred as a result of mistreatment during his transfer to prison. Works published during his lifetime included scriptural discourse and commentary; his work on the Haggadah was reprinted several times in the decades after his death. Later, his approach to textual analysis and discussion, pilpulism, fell into disfavour.

== Background and career ==
Aaron ben Moses Teomim was born about 1630, probably in Prague, where the Teomim-Fränkel family from Vienna, had settled. In 1670 he was called as rabbi to Worms, where he succeeded Moses Samson Bacharach. Prior to this he had been a preacher at Prague. In 1677 Aaron received a call to Lissa (Leszno) in Poland, which he declined; but in 1690 he accepted a call to the rabbinical seat of Cracow (Kraków). He was there but three months when a Polish nobleman, probably in order to blackmail the congregation, ordered his arrest in Chmelnik, whither he had gone to attend the meeting of the Council of Four Lands (Arba' Araẓot).

=== Works and legacy ===
In a serious illness which overcame him on Passover evening, 1675, he vowed he would write a commentary on the Haggadah if he should be restored to health. On his recovery he published this commentary under the title Maṭṭeh Aharon ('Aaron's Rod'; Frankfurt, 1678). Another work, Bigde Aharon ('Aaron's Vestments'), homilies on the Pentateuch, was published after the author's death at Frankfurt-on-the-Main, 1710. His Glosses on Shulḥan 'Aruk, Ḥoshen Mishpaṭ remained in manuscript. Responsa of his are found in the collections of Yair Bacharach, Ḥawwot Yair, and in those of Eliakim Goetz ben Meir of Hildesheim (fl. c. 1700), Eben ha-Shoham (Dyhernfurth, 1733).

In his rabbinical works, Teomim uses typical pilpulistic methodology. His scholastic discourses are in accordance with the vogue of that age. That his theories, as exhibited in his treatment of the Haggadah, were appreciated by his contemporaries, is proved by the fact that his Haggadah was reprinted three times: at Amsterdam, in 1695; at Frankfurt-am-Main, in 1710; at Amsterdam, in 1712. Yair Bacharach, who may have had reason to resent Teomim, having laid claim – in succession to his father and grandfather – to the rabbinate of Worms, that Teomim was instead called to occupy, (Note: Yair Bacharach was appointed rabbi of Worms in 1699, serving until his death in 1702.) severely criticised Teomim's Mateh Ahron; this was published posthumously in the first volume of Bikkurim, a periodical edited by Naphtali Keller.

== Death ==
Only a few months after his arrival in Cracow, on the Sabbath, July 8, 1690, while attending the congregational meeting of the Council of Four Lands, he was arrested upon the order of a local noble, in what was probably an attempt to coerce or extort the congregation. In hurrying Teomim to prison, he was placed on horseback, from which he fell several times and was as often remounted. Before the jail was reached, he had died of fright and ill-treatment at Chmielnik, (Note: Sources do not clearly specify in which Chmielnik Teomim's death occurred; there are several Chmielniks in Poland, and elsewhere. Haberman (2007) and Deutsch (1901) state only "Chmielnik, Poland", while elsewhere in the Jewish Encyclopedia (1903), it is mentioned that the Council of Four Lands, where Teomim was going when he met his death, convened at Lublin, or Jarosław, and, in "exceptional cases, (rarely) ... in other cities ...". There is a Chmielnik near Lublin, another close to Jarosław and another close to Pińczów (Where he was buried) .) Poland, and was buried at Pintchov (Pińczów).
