= Museum of the History of Kokshetau =

History museum in Kokshetau, Kazakhstan

- Kazakh: Көкшетау қаласының тарихы мұражайы
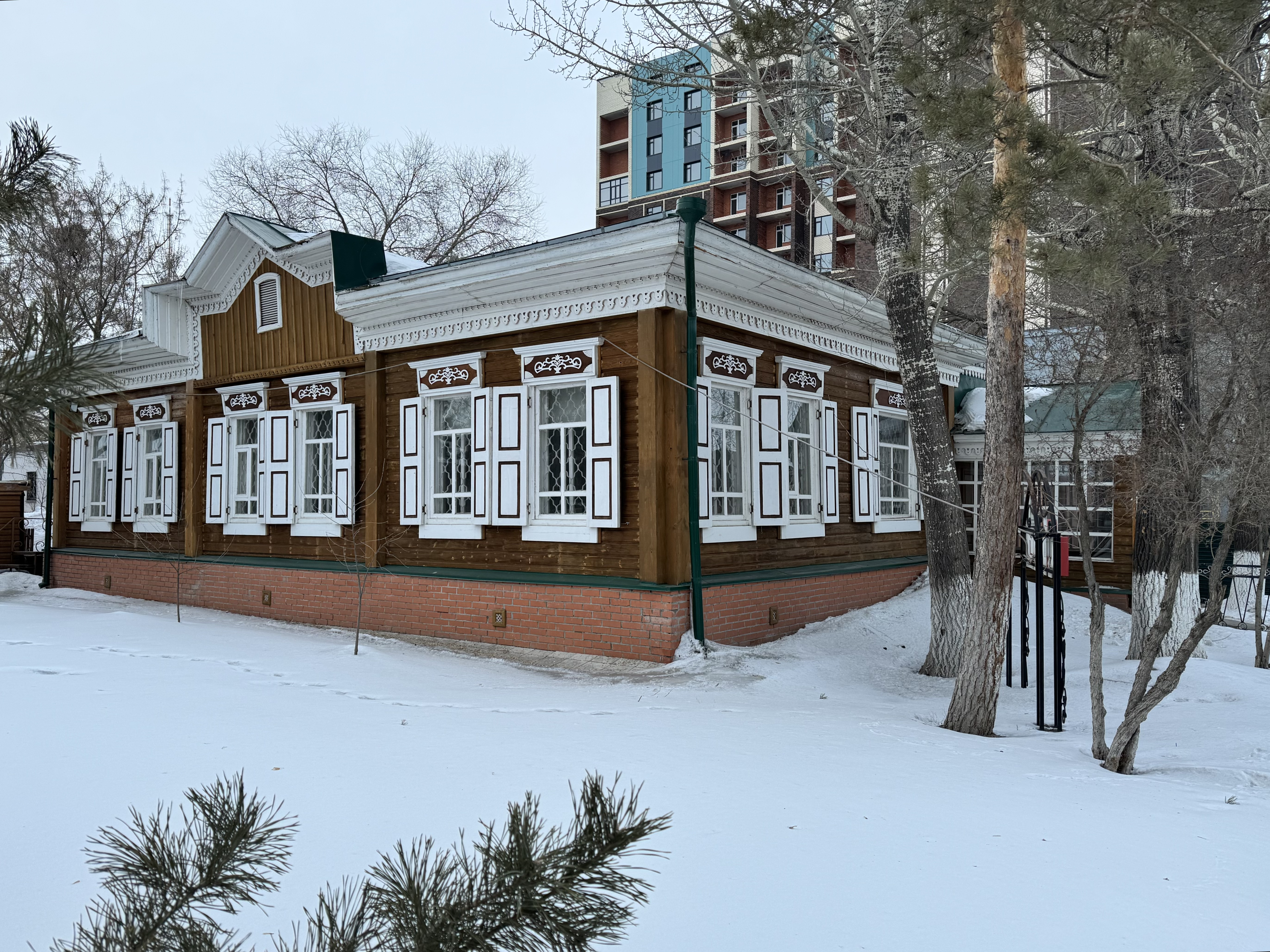
- Location: Kokshetau (headquarters)
- Type: History museum
- Website: www.museum-kokshetau.kz

The Museum of the History of Kokshetau (Kazakh: Көкшетау қаласының тарихы мұражайы, romanized: Kökşetau qalasynyñ tarihy mūrajaiy; Russian: Музей истории города Кокшетау) is a history museum that conserves, researches, communicates and exhibits the historical heritage of the city of Kokshetau in Kazakhstan, from its origins until the present day, with a particular focus on social history.

== Description ==
The museum store more than 16 thousand exhibits. This yellowed with time, old photographs, documents, manuscripts, daily life and material culture objects that can tell a lot about the life of the city and its inhabitants in the past.

=== Galleries ===
The 5 smaller halls of the museum in chronological sequence reflects the main milestones of the history of Kokshetau, since its inception in 1824 to the present time. The exhibition introduces the city of Kokshetau 19 - 20th century, with the history of its economy, industry, health, education, culture, the life of the people who contributed to the development of the city.

=== History ===
The Museum of the History of Kokshetau was founded in 2000 on the shores of Lake delves into the ancient part of the city. The museum is located on Kanai Bi Street, which until 2008 was called Chapaev Street, in the house where in 1947 a memorial museum located statesman Kuibyshev. The museum building is a historical monument and is under state protection.

In 2004, the 180th anniversary of the city was opened exhibition of the museum, which included more than 11,000 items. It presented the highlights of the history of Kokshetau, since its formation in 1824 until today. The most unusual exhibits is German bicycle and American car "Cadillac", which were made at the beginning of the XX century. The museum opened a separate room dedicated to the Great Patriotic War, in which visitors can see the medals and orders, letters and device Heroes War.
