= Tobias Cohn =

Polish-Jewish physician

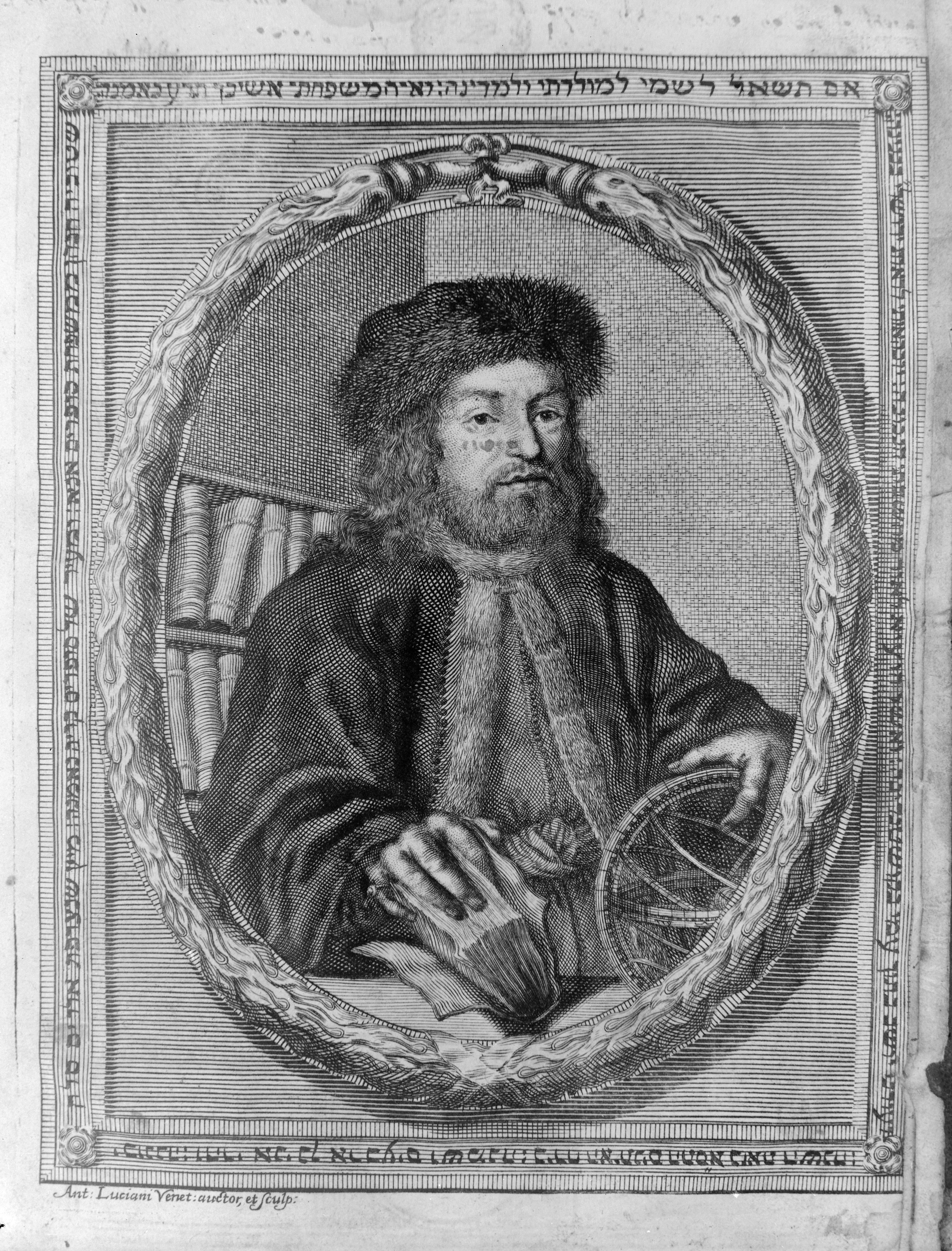
Tobias Cohn

Tobias Cohn or Tobias Kohn (in Hebrew, Toviyyah ben Moshe ha-Kohen, Tuvia Harofeh – Tuvia the doctor; in Polish, Tobiasz Kohn) (also referred to as Toviyah Kats) (1652–1729) was a Polish-Jewish physician of the seventeenth and eighteenth centuries. He was born at Metz in 1652.

== Biography ==
Cohn's grandfather was the physician Eleazar Cohn, who emigrated from the Holy Land to Poland, and settled in Kamenetz-Podolsk, where he practised medicine until his death. His father was the Polish rabbi and physician Moses Kohn of Narol, in the district of Bielsk, who moved to Metz in 1648 to escape persecution during the Chmielnicki Uprising and became rabbi there. After his father's death, Phega, Cohn's mother, married Moses Samson Bacharach, rabbi of Worms, and Cohen become the step brother of the famous rabbi Yair Bacharach. His mother, Phega, Tobias and his elder brother returned to Poland after the death of their father in 1673. He received his education at Kraków and the universities of Frankfort-on-the-Oder (at the expense of the great elector of Brandenburg) and Padua, graduating from the latter as doctor of medicine. He practised for some time in Poland, and moved later to Adrianople, where he became physician to five successive Ottoman sultans— Mehmed IV, Suleiman II, Ahmed II, Mustafa II, and Ahmed III, moving with the court to Constantinople. In 1724 he went to Jerusalem, where he lived until his death in 1729.

== Writings ==
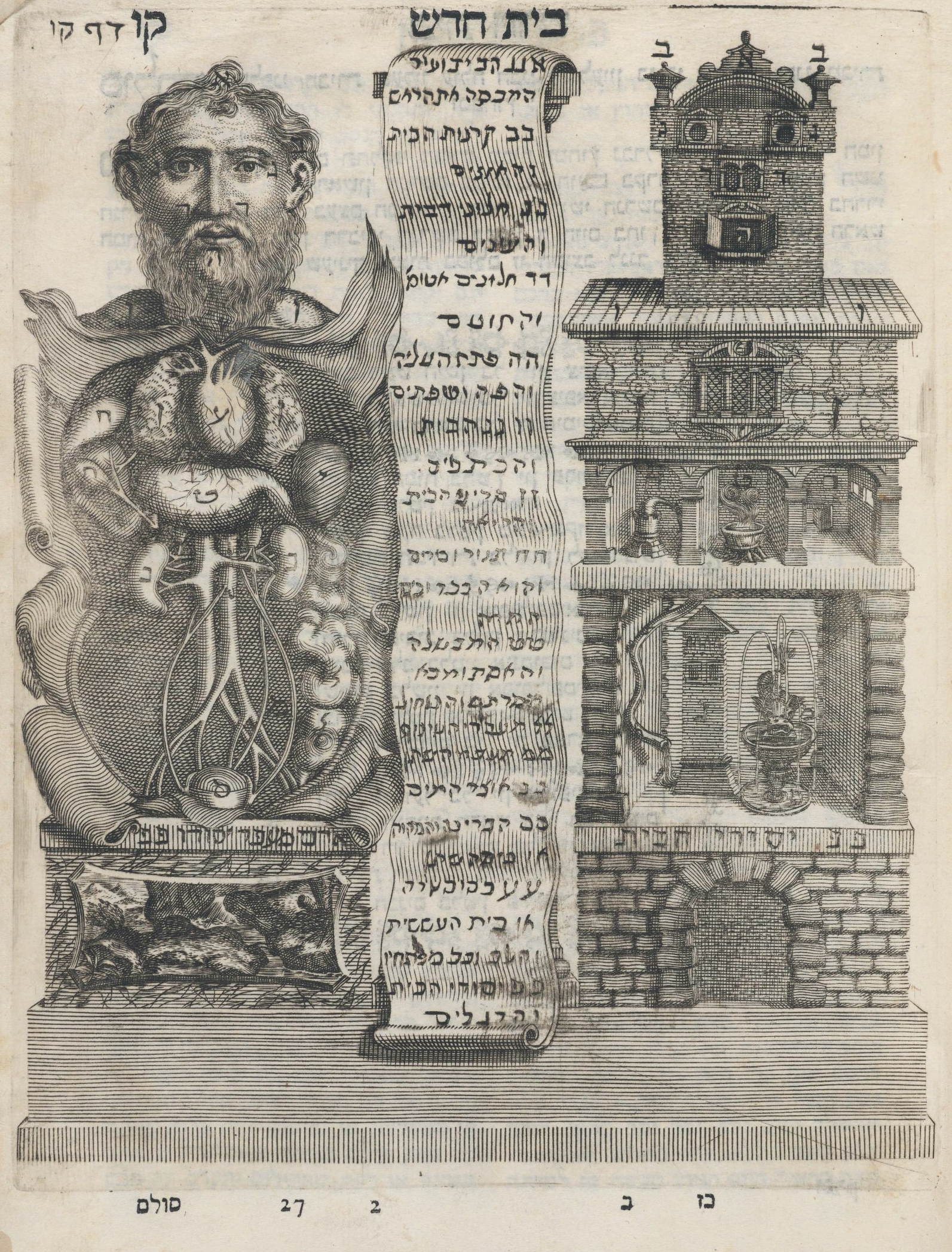
The House of the Body. An allegorical design comparing the organs of the body to the divisions of a house, from Cohn's Ma'aseh Toviyyah (1708)

Cohn was familiar with ten languages – Hebrew, German, Polish, Italian, French, Spanish, Turkish, Latin, Greek, and Arabic. This great linguistic knowledge made it possible for him to write his Ma'aseh Toviyyah (Work of Tobias), published in Venice in 1707, and reprinted there in 1715, 1728, 1769, and 1850. The work is encyclopedic, and is divided into eight parts: (1) theology; (2) astronomy; (3) medicine; (4) hygiene; (5) syphilitic maladies; (6) botany; (7) cosmography; and (8) an essay on the four elements.

The most important is the third part, which contains an illustration showing a human body and a house side by side and comparing the members of the former to the parts of the latter (see illustration).

In part 2 are found an astrolabe and illustrations of astronomical and mathematical instruments. Inserted between parts 6 and 7 is Turkish-Latin-Spanish dictionary; and prefixed to the work is a poem by Solomon Conegliano.

Cohn's medical knowledge and experiences seem to have been of considerable importance. He gave, from his own observations, the first description of the "plica polonica," as well as many local symptoms and newly discovered medicinal herbs. He also published in three languages a list of remedies.
