= Baccara (disambiguation) =

Baccara was a Spanish female vocal duo.

Baccara may also refer to:

- Baccara (album), debut studio album by the Spanish duo Baccara
- Baccara (card game), a card game
- Baccara (film), a 1935 French comedy film directed by Yves Mirande
- Rosa 'Black Baccara', a deep red rose

== See also ==
- Baccarat (disambiguation)
