= Jacob ben Moses Bachrach =

Jacob ben Moses Bachrach (born in Seiny, in the governorate of Suwalki, which is now in Poland, May 9, 1824; died in Bialystok December 29, 1896) was a noted apologist of Rabbinic Judaism. He was descended from Rabbi Yair Chayim Bacharach, and in turn from the Maharal of Prague.

He received his earliest instruction from his grandfather, Judah Bachrach. For years he was superintendent of a Hebrew printing-establishment in Königsberg, where he edited, among other works, the Ṭurim of Jacob ben Asher, and added notes to the same. Later on he became manager of a distillery in Sevastopol, where he had the opportunity to develop into an assiduous student of Karaitic literature, and where he engaged in controversies with the representatives of the local Karaitic community. His works are chiefly devoted to a defense of rabbinical tradition against Karaism. In 1882 he went to Palestine in the interest of colonization.

== Published works ==
- Ha-yaḥas Liketab Ashuri (History of the Assyrian Script), Warsaw, 1854, a polemical treatise against Elia Levita's theory that vowel points and accents originated in post-Talmudic times.
- To the same purpose is devoted his Ishtadalut 'im Shadal (An Engagement with ShaDaL), 2 vols., Warsaw, 1896—in which he again attempts to refute Shadal/Luzzatto's view, based on that of Levita, that the vowel points are the invention of the Masoretes.
- Maämare Jacob ha-Bakri (Essays of Jacob Bachrach), Warsaw, 1893, 2 vols., is a work devoted to proving that the Hebrew calendar is of ancient origin, and he opposes the arguments of the Karaites, of Slonimsky, and of others, who asserted that the ancient Israelites reckoned by the solar year.
- Ha-Massa' la-Areẓ ha-Ḳedoshah, his description of his journey to Palestine, 2d ed., Kiev, 1884.
