= Ma'aseh Toviyyah =

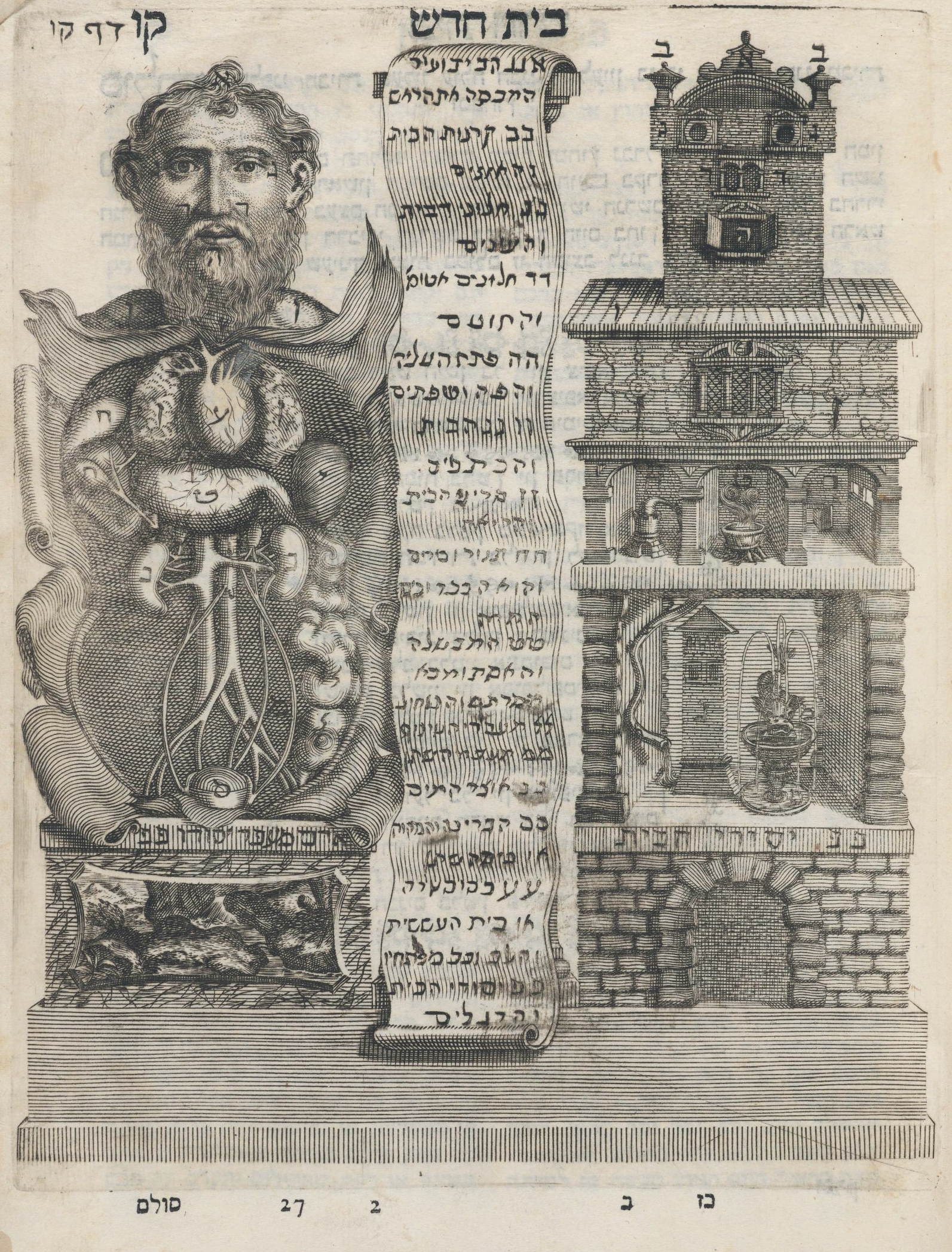
The House of the Body. An allegorical design comparing the organs of the body to the divisions of a house. From Cohn's Ma'aseh Toviyyah, 1707.)

Ma'aseh Toviyyah or Ma'aseh Tobiyyah (Hebrew: מעשה טוביה, lit. 'Work of Tobias') was an encyclopedic scientific reference book written by Tobias Cohn. It was published in Venice, Italy, in 1707, and reprinted there in 1715, 1728, 1769, and 1850.

== Contents ==
The work is divided into eight parts: (1) theology; (2) astronomy; (3) medicine; (4) hygiene; (5) Syphilitic maladies; (6) botany; (7) cosmography; and (8) an essay on the four elements. The most important is the third part, which contains an illustration showing a human body and a house side by side and comparing the members of the former to the parts of the latter (see illustration).

== Illustrations and dictionary ==
In part 2 are found an astrolabe and illustrations of astronomical and mathematical instruments. Inserted between parts 6 and 7 is Turkish-Latin-Spanish dictionary; and prefixed to the work is a poem by Solomon Conegliano.
