= Moses Samson Bacharach =

Czech-German rabbi

- Born: 1607; South Moravia, Czech Republic
- Died: April 19, 1670 (aged 62–63)

Moses Samson Bacharach (1607 – April 19, 1670) was a rabbi and the son of Samuel and Eva Bacharach. He was born in South Moravia, Czech Republic. After the death of his father his mother took him to Prague, where he was educated by his maternal uncle, Ḥayyim ha-Kohen. In 1627 he married Dobrusch, a daughter of Isaac ben Phœbus, of Ungarisch-Brod, Moravia, where he lived supported by his wealthy father-in-law. The Thirty Years' War brought about the ruin of his father-in-law's business, and Samson was compelled to accept a rabbinical position in Göding, Moravia, in 1629.

In 1635 he became rabbi of Leipnik, Moravia, and remained there until the capture of the city by the Swedish army in 1643 scattered the congregation and forced him to return to Prague. Here he was made preacher, but during the siege of the city in 1648 found himself compelled to retreat to the country for safety. Returning after the war, he remained in Prague until 1650, when he was called to the rabbinate of Worms, which position he occupied up to the time of his death. After the death of his wife in 1662 he married Feige in 1664, the widow of Moses ha-Kohen Nerol, rabbi of Metz, who died in 1659 and the mother of the famous jewish physician Tobias Cohn. He left one son, Jair Ḥayyim Bacharach, and four daughters. Of his literary works there exist a number of responsa published in his son's Ḥuṭ ha-Shani, Frankfurt, 1679, and also some religious poems.

His commentary on R. Asher's Halakot is lost.
