= Baccarat (disambiguation) =

Baccarat is a card game.

Baccarat may also refer to:

- Canton of Baccarat, Meurthe-et-Moselle department, France
  - Baccarat, Meurthe-et-Moselle, a commune and seat of the canton
- Baccarat (company), manufacturer of crystal based in the commune
- Baccarat Hotels and Resorts company, owned by Starwood Capital Group
- Baccarat (1919 film), a German silent drama film
- Baccarat (1929 film), a French silent comedy film

== See also ==
- Baccara, Spanish disco duo
- Baccara (disambiguation)
