= John J. Robison =

Michigan politician

John J. Robison (1824–1897) was a 19th-century Michigan politician who was the mayor of Ann Arbor from 1886 to 1887. He also served as a state senator and county clerk.

== Biography ==
Robison was born on August 13, 1824 in Phelps, New York to mother Gertrude Hoag and father Andrew Robison, both devoted Presbyterians. Andrew was originally a currier and tanner, but later became involved in general farming.

In 1843, Robison moved with his family to Sharon, Michigan. He was a schoolteacher in Sharon and Manchester for 18 terms, after which he devoted more attention to farming. On May 2, 1847, Robison married Altha E. Gillett and they subsequently had five children together.

Robison began dabbling in politics in 1862 when he was first elected to the Michigan Senate. He was re-elected in 1864, and in 1866 he was re-nominated for the position but declined to run. Robison was elected as County Clerk of Washtenaw County in 1868 and again in 1870. He was a delegate for the 1872 Democratic National Convention in Baltimore. He was also nominated for a seat in the U.S. Congress in 1874 and 1876, but was defeated both times. In 1878, Robison was elected to the Michigan House of Representatives.

Robison moved to Ann Arbor upon being elected County Clerk in 1882, with his term commencing on January 1, 1883; he was re-elected to the post in 1884. In 1886, he was elected mayor of Ann Arbor and served for one term.

In 1887, Robison bought the Main Street Jail in Ann Arbor and turned it into his family home. Robison died on Tuesday, October 26, 1897 at 6 a.m.
