= Panoramagram =

The panoramagram is an instrument invented in 1824 and a method of stereoscopic viewing in which the left-eye and right-eye photographs are divided into narrow juxtaposed strips and viewed through a superimposed ruled or lenticular screen in such a way that each of the observer's eyes is able to see only the correct picture. It is also used to obtain the illusion of depth of one or more objects placed on the horizon and reflected on a flat surface.
