= Pio Siotto =

Italian artist

Pio Siotto (Rome, 3 May 1824 - ?) was an Italian artist active as a cameo engraver (gem engraver).

He studied architecture, figure, ornate and modeling in clay at the Academy of St. Luke in Rome, and his teacher in modeling was Pietro Tenerani. He initially apprenticed with Bartolomeo Rinaldi: but soon set up his own studio. He was prolific. Pio engraved portraits or scenes, in profile and perspective, large and small, on medallions, pins, rings, bracelets bearing engraved stones from him. His onyx (soft) cameos were engraved steel tip, while his cameos on shells and semi-precious hard stones (pietre dure), were engraved with a diamond-dust lathe.

For a noble Polish noblewoman, he engraved a series of medallions representing the Kings of Poland. This collection, in shell cameos, was begun in 1860, and completed in 1870. He completed a medallion depicting the Lacoon of the Vatican Palace. He has also made copies of sculpture of Thorvaldsen, Gibson, Canova, and Fedi. Pio engraved Fedi's Rape of Polyxena, displayed under the Loggia dei Lanzi, in a cameo, which was stolen at the Centennial Exposition of Philadelphia. He made a triptych of sardonyx cameos to celebrate the family of the Queen Margherita of Savoy: the first depicts the monument raised in Turin for the Prince Ferdinand, Duke of Genoa (Queen's father), the other an equestrian statue of King Victor Emmanuel II of Italy, father of the then present king; and the third medal was the portrait of the then Prince of Naples, later King Victor Emmanuel III of Italy. Siotto was awarded at the Expositions of Rome, Naples, Vienna, Philadelphia, and Melbourne. At Melbourne, he exhibited in a glass exhibition case, the process of cameo engraving from the natural shell to completed carving.
