= 1824 St. Petersburg flood =

St. Petersburg Flood in 1824

1824 St. Petersburg Flood
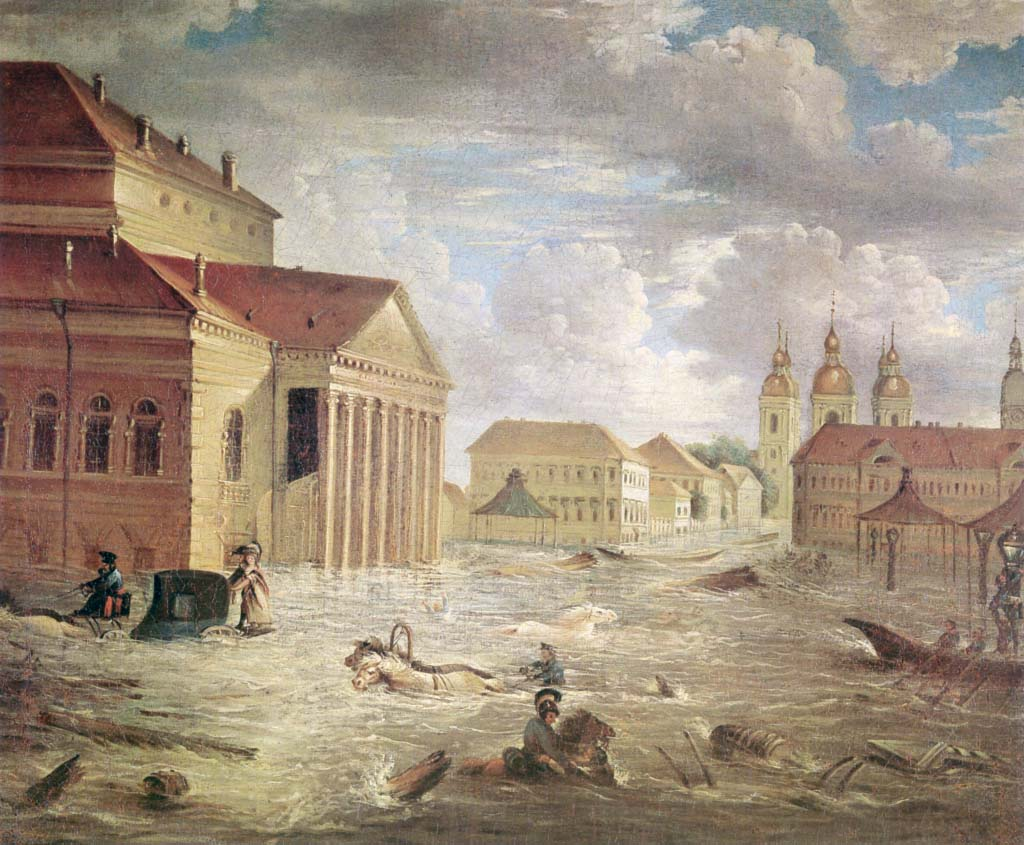
- In front of Bolshoi Theatre.
- Date: November 7, 1824
- Location: St. Petersburg, Russia
- Deaths: 200-600

The 1824 St. Petersburg Flood occurred in 1824, killing several hundred people. It was the deadliest flood in the history of Russia and St. Petersburg. The water level peaked at 421 centimetres at 2 p.m., the highest recorded floodwaters in Russian history.

At 10 a.m., the flooding began, but by 2 p.m., the river Neva was already returning to normal levels. Due to the flood, sanitary conditions were worsened, resulting in one of the causes of the first cholera epidemic of 1831
