= Eva Bacharach =

Czech rabbinical scholar

Eva Bacharach (also known as Ḥavvah or Chawa Eva Cohen; 1580, Prague – 1651 or 1652, Sofia) was a notable Czech rabbinical scholar and Hebraist, particularly recognized for her learning and commentaries on Jewish texts.

== Early life and family ==
Born in Prague in 1580, Eva Bacharach came from an illustrious and scholarly family. She was the maternal granddaughter of the famous Rabbi Judah Loew ben Bezalel, known as the Maharal of Prague, a prominent rabbi of his day. Her father was Rabbi Isaac ha-Kohen (Katz), also a learned rabbi who died in Prague in 1624. Her mother was Vögele Kohen, who died in 1629. Eva had two brothers, Ḥayyim and Naphtali, who were respected rabbis in Poland.

== Marriage and widowhood ==
In 1600, Eva married Rabbi Abraham Samuel Bacharach, who was a student of both her grandfather, the Maharal, and her father. Abraham Samuel Bacharach was born in 1575 and became the Rabbi of Worms.

A terrible misfortune struck the Jewish community of Worms in 1615, when a persecution broke out. On Good Friday, April 7, 1615, the synagogue roof was torn off, the cemetery was laid to waste, and tombstones were broken. Rabbi Samuel fled to Gernsheim on the Rhine. Although the riot was suppressed by the Electoral Prince Palatine of Heidelberg by April 24, 1615, Rabbi Samuel died upon foreign soil in his fortieth year and was buried on May 26, 1615, in Alsbach.

Eva Bacharach was left a widow at the age of 30 and returned to her parents and relatives in Prague with her son Moses Samson Bacharach (born in 1607) and her three daughters, in order to devote herself to the education of her children. She spent most of the rest of her life in Prague. Eva never remarried, despite having opportunities to do so, including a proposal from Isaiah Horowitz, then rabbi of Prague, who was about to emigrate to Jerusalem, although she longed to be in the Holy Land.

When her three daughters were married, she followed her son Samson to Worms, whither he had been called to take the position of his father; and soon afterward, in 1651, she left for Palestine. On the journey, Eva Bacharach died in Sofia, where she was buried with great honor. Her grandson, Yair Bacharach, called his work in memory of her Havvot Yair, which, in the usual German pronunciation, might be understood as "Eva's Yair".

== Scholarship ==
As a daughter of such a distinguished rabbinical family, she acquired a wide knowledge of Hebrew and rabbinical literature, and could often assist rabbis in solving textual difficulties. Such erudition was quite uncommon among Jewish women of that time, and the Memorbuch of Worms makes special mention of it.
