= Yair Bacharach =

17th century posek

Yair Chayim Bacharach
- יאיר חיים בכרך
- Born: 1638; Lipník nad Bečvou, Moravia
- Died: January 1, 1702; Worms, Holy Roman Empire
- Resting place: Jewish Cemetery, Worms
- Occupations: Rabbi, Posek, Book collector
- Years active: 1666–1702
- Era: Koblenz, Worms, Frankfurt
- Known for: rabbi, posek
- Father: Moses Samson Bacharach
- Relatives: Maharal of Prague (great-great-grandfather) Eva Bacharach (grandmother) Abraham Samuel Bacharach (grandfather) Tobias Cohn (step-brother)

Rabbi Yair Chayim Bacharach (1638, Lipník nad Bečvou, Moravia — 1702; Hebrew: יאיר חיים בכרך, also known by his work Chavos Yair or Chavot Yair) was a German rabbi and major 17th century posek, who lived first in Koblenz and then the remainder of his life in Worms and Mainz. His grandmother Eva Bacharach was a granddaughter of the Maharal of Prague, and his father Moses Samson Bacharach, and grandfather had served as rabbis of Worms.

== Life ==
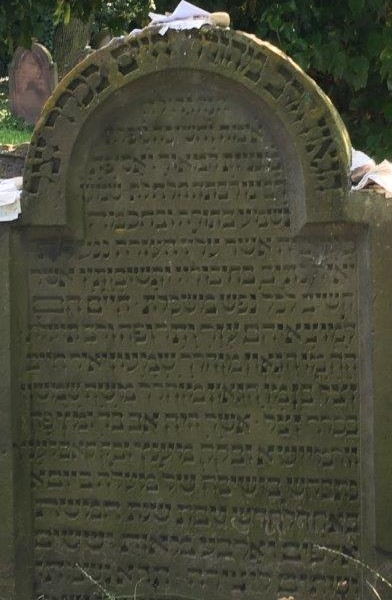
The tombstone of Rabbi Yair Chayim Bacharach in the Jewish Cemetery of Worms

He was born in Lipnik in 1638; according to another claim, he was born in Mahersbrod in 1628. His birth name was Hayim; the name Yair was added after an illness. At age 12 he moved to Worms along with his father, who was appointed rabbi of the city. After the second marriage of his father to Phega, Bacharach become step brother of the famous Jewish physician Tobias Cohn. At 22 he was ordained as a rabbi, and served for some time as rabbi of Mainz. In 1666 he was chosen as rabbi of nearby Koblenz, but in 1669 he returned to Worms. His father died in 1670 and although he left a will for the community to elect his son to replace him as chief rabbi they decided not to choose Bacharach but chose Aaron Teomim, a preacher from Prague.

In 1689 the Worms community was decimated by the French during the Nine Years' War, and Bacharach was forced to leave the city for a period of 10 years. Gradually, it was rebuilt. In 1699 he was appointed rabbi of Worms, where his father and grandfather had served before him. He served for only three years until his death in 1702. The inscription on his tombstone begins with the words: “A great and dark horror befalls us from the hiding of the light of Rabbeinu...”

== Works ==
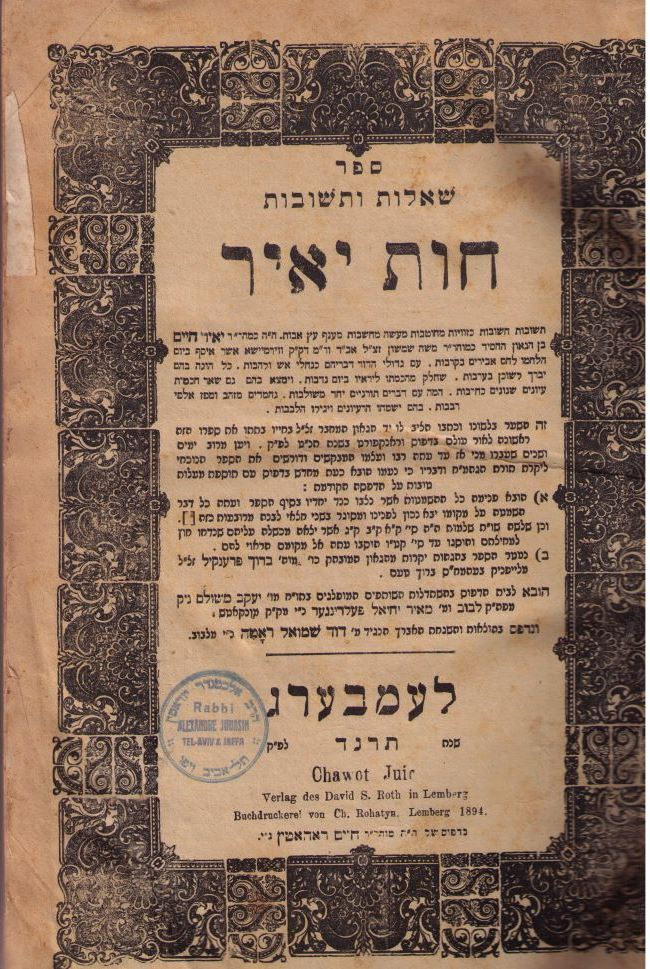
Chavos Yair, Lemberg, 1894

Bacharach was the author of Chavos Yair ("Villages of Yair") a collection of responsa by the title of which is he commonly referred (first published in Frankfurt am Main, 1699); its title is a reference to his grandmother Chava as well as to a place mentioned in Numbers 32:41 and elsewhere in the Jewish Bible. Other work includes his Mekor Chayim, which was intended as a principal commentary to Shulkhan Arukh but was withdrawn by Bacharach when he discovered that other commentaries, notably the Taz and the Magen Avraham, had appeared. It is still regarded as a prime source of material concerning minhagim (customs) of the area and epoch. Bacharach also wrote a work criticizing Rabbi Aharon Teomim-Frankels' Mateh Aharon. Therein, Bacharach sharply criticizes the pilpulic methodology common among the rabbis of his time.

Besides his Halakhic expertise he had complete mastery of all the sciences, music, history and wrote poetry. He compiled a 46 volume encyclopedia on many topics called Yair Nesiv, which remains unpublished.

In 1982 his major work, Mekor Chaim, was finally published posthumously by Machon Yerushalayim, and was reprinted in 2018.

In 1993, Machon Yerushalayim published the book Mar Kashisha from the manuscript of Bacharach. This work contains a collection of the principles and expressions found in the Talmud and Aggadah.

== Views ==
Bacharach's view of Kabbalah was nuanced. While he believed Kabbalah to be very holy, he maintained that it posed great theological danger, and should therefore only be studied by the extremely pious, and only with a teacher. In his responsa, Bacharach relates that a commoner asked him to explain the Kabbalistic formulas commonly printed in prayer books. Bacharach refused to answer, and when he was pressed, said only that he didn't know the explanation. Although he discouraged in-depth study of Kabbalah, he encouraged simple reading of the Zohar, and many of his writings contain Kabbalistic references, especially to explain communal customs.
