= Judah Bachrach =

Rabbi and Talmudist

Personal life
- Born: c. 1775 Lithuania
- Died: 25 April 1846 Sejny, Suwałki Governorate, Congress Poland

Religious life
- Religion: Judaism

Judah ben Joshua Heskiel Bachrach (Hebrew: יהודה בכרך; c. 1775 – 25 April 1846), also known as the Grib (הגרי״ב, an acronym of Ha-Gaon Rav Yehuda Bachrach), was a rabbi and Talmudist. He served as av bet din of Sejny, Suwałki Governorate.

== Biography ==
Judah Bachrach was born in Lithuania around 1775. He was a seventh-generation descendant of Tobias Bachrach, who, along with Israel ben Shalom, was executed on charges of ritual murder in Ruzhany on 19 September 1659.

Bachrach was known for his piety, and donated all his income from his rabbinical position in Sejny to the poor, living on the interest from a small fund that his friends had invested for him in their business. His Talmudic notes were published under the title Nimmuḳe ha-Grib by the Romm publishing house in Vilna.
