= Abraham Samuel Bacharach =

Rabbi (c. 1575–1615

Abraham Samuel Bacharach was a Rabbi, born about 1575; died in Gernsheim, Electorate of Mainz, May 26, 1615. He seems to have come from the city of Worms, but is first met with at Prague, where, in 1600, he married Eva, the granddaughter of the chief rabbi of Prague, Judah Loew ben Bezalel. He was rabbi in Turbin, Kolín (Bohemia), and in Pohrlitz (Moravia); and was subsequently called to the ministry of the very important congregation of Worms. One of the frequent riots against the Jews, instigated by the guilds, caused him to flee from the city. He died during exile, and was buried in Alsbach. Bacharach was respected for his learning and piety. He took a firm stand against the rabbis of Frankfurt, who arrogated to themselves preeminence over all the other rabbis of Germany. A few of his responsa were published by his grandson, Jair Ḥayyim, in the collected "Ḥut ha-Shani" (Frankfurt-am-Main, 1679). Bacharach was the author of an essay on the Jewish calendar, a number of apologetic works against Christianity, liturgical poems, and casuistic treatises. Some of his works are still extant in manuscript.
