= Ike (given name) =

Ike is a mostly masculine given name and nickname. It is often short for Isaac. Notable people with the name include:

== People ==
=== A ===
- Ike Altgens (1919–1995), American photojournalist who captured JFK assassination
- Ike Amadi (born 1979), Nigerian voice actor
- Ike Anderson (born 1957), American Greco-Roman wrestler
- Ike Franklin Andrews (1925–2010), American politician from North Carolina
- Ike Anigbogu (born 1998), American basketball player
- Ike Armstrong (1895–1983), American football player, coach and college athletics administrator
- Ike Aronowicz (1923–2009), Israeli sailor and captain of the immigrant ship SS Exodus
- Ike Atkinson (1925–2014), American drug trafficker
- Ike Azotam (born 1991), Nigerian-American basketball player

=== B ===
- Ike Barinholtz (born 1977), American actor and comedian
- Ike Bartle (1880–1949), England international rugby league footballer
- Ike Bassindale (1896–1985), English footballer
- Ike Bayles (1876–1956), Latvian-American businessman
- Ike Benners (1856–1932), American baseball player
- Ike Bikitsha (1935–2015), South African politician
- Ike Bird (1895–1984), English footballer
- Ike Blessitt (born 1949), American baseball player
- Ike Bloom (1865–1930), American businessman, cabaret and nightclub owner
- Ike Boettger (born 1994), American football player
- Ike Boland (born c. 1908), American football player
- Ike Boone (1897–1958), American baseball player
- Ike Borsavage (1924–2014), American basketball player
- Ike Brookens (born 1949), American baseball player
- Ike Brookes (1861–1935), English footballer
- Ike Brown (1942–2001), American baseball player
- Ike Brown (Canadian football) (born 1951), Canadian football player
- Ike Butler (1873–1948), American baseball player

=== C ===
- Ike Caveney (1894–1949), American baseball player
- Ike Charlton (born 1977), American gridiron football player and coach
- Ike Chioke, Nigerian investment banker, philanthropist
- Ike Clanton (1847–1887), Rancher and member of the Cochise County Cowboys, Arizona Territory
- Ike Clarke (1915–2002), English footballer and manager
- Ike Cole (1927–2001), American jazz pianist and composer

=== D ===
- Ike Danning (1905-1983), American baseball player
- Ike Davis (born 1987), American baseball player
- Ike Davis (shortstop) (1895–1984), American baseball player
- Ike Day (1925–1958), American jazz musician
- Ike Delock (1929–2022), American baseball player
- Ike Diogu (born 1983), Nigerian-American basketball player
- Ike Dixon (1896–1953), American music venue proprietor
- Ike Dorgan (1879–1960), American boxing manager and publisher
- Ike Duffey (1906–1967), American businessman & sports executive

=== E ===
- Ike Eichrodt (1903–1965), American baseball player
- Ike Eisenmann (born 1962), American actor
- Ike Ekweremadu (born 1962), Nigerian politician and lawyer

=== F ===
- Ike Forte (born 1954), American football player
- Ike Fowler (1894–1981), Wales dual-code international rugby footballer & RL match official
- Ike Frankian (1905–1963), American football player and coach

=== H ===
- Ike Hampton (born 1951), American baseball player
- Ike Harris (born 1952), American football player
- Ike Hatch (1892–1961), American jazz musician
- Ike Hildebrand (1927–2006), Canadian ice hockey and lacrosse player
- Ike Hill (born 1947), American football player
- Ike Hilliard (born 1976), American football player and coach
- Ike Holter (born 1985), American playwright
- Ike Hoover (1871–1933), American cabinet administrator

=== I ===
- Ike Ibeabuchi (born 1973), Nigerian boxer
- Ike Ibenegbu (born 1986), Nigerian footballer
- Ike Ilsley (born 1940), Australian rules footballer
- Ike Irby, American political advisor
- Ike Irish (born 2003), American baseball player
- Ike Iroegbu (born 1995), American-Nigerian basketball player
- Ike Isaacs (guitarist) (1919–1996), Burmese-English jazz guitarist
- Ike Isaacs (bassist) (1923–1981), American jazz musician

=== J ===
- Ike Jones (1929–2014), American film producer and actor
- Ike Joselove (1904–1925), American football player

=== K ===
- Ike Kahdot (1899–1999), American baseball player
- Ike Kamp (1900–1955), American baseball player
- Ike Kaveladze (born 1965), Georgian-American business executive
- Ike Kelley (born 1944), American football player
- Ike Klingbeil (1908–1995), American ice hockey player
- Ike Knox (1887–1969), American football player

=== L ===
- Ike Landvoigt (born 1973), German rower
- Ike Larsen (born 2003), American football player
- Ike Lassiter (1940–2015), American football player
- Ike Leggett (born 1944), American politician
- Ike Little (1888–1945), Australian rules footballer
- Ike Lozada (1943–1995), Filipino comedian, actor and TV host

=== M ===
- Ike MacKay (born 1948), Canadian former soccer forward
- Ike Mahoney (1901–1961), American football player
- Ike Maphotho (1931–2019), South African anti-apartheid activist
- Ike Marsh (1877–1949), English footballer
- Ike Martin (1887–1979), American football player and sports coach
- Ike McAuley (1891–1928), American baseball player
- Ike McFadden (born 1977), American film producer
- Ike McGorian (born 1901), English footballer
- Ike Morgan (1871–1913), American newspaper illustrator
- Ike Moriz (born 1972), German-South African musician and actor
- Ike Motloung, South African lawyer

=== N ===
- Ike Nassi (born 1949), American computer scientist
- Ike Nnaebue (born 1975), Nigerian film director and producer
- Ike Nwachukwu (born 1940), Nigerian politician and general
- Ike Nwala (born 1986), American comedian, actor and narrator
- Ike Nwamu (born 1993), Nigerian-American basketball player
- Ike Nwankwo (born 1973), Nigerian-American basketball player
- Ike Nwosu (born 1946), Nigerian politician

=== O ===
- Ike Odimegwu, Nigerian philosopher
- Ike Ofoegbu (born 1984), American-Nigerian basketball player
- Ike Oguine (born 1900), Nigerian writer and lawyer
- Ike Okoli (born 1988), American amateur wrestler
- Ike Opara (born 1989), American soccer player
- Ike Orazi (born 2007), Irish association footballer
- Ike Orji (born 2003), English footballer
- Ike Owens (1918–1998), GB & Wales international rugby league & union footballer
- Ike Owens (American football) (1920–1980), American football player

=== P ===
- Ike Pappas (1933–2008), American journalist
- Ike Pearson (1917–1985), American baseball player
- Ike Petersen (1909–1995), American football player
- Ike Ponce (born 1959), Filipino politician
- Ike Poole (1915–2002), American basketball player
- Ike Powers (1906–1968), American baseball player
- Ike T. Pryor (1852–1937), American cattle rancher and businessman

=== Q ===
- Ike Quartey (born 1969), Ghanaian boxer
- Ike Quebec (1918–1963), American jazz saxophonist

=== R ===
- Ike Readon (born 1963), American football player
- Ike Reese (born 1973), American football player and sports radio host
- Ike Reilly (born 1963), American musician
- Ike Richman (1913–1965), American lawyer and sports executive
- Ike Robin (1886–1968), New Zealand wrestler
- Ike Robinson (1915–1979), English footballer
- Ike Rockenfield (1876–1927), American baseball player
- Ike Rogers, American football player
- Ike Rose (1865–1935), German-American showman

=== S ===
- Ike Samuels (1874–1964), American baseball player
- Ike Schab (1920–2025), American World War II veteran and Pearl Harbor survivor
- Ike Sellers (1905–1997), Australian rules footballer
- Ike Sewell (1903–1990), American businessman
- Ike Shorunmu (born 1967), Nigerian footballer
- Hugh Ike Shott (1866–1953), Newspaper editor, rapper, broadcaster and politician in West Virginia
- Ike Skelton (1931–2013), American politician
- Ike Smith (born 1997), American basketball player
- Ike Southward (1934–2006), GB international rugby league footballer and coach
- Ike Stubblefield (1952–2021), American musician
- Ike Sturm (born 1978), American bassist, composer, and bandleader
- Richard Ike Sutton (1915–2001), American politician

=== T ===
- Ike Tate (1906–1986), English footballer
- Ike Taylor (born 1980), American football player
- Ike Thomas (born 1947), American football player
- Ike Thomas (baseball) (fl. 1930s), American baseball player
- Ike Thompson (1915–1995), American politician
- Ike Tomlinson (1910–2000), American athletics coach and college administrator
- Ike Turner (1931–2007), American musician

=== U ===
- Ike Udanoh (born 1989), American-Nigerian basketball player
- Ike Udeh (born 1973), Nigerian footballer
- Ike Uzoma (born 1978), Nigerian footballer

=== V ===
- Ike Vern (1916–1987), American freelance magazine photographer and documentary filmmaker
- Ike Villanueva (born 1984), American mixed martial arts fighter

=== W ===
- Ike Wales (1865–1949), Australian cricketer
- Ike Webb (1874–1950), English footballer
- Ike Weir (1867–1908), Irish featherweight boxer
- Ike Whelpton, English footballer
- Ike White (1945–2018), American singer-songwriter, composer and musician
- Ike Whittaker (born 1935), Australian rules footballer
- Ike Williams (1923–1994), American boxer
- Ike Williams (American football) (1903–1977), American football player
- Ike Willis (1955–2026), American vocalist and guitarist
- Ike Woods (1879–1962), Australian rules footballer

=== Z ===
- Ike Van Zandt (1876–1908), American baseball player
- Ike Zimmerman (1907–1967), American blues guitarist

== Fictional characters ==
- Ike (Fire Emblem), the main character in the multiple video games
- Ike Broflovski, Kyle Broflovski's little brother from South Park

== See also ==
- Ike (disambiguation)
- Ike (surname)
