= Isaac (name) =

- Pronunciation: /ˈaɪzək/ EYE-zək
- Gender: Male

Origin
- Language: Hebrew
- Meaning: "(he) will laugh"

Other names
- Variant forms: Isak, Isaak, Iisakki, Eshaac, Isac, Ishak, Ishaaq, Issac, Ishaak, Itshak, Itzhak, Yishak, Yishaq, Yitzhak, Isack
- Nicknames: Izzy, Ike, Itzik, Ziggy, Zig
- Related names: Ike, Zak (given name), Zak (surname)

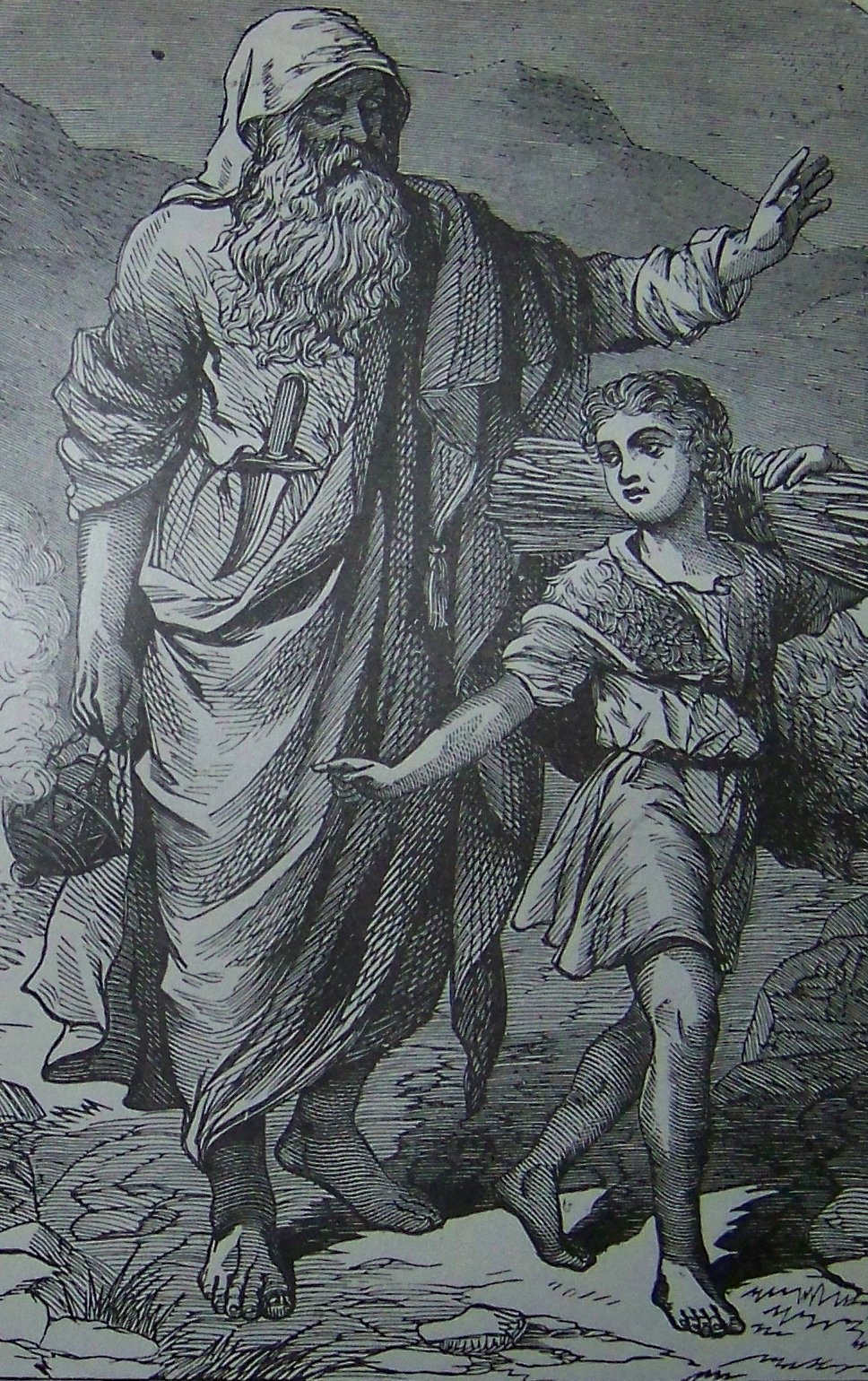
Abraham going up to offer Isaac as a sacrifice, as in Genesis 22, illustration from the 1890 Holman Bible

Isaac (/ˈaɪzək/ EYE-zək) transliterated from Yitzhak, Yitzchok (Hebrew: יִצְחָק, Modern: Yīṣḥaq, Tiberian: Yīṣḥāq) is a given name derived from Judaism and a given name among Jewish, Christian, and Muslim societies, generally in reference to the above. "Ike" and "Ise" are also short forms of the name. Isaac was one of the three patriarchs in the Hebrew Bible, whose story is told in the book of Genesis.

== Forms of the name in different languages ==
- Albanian: Isak
- Arabic: إسحٰق, إسحاق (Ishaq, ʼIsḥāq)
- Armenian: Սահակ (Sahak or Sahag)
- Azerbaijani: İshaq / Исһаг / ایسهاق, İsaak / Исаак / ایسااک
- Basque: Isaak
- Belarusian: Ісак (Isak)
- Bengali: ইসহাক (Ishak)
- Bosnian: Ishak,Isak
- Breton: Izaag
- Bulgarian: Исаак (Isaak)
- Catalan: Isaac
- Chinese: 艾萨克 / 艾薩克 (Àisàkè), 以撒 (Yǐsǎ; Ji5saat3)
- Croatian: Izak
- Czech: Izák
- Danish: Isak, (older:) Isach
- Dutch: Isaak
- English: Isaac, Ike, Isac (Old English)
- Esperanto: Isaako, Izaak, Isĥak, Ike, Isac
- Estonian: Iisak
- Ewe: Isak
- Faroese: Ísakur
- Finnish: Iisak, Iisakki, Iikka, Iiro, Isko
- French: Isaac
- Galician: Isaac
- Georgian: ისააკ (Isaak)
- German: Isaak
- Greek: Ισαάκιος (Isaakios), Ισαάκ (Isaák)
- Haitian Creole: Izarak
- Hausa: Is'haƙu, Isaka
- Hebrew: יִצְחָק, (Yiṣḥāq, IPA /jits'xak/), Yitzhak, Itzhak, Yitshak, Itshak
- Hindi: इसहाक (Isahaak)
- Hmong: Ixaj
- Hungarian: Izsák
- Icelandic: Ísak
- Indonesian: Ishak, Isaac
- Irish: Íosác
- Italian: Isacco
- Japanese: アイザック (Aizakku), イサク (Isaku)
- Javanese: Iskak
- Kannada: ಐಸಾಕ್ (Aisāk)
- Kazak: Ысқақ (Isqaq), Ысақ (Isaq)
- Khmer: អ៊ីសាក (Aisak)
- Korean: 이삭 (I-sak), 아이작 (Aijak)
- Kyrgyz: Ыскаак (Isqaaq), Исхак (İshaq)
- Lao: ອີຊາກ (Isak)
- Ladino: יצחק (Yiṣḥāq), Ike, Itshak, Izak, Yshac, Yshak, Ishac, Isak, Yitzhak, Yitshak (Yitsḥak), Yitzjak, Isacc
- Latin: Isaac
- Latvian: Aizeks, Izaks
- Lithuanian: Izaokas
- Macedonian: Исак (Isak)
- Malay: Ishak, Sahak
- Malayalam: ഇസഹാക് (Isahaak)
- Māori: Ihaka
- Mongolian: Исаак (Isaak)
- Norwegian: Isak
- Persian: اسحاق (Eshaq)
- Polish: Izaak
- Portuguese: Isaque,
- Russian: Исаак (Isaak), Айзек(Ayzek)
- Romanian: Isac, Ițac
- Scottish Gaelic: Iosag
- Serbian Cyrillic: Исак (Isak)
- Slovene: Izak
- Somali: Isxaaq
- Spanish: Isaac
- Swahili: Isaka, Isaki
- Swedish: Isak, Isac
- Syriac: ܐܝܤܚܩ (Iskhaaq)
- Tamil: ஈசாக்கு (eesaaku)
- Telugu: ఇస్సాకు, (Issāku)
- Thai: อิสอัค, ไอแซก (Xịsæk)
- Turkish: İshak, İshâk
- Ukrainian: Ісаак (Isaak)
- Uyghur: ئىسھاق (Ishaq), ئىساق (Isaq)
- Uzbek: Ishoq (Is-hoq)
- Urdu: اسحاق
- Yiddish: יצחק (Yẕẖq) (= Yitskhok, IPA /'jitsxok/), Aizik, Isaak, Izik, Yitzhak, Isac, Itzak, Itzek, Itzig, Hiztig, Izaak, Zack, Zak
- Yoruba: Ísáàkì
- Zulu: Isaka

== Given name ==
=== Isaac ===
- Saint Isaac (disambiguation), several people
- Isaac Abarbanel (1437–1508), Portuguese Jewish statesman and philosopher
- Isaac Acker (1821–1906), American politician from Pennsylvania
- Isaac Aguiar Tomich (born 2004), Brazilian footballer
- Isaac Alarcón (born 1998), Mexican American football player
- Isaac Albéniz (1860–1909), Spanish pianist and composer
- Isaac Alfasi (1013–1103), Algerian Talmudist and jurist
- Isaac II Angelos (1156–1204), Byzantine emperor
- Isaac of Armenia (354–439), Patriarch of the Armenian Apostolic Church
- Isaac Asiata (born 1992), American football player
- Isaac Asimov (1920–1992), Russian-born American writer and biochemist
- Isaac Babel (1894–1940), Russian journalist, playwright and short story writer
- Isaac Barrow (1630–1677), English theologian and mathematician
- Isaac Beeckman (1588–1637), Dutch philosopher and scientist
- Isaac de Benserade (1613–1691), French poet
- Isaac Dov Berkowitz (1885–1967), Israeli author and translator
- Isaac the Blind (c.1160–1235), French Jewish mysticist and Kabbalist
- Isaac N. Blodgett (1838–1905), associate justice and chief justice of the New Hampshire Supreme Court
- Isaac Boleslavsky (1919–1977), Soviet chess grandmaster
- Isaac Bonga (born 1999), German basketball player
- Isaac Erb Bowman (1832–1897), Canadian politician and businessman
- Isaac Brock (1769–1812), British Army officer and colonial administrator
- Isaac Brock (musician) (born 1975), American lead singer in Modest Mouse
- Isaac Casaubon (1559–1614), French-born English classical scholar and philologist
- Isaac of the Cells, Egyptian Christian monk who lived during the 6th and 7th centuries
- Isaac Watts Choate (1882–1953), associate justice of the Montana Supreme Court
- Isaac da Costa (1798–1860), Dutch Jewish poet
- Isaac Cuenca (born 1991), Spanish footballer
- Isaac Dalby (1744–1824), English mathematician and surveyor
- Isaac Darkangelo (born 2000), American football player
- Isaac D'Israeli (1766–1848), British writer, scholar and man of letters
- Isaac Deutscher (1907–1967), Polish writer, journalist and political activist
- Isaac Dickson (1840–1919), American civic leader
- Isaac ben Eliezer, 15th-century German rabbi
- Isaac El Matari, jailed Australian ISIS leader from New South Wales.
- Isaac of Firuz Shabur, rabbi of the Geonic period
- Isaac Guerendo (born 2000), American football player
- Isaac Hanson (born 1980), American musician, guitarist in Hanson
- Isaac Hayes (1942–2008), American singer-songwriter, voice actor, and producer
- Isaac Israel Hayes (1832–1881), American Arctic explorer, physician and politician
- Isaac Hamilton (born 1994), American basketball player
- Isaac Heeney (born 1996), Australian rules footballer
- Isaac Heller (1926–2015), American toy manufacturer, co-founder of Remco
- Isaac Hempstead Wright (born 1999), English actor
- Isaac Herzog (born 1960), 11th President of Israel
- Isaac le Heup (c.1686–1747), British diplomat and politician
- Isaac Holloway (1805–1885), American politician from Ohio
- Isaac Isaacs (1855–1948), Australian Chief Justice and Governor-General
- Isaac Israeli ben Solomon (c. 832 – c. 932), Arab Jewish physician and philosopher
- Isaac Israëls (1865–1934), Dutch impressionist painter
- Isaac bar Judah, 4th-century Babylonian rabbi
- Isaac ben Judah, 12th-century rabbi
- Isaac ben Judah HaLevi, 13th-century French rabbi
- Isaac Kashdan (1905–1985), American chess grandmaster
- Isaac I Komnenos (c. 1007–1061), Byzantine emperor
- Isaac Komnenos (son of Alexios I) (1093 – aft. 1152), Byzantine prince
- Isaac Komnenos of Cyprus (c.1155–1196), ruler of Cyprus
- Isaac Kragten (born 2002), Canadian actor
- Isaac "Ike" Larsen (born 2003), American football player
- Isaac Lea (1792–1886), American publisher, conchologist and geologist
- Isaac Levitan (1860–1900), Russian landscape painter
- Isaac Luria (1534–1572), Jewish religious leader and mysticist
- Isaac Makwala (born 1986), Botswana sprinter
- Isaac McKneely (born 2003), American basketball player
- Isaac Musa (died 2008), Liberian military officer and politician
- Isaac Nappaha, Galilean rabbi of the 3rd-4th centuries
- Isaac Nauta (born 1997), American football player
- Isaac Newton (1642–1727), English mathematician, astronomer, and physicist
- Isaac R. Nicholson (1789/1790–1844), associate justice of the Supreme Court of Mississippi
- Isaac of Nineveh (c. 613 – c. 700), Syriac Christian bishop and theologian
- Isaac Okoro (born 2001), American basketball player
- Isaac Okoronkwo (born 1978), Nigerian footballer
- Isaac Oliver (c.1565–1617), French-born English portrait painter
- Isaac van Ostade (1621–1649), Dutch genre and landscape painter
- Isaac Peral (1851–1895), Spanish engineer, naval officer and designer of the Peral Submarine
- Isaac Leib Peretz (1852–1915), Yiddish writer from Poland
- Isaac Pitman (1813–1897), English inventor of shorthand/stenography
- Isaac Rex, American football player
- Isaac Roberts (1829–1904), Welsh amateur astronomer
- Isaac Rodrigues de Lima (born 2004), Brazilian footballer
- Isaac Rochell (born 1995), American football player
- Isaac Rosefelt (born 1985), American-Israeli basketball player
- Isaac Schmidt (born 1999), Swiss footballer
- Isaac Henrique Sequeira (1738–1816), Portuguese physician
- Isaac Shelby (1750–1826), Governor of Kentucky
- Isaac Singer (1811–1875), American inventor and businessman (sewing machine)
- Isaac Bashevis Singer (1902–1991), Polish-born American author, Nobel prize literature 1978
- Isaac Slade (born 1981), American lead singer in The Fray
- Isaac Stern (1920–2001), Ukrainian-born American violinist and conductor
- Isaac Taylor (1787–1865), English philosopher & historian
- Isaac Taylor (priest) (1829–1901), Anglican priest, philologist, toponymist
- Isaac TeSlaa (born 2002), American football player
- Isaac Titsingh (1745–1812), Dutch surgeon, scholar, merchant-trader and ambassador
- Isaac Inoke Tosika, Solomon Islands politician
- Isaac Ukwu (born 1999), American football player
- Isaac Vorsah (born 1988), Ghanaian footballer
- Isaac Watts (1674–1748), English Christian minister, hymn writer, theologian, and logician
- Isaac Wayne (1772–1856), U.S. Congressman
- Isaac Wayne (1699–1774), Pennsylvania Provincial Assembly member, Captain of Pennsylvania Provincial Forces during the French and Indian War
- Isaac White (basketball) (born 1998), Australian basketball player
- Isaac Witz (1934–2026), Austrian-born Israeli immunologist, cancer researcher and academic
- Isaac Woodard (1919–1992), American soldier and violence victim
- Isaac Yiadom (born 1996), American football player

==== Fictional characters ====
- Isaac Bean, a Season 4 contestant in Fetch! with Ruff Ruffman
- Isaac Clarke, the main protagonist from the Dead Space video game series
- Isaac Dian in the light novel and anime series Baccano!
- Isaac Henderson in the 1999 film) The Mummy
- Isaac Kleiner in the video games Half-Life and Half-Life 2
- Isaac Lahey, in MTV's TV series Teen Wolf
- Isaac Mendez in the television series Heroes
- Isaac Netero in the manga series Hunter × Hunter

=== Isaach ===
- Isaach de Bankolé (born 1957), Ivorian actor

=== Isaak ===
- Isaak Abelin (1883–1965), Swiss physiologist
- Isaak Asknaziy (1856–1902), Russian painter
- Isaak Bacharach (1854–1942), German mathematician
- Isaak Benrubi (1876–1943), Ottoman philosopher
- Isaak van den Blocke (1574–1626), Flemish painter in Poland
- Isaak Brodsky (1884–1939), Soviet painter
- Isaak Bubis (1910–2000), Moldavian Soviet engineer and architect
- Isaak August Dorner (1809–1884), German church leader
- Isaak Dunayevsky (1900–1955), Soviet composer
- Isaak Elias (1912–1998), Canadian politician
- Isaak Löw Hofmann, Edler von Hofmannsthal (1759–1849), Austrian merchant
- Isaak de Graaf (1668–1743), Dutch cartographer
- Isaak Guderian (born 1996), German singer
- Isaak Iselin (1728–1782), Swiss philosopher of history and politics
- Isaak Markus Jost (1793–1860), German Jewish historian
- Isaak Kikoin (1908–1984), Soviet physicist
- Isaak Markovich Khalatnikov (1919–2021), Soviet physicist
- Isaak B. Klejman (1921–2012), Ukrainian Soviet archaeologist
- Isaak Lalayants (1870–1933), Russian revolutionary
- Isaak Ah Mau (born 1982), New Zealand rugby league player
- Isaak D. Mayergoyz, American academic
- Isaak Mazepa (1884–1952), Ukrainian politician
- Isaak Moiseevich Milin (1919–1992), Soviet mathematician
- Isaak "Tjaak" Pattiwael (1914–1987), Indonesian footballer
- Isaak Pomeranchuk (1913–1966), Soviet physicist
- Isaak Illich Rubin (1886–1937), Soviet economist
- Isaak Augustijn Rumpf (1673–1723), Dutch Governor of Ceylon
- Isaak Tirion (1705–1765), Dutch publisher
- Isaak Voss (1618–1689), Dutch scholar and manuscript collector
- Isaak Yaglom (1921–1988), Soviet mathematician
- Isaak Zelensky (1890–1938), Soviet politician

==== Fictional characters ====
- Isaak (Tekken), Character first introduced in Tekken Mobile

== Surname Isaac or Isaak ==
- Adèle Isaac (1854–1915), French operatic soprano
- Adisa Isaac (born 2001), American football player
- Alexandre Isaac (1845–1899), French lawyer, Senator of Guadeloupe 1885–1889
- Arthur Isaac (cricketer), English cricketer
- Auguste Isaac (1849–1938), French politician
- Bryan Isaac, British ballroom dancer
- Bobby Isaac, American racing driver
- Chris Isaak, American musician
- George Isaac (politician), Egyptian politician
- Glynn Isaac, South African archaeologist
- Heinrich Isaac (Ugonis, Henricus, Heinrich, Arrigo or Ysaac; c.1450–1517), Franco-Flemish composer
- John Isaac (cricketer), English cricketer
- Jonathan Isaac, American basketball player
- Luis Isaac, Puerto Rican baseball player
- Oscar Isaac, American actor
- Ray Isaac (quarterback), American football player
- Ray Isaac (singer), Australian singer
- Rhys Isaac, American historian
- Robert M. Isaac, American politician
- Ty Isaac, American football player
- Ashley MacIsaac, Canadian violinist

== See also ==
- Isaac (disambiguation)
- Isaacs (surname)
- Isaacson
- Ike (given name)
- Ishak (name)
- Izak
