= Yitzhak =

- Pronunciation: Modern Hebrew: [jit͡sˈχak] Classical Hebrew: [jisˤˈħaːq]
- Gender: Male
- Language: Hebrew

Origin
- Meaning: 'laughing'
- Region of origin: Ancient Israel

Other names
- Alternative spelling: Itzhak, Yitzhaq, Yitshak, Itshak, Yishaq, Jitzhak, Yitchak
- Variant forms: Isaac, Ishak, Yitzchok

Yitzhak ( (יִצְחָק)) is a male first name, and is Hebrew for Isaac. Yitzhak may refer to:

== People ==
- Yitzhak, one of the patriarchs of the Israelites
- Yitzhak ha-Sangari, rabbi who converted the Khazars to Judaism
- Yitzhak Aharonovich (born 1950), Israeli politician
- Yitzhak Apeloig (born 1944), Israeli computational chemistry professor and President of the Technion
- Yitzhak Arad (1926–2021), Israeli historian
- Yitzhak Ben-Aharon (1906–2006), Israeli politician
- Yitzhak Ben-Zvi (1884–1963), Israeli politician and President
- Yitzhak Danziger (1916–1977), Israeli sculptor
- Yitzhak Hatuel (born 1962), Israeli Olympic foil fencer
- Yitzhak Hofi (1927–2014), Israeli general
- Yitzhak Laor (born 1948), Israeli poet
- Yitzhak Mastai (born 1966), Israeli professor of chemistry
- Yitzhak Molcho (born 1945), Israeli lawyer
- Yitzhak Mordechai (born 1944), Israeli general and politician
- Yitzhak Navon (1921–2015), Israel politician and President
- Yitzhak "Vicky" Peretz (1953–2021), Israeli Olympic footballer
- Yitzhak Rabin (1922–1995), Israeli politician and Prime Minister
- Yitzhak Sadeh (1890–1952), Israeli general
- Yitzhak Schwartz, birth name of Irving Fields (1915–2016), American pianist and composer
- Yitzhak Shamir (1915–2012), Israeli politician and Prime Minister
- Yitzhak Tshuva (born 1948), Israeli businessman
- Yitzhak Y. Melamed (born 1968), Israeli-American philosophy professor
- Yitzhak Yosef (born 1952), Israeli chief rabbi

== Fiction ==
- Yitzhak, fictional character in the musical and film Hedwig and the Angry Inch

== See also ==
- Itzhak
- Yitzhaki, people with this surname
