= ISAC =

ISAC may refer to:

- internet Speech Audio Codec (as "iSAC"), a wideband speech codec
- Institute for the Study of American Cultures, a defunct organization devoted to the study of pre-Columbian contact between the Old and New Worlds
- Institute for the Study of Ancient Cultures, a multidisciplinary research center at the University of Chicago
- Information Sharing and Analysis Center, a cybersecurity non-profit organization
- Indian Space Research Organisation Satellite Centre, the lead ISRO centre for technology testing and spacecraft assembly integration in India
- Immune stimulating antibody conjugate, a monoclonal antibody
- Idol Star Athletics Championships, Korean biannual Athletics gathering
- Integrated Sensing and Communication, a 6G wireless network capability

== People ==
- Isac, variant spelling of Isaac (name)
- Emil Isac (1886–1954), Romanian poet, dramatist, short story writer and critic
- Mihaiela Isac, Romanian and Canadian metallurgist
- Isac Ludo (1894–1973), Romanian writer and political figure
- Isac Peltz (1899–1980), Romanian prose writer and journalist
- Isac Silvestre (born 2006), Brazilian football defender

== Other ==
- Vadul lui Isac is a village in Cahul District, Moldova
- the Isac is a French river in the Loire-Atlantique department
