= Valu lui Traian =

Commune in Constanța, Romania

- Commune
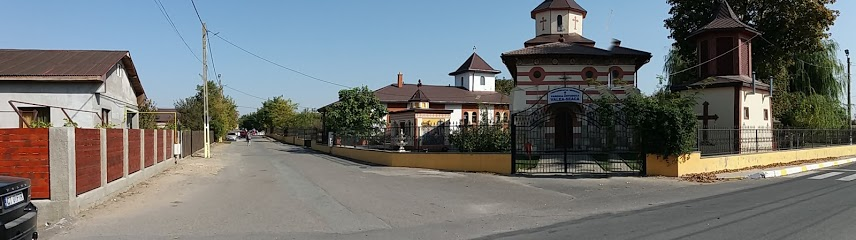

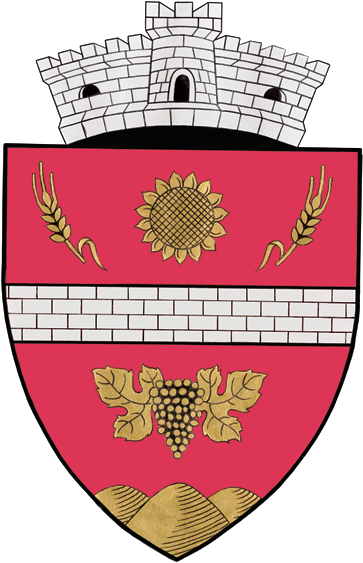
- Coat of arms

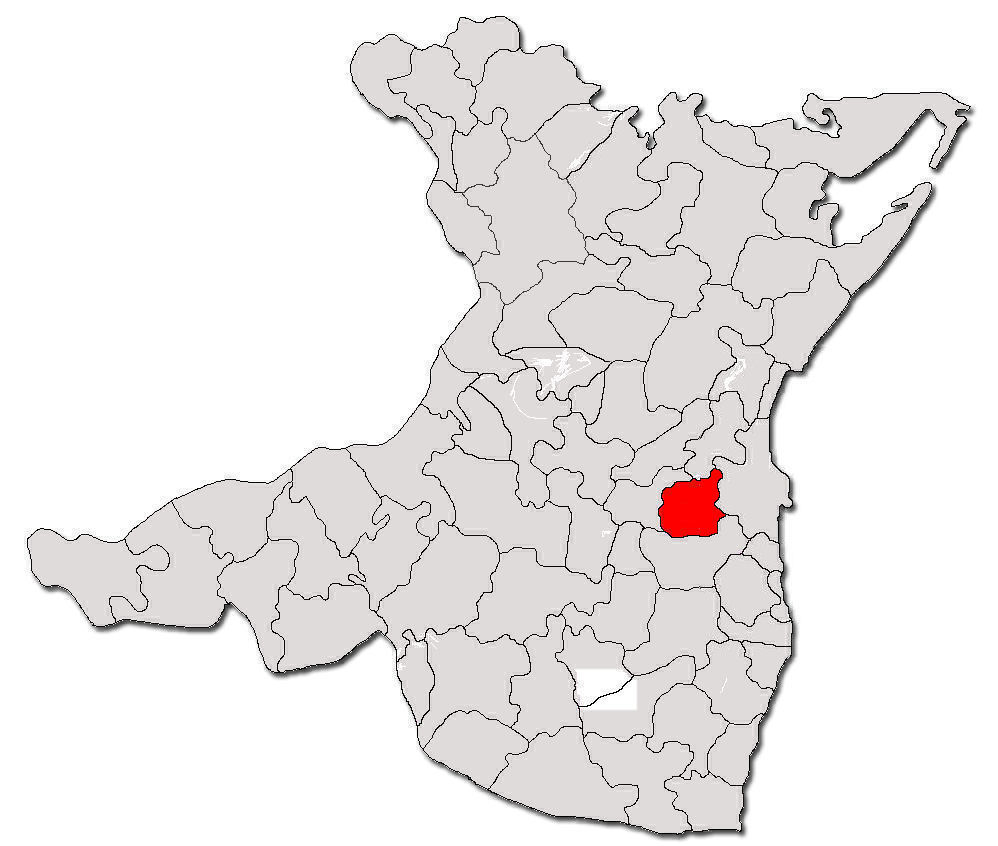
- Location in Constanța County

- Location in Romania
- Coordinates: 44°9′54″N 28°27′18″E
- Country: Romania
- County: Constanța

Government
  - Mayor (2020–2024): Florin Mitroi (PNL)
- Area: 63.29 km^{2} (24.44 sq mi)
- Population (2021-12-01): 16,617
  - Density: 262.6/km^{2} (680.0/sq mi)
- Time zone: UTC+02:00 (EET)
  - Summer (DST): UTC+03:00 (EEST)
- Vehicle reg.: CT
- Website: www.valu-lui-traian.ro

Valu lui Traian (Romanian pronunciation: [ˈvalu luj traˈjan]; historical name: Hasancea, Turkish: Hasançay) is a commune in Constanța County, Northern Dobruja, Romania.

The commune was established in 1897, under the name Hasancea. In 1925 it was renamed Valu lui Traian (Trajan's Wall), after the vallum located nearby. In 1967, the village of Valea Seacă (historical name: Omurcea, Turkish: Ömürçay) was merged into Valu lui Traian, now the commune's only village.

== Nature reserve ==
There is a nature reserve north-east of Valu lui Traian village, in the Medgidia Plateau. It is located on top of an archaeological site, remnants of a Roman defensive system, and houses several species of xerophilous plants and shrubs on its slopes.

== Demographics ==
At the 2002 census, 81.5% of inhabitants were Romanians, 15% Tatars, 2.1% Roma and 1.2% Turks. 82% were Orthodox Christian and 16.1% Muslim.

At the 2011 census, Valu lui Traian had 9,815 Romanians (85.71%), 6 Hungarians (0.05%), 213 Roma (1.86%), 3 Germans (0.03%), 191 Turks (1.67%), 1,189 Tatars (10.38%), 7 Lipovans (0.06%), 20 others (0.17%), 8 with undeclared ethnicity (0.07%).

At the 2021 census Valu lui Traian had a population of 16,617 with a majority of Romanians (74.14%) and minorities of Tatars (6.61%), Turks (1.43%), Roma (1.25%), Lipovans (0.07%), Greeks (0.06%), Bulgarians (0.02%), others (0.23%) and unknown (16.19%).
