= Mar Isaac =

Mar Isaac may refer to:

- Mar Isaac (bishop), early bishop of Seleucia
- Isaac the Syrian, d. ca. 700
- Mar Isaac of Firuz Shapur, Gaon of the Jewish Yeshiva academy in Firuz Shapur, Babylon
