= Army cricket team =

There have been several Army cricket teams to have played first-class cricket:

- British Army cricket team
- Services cricket team
- Nepal Army Club
- New Zealand Army cricket team
- South Africa Army cricket team
- Sri Lanka Army Sports Club cricket team
