= Itzhak =

Itzhak (Hebrew: יצחק) is a Hebrew given name and surname, meaning Isaac. Notable people with the name include:

== Given name ==
- Itzhak Arnon (1909–2005), Israeli agronomist
- Itzhak Bars (born 1943), American theoretical physicist at the University of Southern California
- Itzhak Ben David (1931–2007), Israeli cyclist
- Itzhak Bentov (1923–1979), Czech-born Israeli American scientist, inventor, mystic
- Itzhak Brook (born 1941), Adjunct Professor of Pediatrics and Medicine at Georgetown University School of Medicine
- Itzhak de Laat (born 1994), Dutch short track speed skater
- Itzhak Drucker (born 1947), Israeli football defender
- Itzhak Fintzi (born 1933), Bulgarian film and stage actor
- Itzhak Gilboa (born 1963), Israeli economist
- Itzhak Fisher, vice president at Nielsen Holdings
- Itzhak Katzenelson (1886–1944), Jewish teacher, poet and dramatist
- Itzhak Levanon (1944-2023), Israeli ambassador to Egypt from 2009 to 2011
- Isaac Luria, also known as Itzhak Luria (1534–1572), Ottoman Syrian rabbi and mystic
- Itzhak Luria (born 1940), Israeli olympic swimmer
- Itzhak Mamistvalov (born 1979), Israeli Paralympic swimmer
- Itzhak Nir (1940–2012), Israeli Olympic competitive sailor
- Itzhak Nissan, chairman and CEO of Meteor Aerospace Ltd., a privately owned Israeli Defense and Security company that Nissan founded
- Itzhak Perlman (born 1945), Israeli-American violinist, conductor, and pedagogue
- Itzhak Rashkovsky (born 1955), Russian-Israeli violinist and pedagogue
- Itzhak Schneor (1925–2011), Israeli footballer and manager
- Itzhak Shum (born 1948), Israeli footballer and manager
- Itzhak Stern (1901–1969), Polish-Israeli Jewish man who worked for Oskar Schindler and assisted him in his rescue activities
- Itzhak Vissoker (born 1944), Israeli footballer

== Surname ==
- Gil Itzhak (born 1993), Israeli footballer
- Miron Itzhak (born 1953), psychologist
- Ran Itzhak (born 1987), Israeli footballer

== See also ==
- Isaac (name)
- Yitzhak
