= John Isaac (cricketer) =

English cricketer

John Isaac DSO
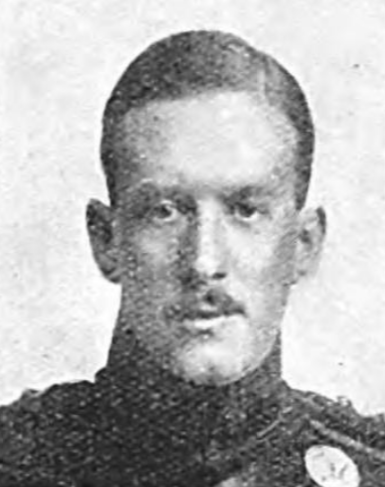
- Born: John Edmund Valentine Isaac; February 14, 1880; Powick Court, Worcestershire, England
- Died: May 9, 1915 (aged 35); Fromelles, France
- Cause of death: Killed in action
- Occupation: Cricketer

John Edmund Valentine Isaac DSO (14 February 1880 – 9 May 1915) was an English first-class cricketer: a right-handed batsmen who played ten matches in South Africa and England between 1906 and 1908. He was born at Powick Court, Worcestershire.

Educated at Harrow School, Isaac's first-class debut came for the South Africa Army cricket team in the only match of that standard they ever played, when they met Marylebone Cricket Club (MCC) at Thara Tswane, Pretoria in January 1906. The MCC side were far too strong for their opponents and won by an innings, Isaac making 0 and 8. This match was chiefly notable for Schofield Haigh's feat of taking four wickets in as many balls in the Army's second innings.

In 1906–07 he played four times for Orange Free State in the Currie Cup, though his highest score was only 34 not out. In Isaac's eight visits to the crease he was four times out bowled to a man who would take six or more wickets in that innings (JJ Kotze 8-57, RO Schwarz 7-25, AEE Vogler 6-34 & 8-24).

In 1907 and 1908, Isaac made five appearances for Worcestershire County Cricket Club, but never made more than 13 and never played first-class cricket again.

== Death and aftermath ==
During the First World War Isaac was to serve mainly with the 2nd Battalion of his regiment, which arrived on the Western Front in late 1914. He fought in the First Battle of Ypres and was awarded the Distinguished Service Order (DSO), the citation for which, appearing in The London Gazette in December 1914, reads as follows:

Has shown conspicuous gallantry on all occasions. Has always obtained reliable and valuable information when required. On October 24th he guided a unit to a critical point with great skill, which resulted in checking the enemy. Was wounded in the engagement.

Captain Isaac was killed in action, at Fromelles, France at the age of 35 during the northern attack of the Battle of Aubers Ridge on 9 May 1915. Initially posted as missing, his body was recovered in April 1921 and identified by the medal ribbons. He was subsequently reburied at New Irish Farm Cemetery, Ypres, West, Belgium.

Isaac's brother Arthur and nephew Herbert also played first-class cricket.

== See also ==
- List of solved missing person cases
