= Brian Booth (Tasmanian cricketer) =

Australian cricketer (1924–2022)

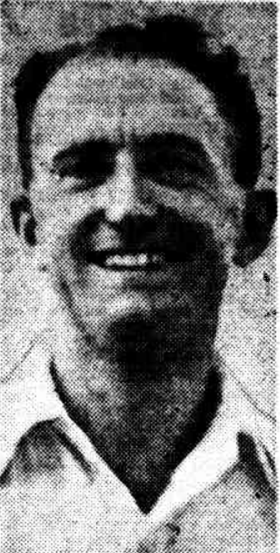

Personal information
- Full name: Ernest Brian Nelson Booth
- Born: 30 September 1924; Scottsdale, Tasmania, Australia
- Died: 9 April 2022 (aged 97); Riverside, Tasmania, Australia
- Batting: Left-handed
- Role: Batsman

Domestic team information
- Years: Team
- 1946-1960: Tasmania

Career statistics
Competition	FC
Matches	8
Runs scored	282
Batting average	18.80
100s/50s	1/0
Top score	113
Balls bowled	16
Wickets	0
Bowling average	–
5 wickets in innings	0
10 wickets in match	0
Best bowling	–
Catches/stumpings	1/0
- Source: Cricinfo, 20 September 2021

Ernest Brian Nelson Booth (30 September 1924 – 9 April 2022) was an Australian cricketer. He played eight first-class matches for Tasmania between 1946 and 1960.

Booth attended Launceston High School and the University of Tasmania. He served in the Royal Australian Navy in the Pacific during World War II. Later he worked as a chartered accountant in Launceston.

Booth was a left-handed middle-order batsman. He made a century against Victoria in December 1950. Tasmania needed 252 to win and were two wickets for 10 when Booth went in. He made 113 in 284 minutes and was out with the score at 9 for 237; Tasmania lost by nine runs.

Booth married Marion Davies in Launceston in May 1950. Their marriage produced five children and lasted until his death in the Launceston suburb of Riverside on 9 April 2022, at the age of 97.

== See also ==
- List of Tasmanian representative cricketers
