= Ike (surname) =

Ike is a surname. Notable people with the surname include:

- Chika Ike (born 1985), Nigerian actress
- Chukwuemeka Ike (1931–2020), Nigerian monarch and writer
- Emeka Ike (born 1967), Nigerian actor
- Erina Ike (born 1996), Japanese judoka
- Graham Ike (born 2002), American basketball player
- Ike Gyokuran (1727–1784), Japanese painter
- Karol Ike (1935–2022), Polish-Canadian photographer and cinematographer
- Nobutaka Ike (1916–2005), American academic
- Reiko Ike (born 1953), Japanese actress, singer, and entertainer
- Reverend Ike (1935–2009), American Christian minister and television personality
- Ike no Taiga (1723–1776), Japanese painter
- Yoshihiro Ike (born 1963), Japanese musical artist
- Yukinobu Ike (born 1980), Rugby player

== See also ==
- Ike (disambiguation)
- Ike (given name)
