= Herbert Isaac =

English cricketer

Personal information
- Full name: Herbert Whitmore Isaac
- Born: 11 December 1899; Hallow, Worcester, England
- Died: 28 April 1962 (aged 62); Figtree Farm, Chisekesi, Zambia

Career statistics
Competition	FC
Matches	3
Runs scored	32
Batting average	10.66
100s/50s	0/0
Top score	23
Balls bowled	18
Wickets	0
Bowling average	-
5 wickets in innings	0
10 wickets in match	0
Best bowling	-
Catches/stumpings	0/0
- Source: CricketArchive, 3 May 2009

Herbert Whitmore Isaac (11 December 1899 – 26 April 1962) was an English cricketer who played three first-class games for Worcestershire in 1919 without any great success. None of these games were in the County Championship as Worcestershire did not re-enter this until the following season.

Isaac attended Harrow School, and played for them against Eton College in 1917. In the 1920s and 1930s, he appeared a few times for Settlers v Officials in Kenyan minor matches.

His father, Arthur Isaac, had a more substantial career with Worcestershire, while his uncle John Isaac also played first-class cricket.
