= Numonius Vala =

Name of three ancient Romans

Numonius Vala was a combination of family name (nomen) and cognomen used by ancient Roman men of the gens Numonia. It was the name, or part of the name, of several notable Romans.

== Gaius Numonius Vala ==
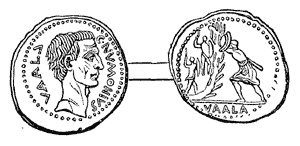
Coin depicting Numonius storming the vallum.

Gaius Numonius Vala is known only from coins, from which it appears that he had obtained renown by storming a vallum, and had hence obtained the surname of Vala, which, according to the usual custom, became hereditary in his family. The coins were struck by one of his descendants in commemoration of the exploit. The one pictured here has on the obverse the head of Numonius, with the inscription C. NVMONIVS VAALA, and on the reverse a man storming the vallum of a camp, which is defended by two others, with the inscription VAALA. Vaala is an ancient form of Vala, just as on the coins of Sulla we find Feelix instead of Felix.

== Numonius Vala of the Epistles ==
Numonius Vala, to whom Horace addresses one of his Epistles (i. 15), appears to have had estates in the neighbourhood of Velia and Salernum, since the poet makes inquiries of Vala about the climate of those places, as he intended to pass the winter in one of them. As this poem was probably written about 22 BC, the friend of Horace was most likely the father of the Numonius Vala below, if not the same person.

== Numonius Vala, legate ==
Numonius Vala was a legate of Publius Quinctilius Varus in 9 AD. He left the infantry when they were attacked by the enemy in the fatal Battle of the Teutoburg Forest and fled with the cavalry to the Rhine, but was overtaken in his flight and slain.
