= Numonia gens =

Roman plebeian family

The gens Numonia, occasionally written Nummonia, was a minor plebeian family at Rome. Members of this gens are first mentioned in the early years of the Empire. Few if any of the Numonii held any Roman magistracies.

== Origin ==
The nomen Numonius belongs to a class of gentilicia ending in -onius, typical of plebeian gentes, or those of Oscan origin. It is likely based on the cognomen nummus, "money".

== Praenomina ==
As was often the case in imperial times, all of the individuals known from the family of the Valae bore the same praenomen, Gaius, as do most of the other Numonii mentioned in inscriptions. However, a set of inscriptions from the ancient Etruscan city of Caere, likely among the oldest, as the individuals named have no cognomina, demonstrate that the Numonii also used Aulus and Lucius. In other inscriptions we find examples of Gnaeus and Quintus.

== Branches and cognomina ==
The only distinct family of the Numonia gens bore the surname Vala, also spelled Vaala, apparently obtained by an ancestor of the family who had stormed a vallum. (Note: A vallum was a rampart, or palisade. Vaala is an archaic spelling.) A coin of the gens depicts this feat.

== Members ==
This list includes abbreviated praenomina. For an explanation of this practice, see filiation.

=== Numonii Valae ===
- Gaius Numonius C. f. Vala, an acquaintance of Horace, who lived near Velia and Salernum in Campania. About 22 BC, Horace, seeking a place to spend the winter, addressed a letter to Vala, inquiring as to the climate of the area. He may be the same Gaius Numonius Vala who was quattuorvir monetalis in 41 BC.
- Gaius Numonius C. f. C. n. Vala, a legate under the command of Publius Quinctilius Varus in AD 9, fled the Battle of Teutoburg Forest, accompanying the Roman cavalry to the Rhine, but he was overtaken by the Germans and slain.
- Gaius Numonius Vala, buried at Philae in Egypt, according to an inscription dating from AD 25.

=== Others ===
- Aulus Numonius A. f., named in an inscription from Caere in Etruria.
- Gaius Numonius L. f., named in an inscription from Caere.
- Gaius Numonius A. f., named in an inscription from Caere.
- Numonia L. f., named in an inscription from Caere.
- Numonia Secunda, named in an inscription from Tridentum in the province of Venetia et Histria.
- Gaius Numonius, named in an inscription from Lambaesis in Numidia.
- Gaius Nummonius, named in an inscription from Rome.
- Numonia Alexandrea, buried at Catina in Sicily, aged twenty-five.
- Gnaeus Numonius Cn. l. Aristo, a freedman named in an inscription from Rome.
- Numonia Bellia, wife of Julius Alexander, and mother of Julius Alexius, Julius Felix, Julius Gallonius, and Numonia Belliosa, buried with her husband at Lugdunum.
- Numonia Belliosa, daughter of Julius Alexander and Numonia Bellia.
- Numonia Candida, buried at Ammaedara in Africa, aged thirty-eight.
- Gaius Numonius C. l. Canthus, a freedman named in an inscription from Rome.
- Quintus Numonius Q. l. Dibus, a freedman, named in an inscription from Salernum.
- Gaius Numonius Felix, the father of Gaius Numonius Rufus.
- Numonia Q. l. Gaza, a freedwoman named in an inscription from Salernum.
- Gaius Numonius Honoratus, named in a list of soldiers of the Praetorian Guard stationed at Rome, circa AD 200.
- Numonia Q. f. Marciana, the wife of Manilius Justus, buried at Volcei in Lucania.
- Numonia L. l. Megisthe, erected a monument at Rome for herself and her husband, Gnaeus Pompeius Prothesilavus.
- Gaius Numonius C. l. Miccalio, a freedman buried at Rome.
- Numonia Musa, a freedwoman formerly belonging to the wife of Gaius Numonius.
- Gaius Numonius C. l. Phoenix, a freedman buried at Rome.
- Gaius Numonius Pinarius, one of the Seviri Augustales, named in an inscription from Interpromium in Samnium.
- Aulus Numonius Rogatus, buried at Ammaedara, aged seventy-five.
- Gaius Numonius C. f. Rufus, buried at Rome, aged fifteen.
- Gaius Numonius Secundus, buried at Novaricia in Mauretania Caesariensis, aged seventy-five, together with his wife, Fabia Rogata, aged sixty-five.
- Numonius Sodalis, buried at Castellum Elefantum in Numidia.
- Gaius Numonius Varia, named in an inscription from Opitergium in Venetia et Histria.
- Numonia Veneria, wife of Nannaeius Quetinus, buried at Paestum in Lucania, aged twenty-seven.
- Gaius Numonius Venulus, buried at Castellum Elefantum, aged seventy-five.

== See also ==
- List of Roman gentes

== Bibliography ==
- Quintus Horatius Flaccus (Horace), Epistulae.
- Marcus Velleius Paterculus, Compendium of Roman History.
- Joseph Hilarius Eckhel, Doctrina Numorum Veterum (The Study of Ancient Coins, 1792–1798).
- Dictionary of Greek and Roman Biography and Mythology, William Smith, ed., Little, Brown and Company, Boston (1849).
- Theodor Mommsen et alii, Corpus Inscriptionum Latinarum (The Body of Latin Inscriptions, abbreviated CIL), Berlin-Brandenburgische Akademie der Wissenschaften (1853–present).
- Wilhelm Henzen, Ephemeris Epigraphica: Corporis Inscriptionum Latinarum Supplementum (Journal of Inscriptions: Supplement to the Corpus Inscriptionum Latinarum, abbreviated EE), Institute of Roman Archaeology, Rome (1872–1913).
- René Cagnat et alii, L'Année épigraphique (The Year in Epigraphy, abbreviated AE), Presses Universitaires de France (1888–present).
- George Davis Chase, "The Origin of Roman Praenomina", in Harvard Studies in Classical Philology, vol. VIII (1897).
- Paul von Rohden, Elimar Klebs, & Hermann Dessau, Prosopographia Imperii Romani (The Prosopography of the Roman Empire, abbreviated PIR), Berlin (1898).
- Atti della Accademia di Scienze morali e politiche della Societa nazionale di Scienze, Lettre ed Arti di Napoli (Proceedings of the Academy of Moral Sciences and the National Society of Political Science, Letters and Arts in Naples, abbreviated AAN).
- Stéphane Gsell, Inscriptions Latines de L'Algérie (Latin Inscriptions from Algeria, abbreviated ILAlg), Edouard Champion, Paris (1922–present).
