= Upper Trajan's Wall =

Roman Walls in Romania ("Greuthungi's Wall" -also called "Upper Trajan's Wall"- is in dark green)

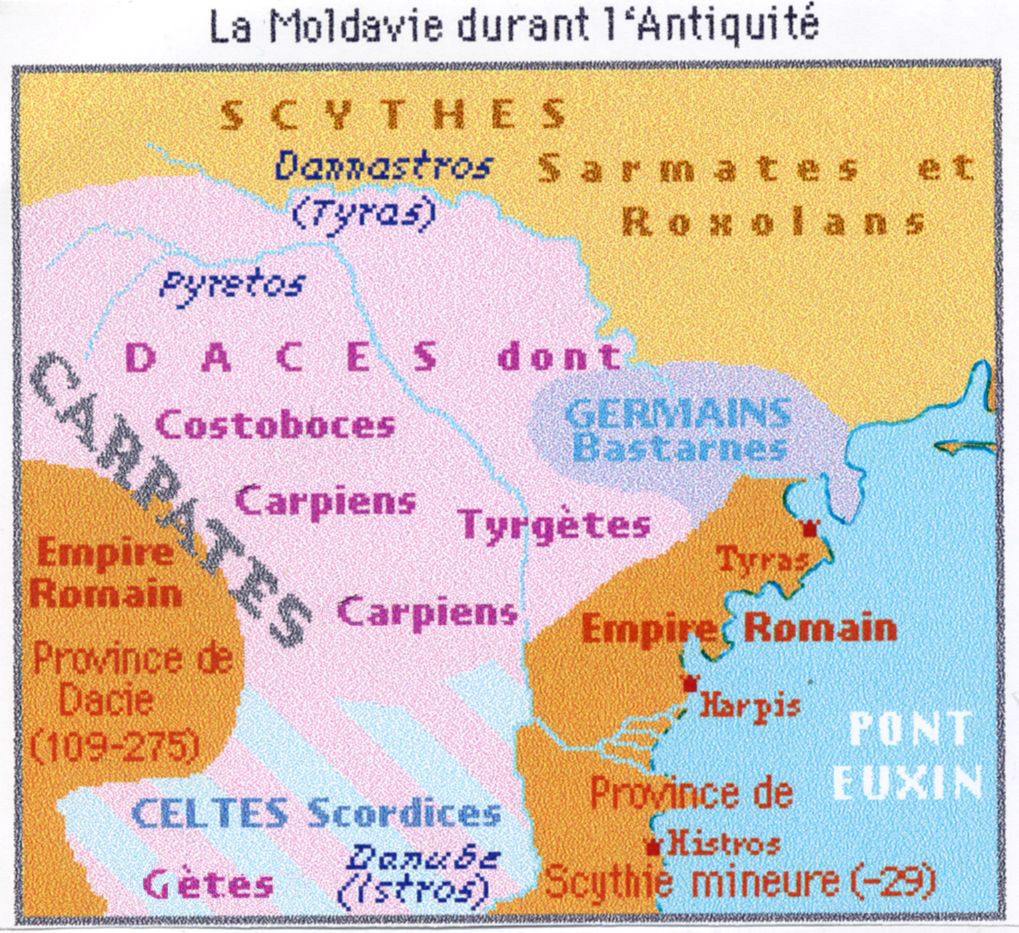
Trajan's Moldova (in light brown) possibly protected in the north by the Upper Trajan's Wall

The Upper Trajan's Wall is the modern name given to a fortification located in the central area of modern Moldavia. Some scholars consider it to be of Roman origin, while others think it was built in the third/fourth century by the Germanic Greuthungi to defend their borders against the Huns. It may also have been called Greuthungian Wall in later Roman accounts, but this is uncertain owing to a single polysemic manuscript occurrence in the works of Ammianus Marcellinus.

== Characteristics ==
The wall stretches 120 kilometres from the Dniester River in the Teleneşti district to the Prut River. In Romania the remains of the wall can be found in Tiganasi, Carniceni, Sendreni and Tocsomeni.

It crosses Moldova from the Prut River to the Nistru River, from the town of Leova to that of Teghina, going past the villages of Trojan Ialpugeni, Caracui, Sărăţica Nouă (Leova), Pervomaisk, Gradiste, Coştangalia, Satu Nou (Cimislia), Ciufleşti, Baimaclia, Salcuta, Marianovca-de-sus, Zaim, Causeni, Chircăieşti (Causeni), Chitcani and Copanca. According to I. Hîncu, it has a length of 120 km, its original height ranged between 3-4 m, width - 10-15m, being augmented by a trench dug to the north, depth: 2-3 m. Currently its height is 0.5 m.

Some scholars, such as Vasile Nedelciuc, argue that the turf Wall was built initially by the Romans, because it has a ditch facing north, away from Roman territory. Under this hypothesis Emperor Trajan made the first construction of the turf wall around 110 AD, in order to protect the coastal area from the Danube delta as far as Tyras.

Others, such as the historian Peter Heather, affirm it was built by the local Germanic tribes, mainly as a defense against raiders from Central Asia (Attila's Huns). Historian Thomas S. Burns is more reluctant, and wishes for better dating data. The identification of the geographical feature in Moldavia with the passage in Ammianus Marcellinus has been proposed by the Romanian historian Radu Vulpe in 1957. Historian Herwig Wolfram questions the emendation given to the passage in Ammianus Marcellinus necessary to read it as being about a wall.

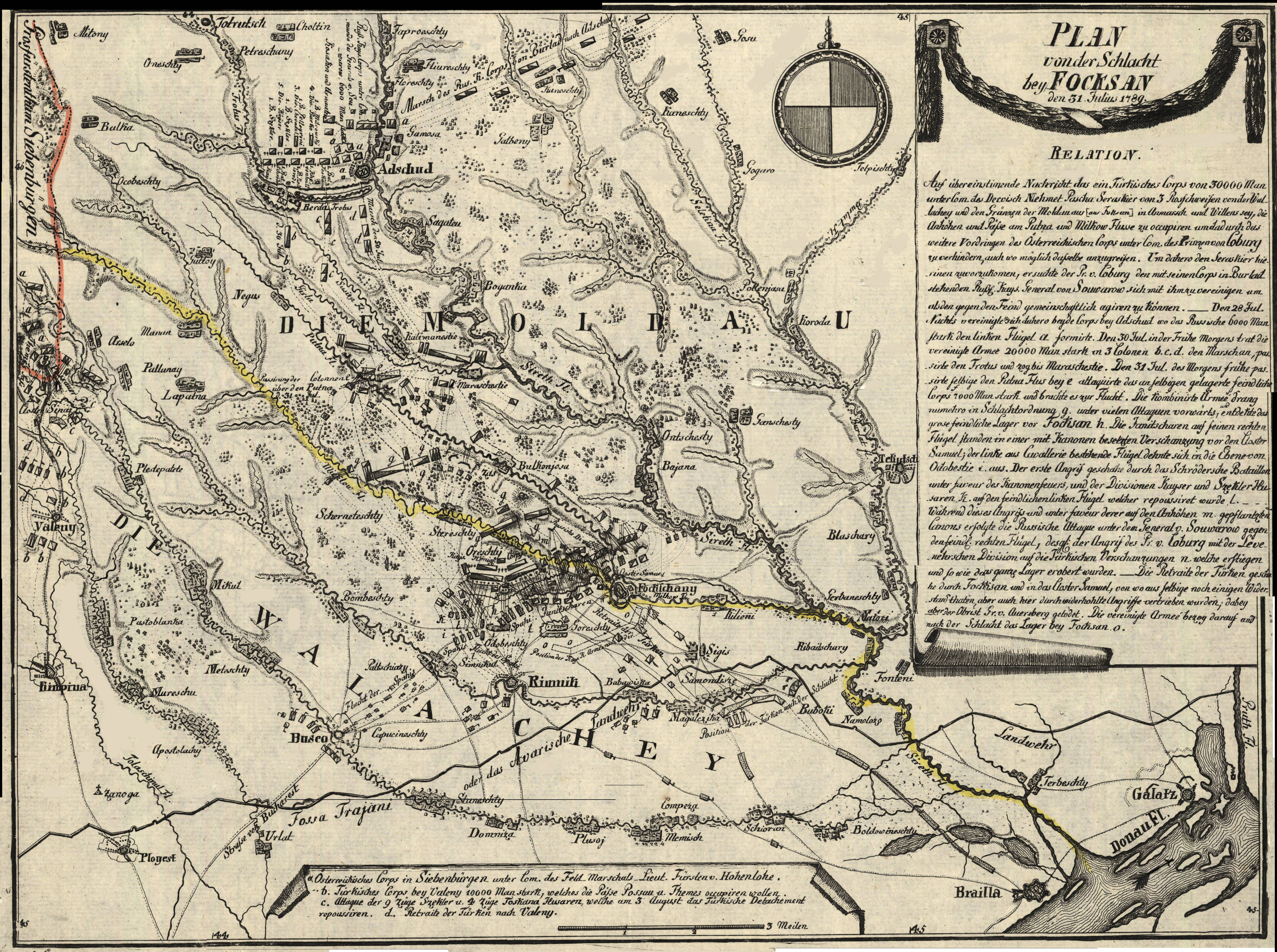
1789 map depicting the wall as fossa Trajani

== See also ==
- Trajan's Wall
- Southern Trajan's Wall (in Bessarabia)
- History of Moldova
