= Vallum =

Whole or a portion of the fortifications of a Roman camp

Vallum is either the whole or a portion of the fortifications of a Roman camp. The vallum usually comprised an earthen or turf rampart (agger) with a wooden palisade on top, with a deep outer ditch (fossa). The name is derived from vallus (a stake), and properly means the palisade which ran along the outer edge of the top of the agger, but is usually used to refer to the whole fortification.

== Characteristics ==
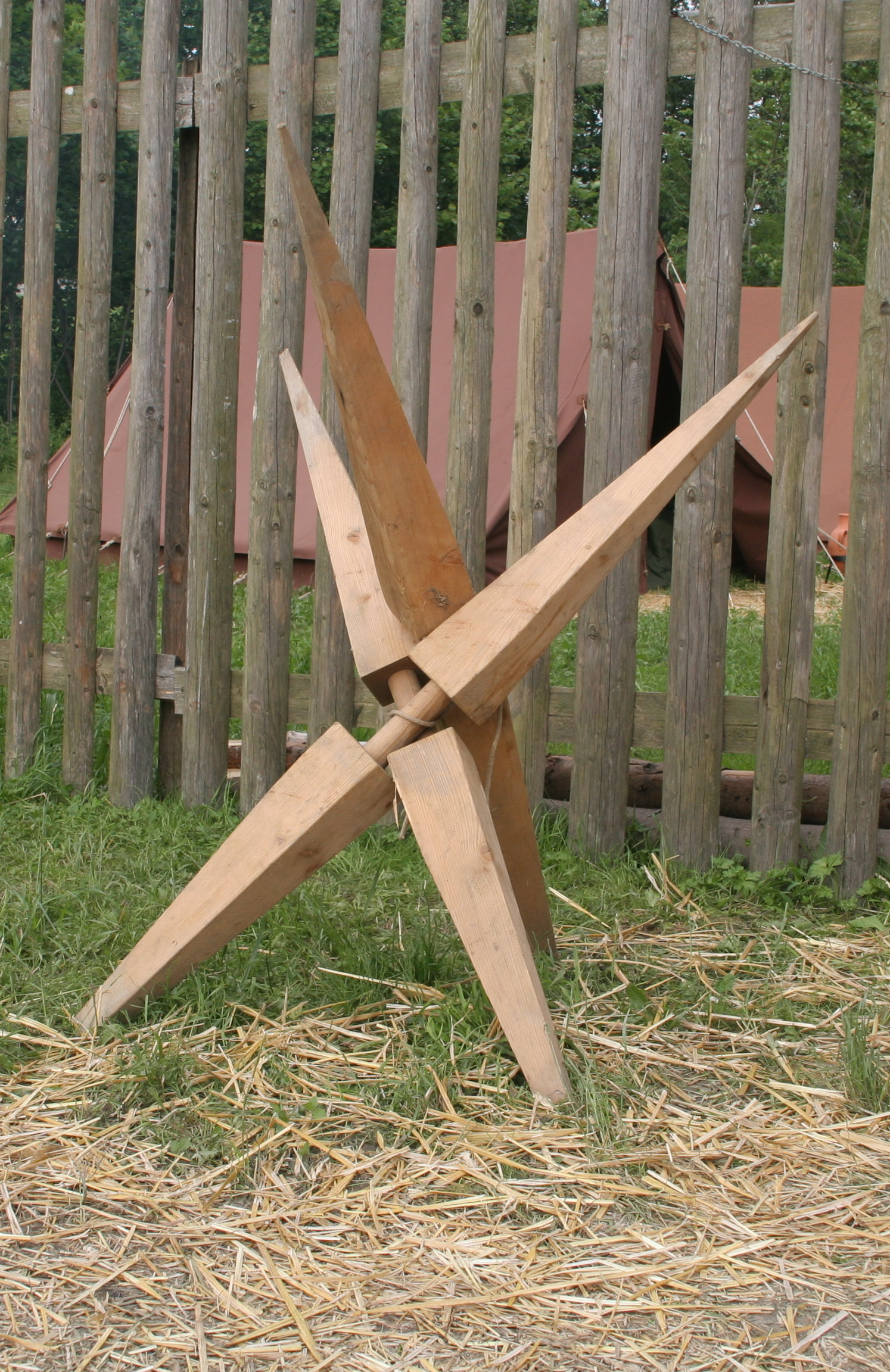
Valli (Sudes) combined to form a Czech hedgehog.

The stake-like valli (χάρακες) of which the vallum palisade was composed are described by Polybius (xviii.18.1, Excerpt. Antiq. xvii.14) and Livy (Liv. xxxiii.5), who make a comparison between the vallum of the Greeks and that of the Romans, very much to the advantage of the latter. Both used for valli young trees or arms of larger trees, with the side branches on them; but the valli of the Greeks were much larger and had more branches than those of the Romans, which had either two or three, or at the most four branches, and these generally on the same side. The Greeks placed their valli in the agger at considerable intervals, the spaces between them being filled up by the branches; the Romans fixed theirs close together, and made the branches interlace, and sharpened their points carefully. Hence the Greek vallus could easily be taken hold of by its large branches and pulled from its place, and when it was removed a large opening was left in the vallum. The Roman vallus, on the contrary, presented no convenient handle, required very great force to pull it down, and even if removed left a very small opening. The Greek valli were cut on the spot; the Romans prepared theirs beforehand.(Polyb. l.c.; Virg. Georg. iii.346, 347; Cic. Tusc. ii.16). They were made of any strong wood, but oak was preferred.

While on the march, each soldier carried three or four strong wooden stakes each at least 1.5 m (5 ft) long and pointed at both ends. A number of these have been found in excavations, sufficiently well-preserved to show that they were "waisted", that is narrowed at the centre. It is clear that these could not have been used on their own to form the palisade of the vallum constructed around a temporary marching camp; they would have had gaps between wide enough for an attacker to pass through with ease. One suggestion is that the "waist" facilitated them being tied together loosely in threes to form a kind of caltrop or Czech hedgehog that could be placed on the rampart (agger) of the vallum. It is likely that these would be augmented with whatever was to hand, such as tree branches or thorn bushes.

== Usage ==
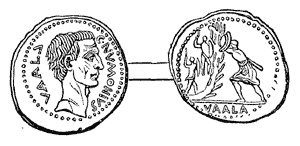
Coin depicting Numonius Vala attacking a vallum.

In the operations of a siege, when the place could not be taken by storm, and it became necessary to establish a blockade, this was done by drawing defences similar to those of a camp around the town, which was then said to be circumvallatum. Such a circumvallation, besides cutting off all communication between the town and the surrounding country, formed a defence against the sallies of the besieged. There was often a double line of fortifications, the inner against the town, and the outer against a force that might attempt to raise the siege. In this case the army was encamped between the two lines of works.

== Construction ==
This kind of circumvallation, which the Greeks called ἀποτειχισμός and περιτειχισμός, was employed by the Peloponnesians in the siege of Plataea (Thucyd. ii.78, iii.20‑23). Their lines consisted of two walls (apparently of turf) at the distance of 16 feet, which surrounded the city in the form of a circle. Between the walls were the huts of the besiegers. The walls had battlements (ἐπάλξεις), and at every ten battlements was a tower, filling up by its depth the whole space between the walls. There was a passage for the besiegers through the middle of each tower. On the outside of each wall was a ditch (τάφρος). This description would almost exactly answer for the Roman mode of circumvallation, of which some of the best examples are that of Carthage in modern-day Tunisia by Scipio (Appian, Punic. 119, &c.), that of Numantia in modern-day Spain by Scipio (Appian, Hispan. 90), and that of Alesia in modern-day France by Caesar (Bell. Gall. vii.72, 73). The towers in such lines were similar to those used in attacking fortified places, but not so high, and of course not moveable. (Lipsius, de Milit. Rom. v.5, in Oper. iii. pp156, 157; Poliorc. ii.1, in Oper. iii.283).

The vallum-building technique was later taken by neighbouring people, such as the Byzantines and the Goths.

== Examples ==
Examples of valla include:

- "The Vallum", a component of Hadrian's Wall (England, Roman)
- Trajan's Wall (Romania, Byzantine Age)
- Athanaric's Wall (Romania, Moldova, 2-4th century, probably made by the Goths)

== Etymology ==
1. Latin vallus derives from Proto-Indo-European *walso-, " a post". Vallus is the source of English wall.

The word vallus is sometimes used as equivalent to vallum (Caesar, Bell. Civ. iii.63).
