= Athanaric's Wall =

- Lower Trajan's Wall (Athanaric's Wall on the map) was located just north of the Danube delta

Immovable Monument of National Significance of Ukraine
- Official name: Земляне укріплення "Траянів вал" (Earth fortification "Trajan's Wall")
- Type: Archaeology
- Reference no.: 150024-Н

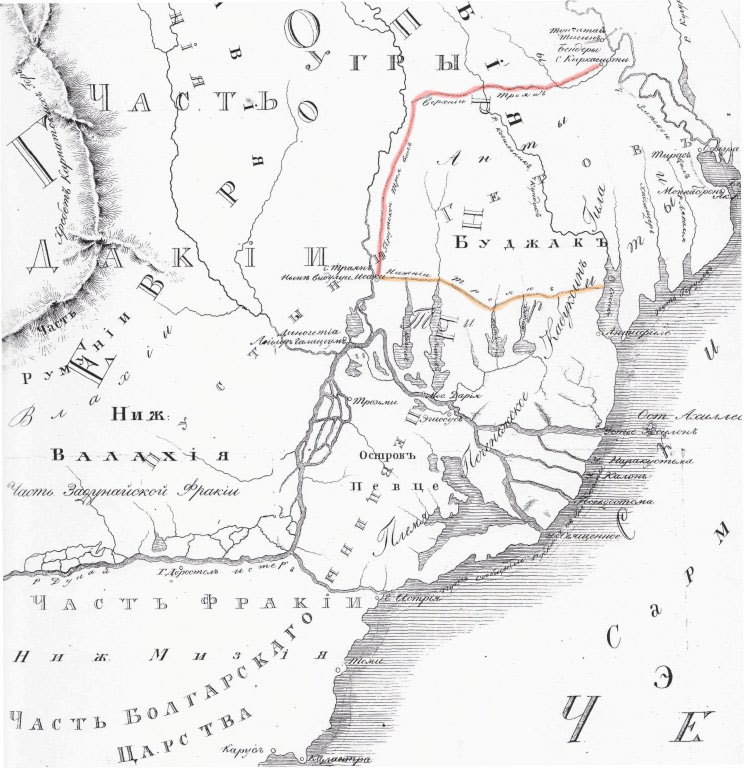
Map of the "Roman" Walls north of the Danube delta

Athanaric's Wall, also called Lower Trajan's Wall or Southern Trajan's Wall, was a fortification line probably erected by Athanaric (the king of the Thervingi), between the banks of river Gerasius (modern Prut) and the Danube to the land of Taifali (modern Oltenia). Most probably, Athanaric's Wall has reused the old Roman limes called Limes Transalutanus.

== Structure ==
Historian Theodore Mommsen wrote that Romans built a defensive wall from the Danube delta to Tyras. He wrote:

The Walls, which, three metres in height and two meters in thickness, with broad outer fosse and many remains of forts, stretch in two almost parallel lines ... from the Pruth to the Dniester ... may be also Roman.

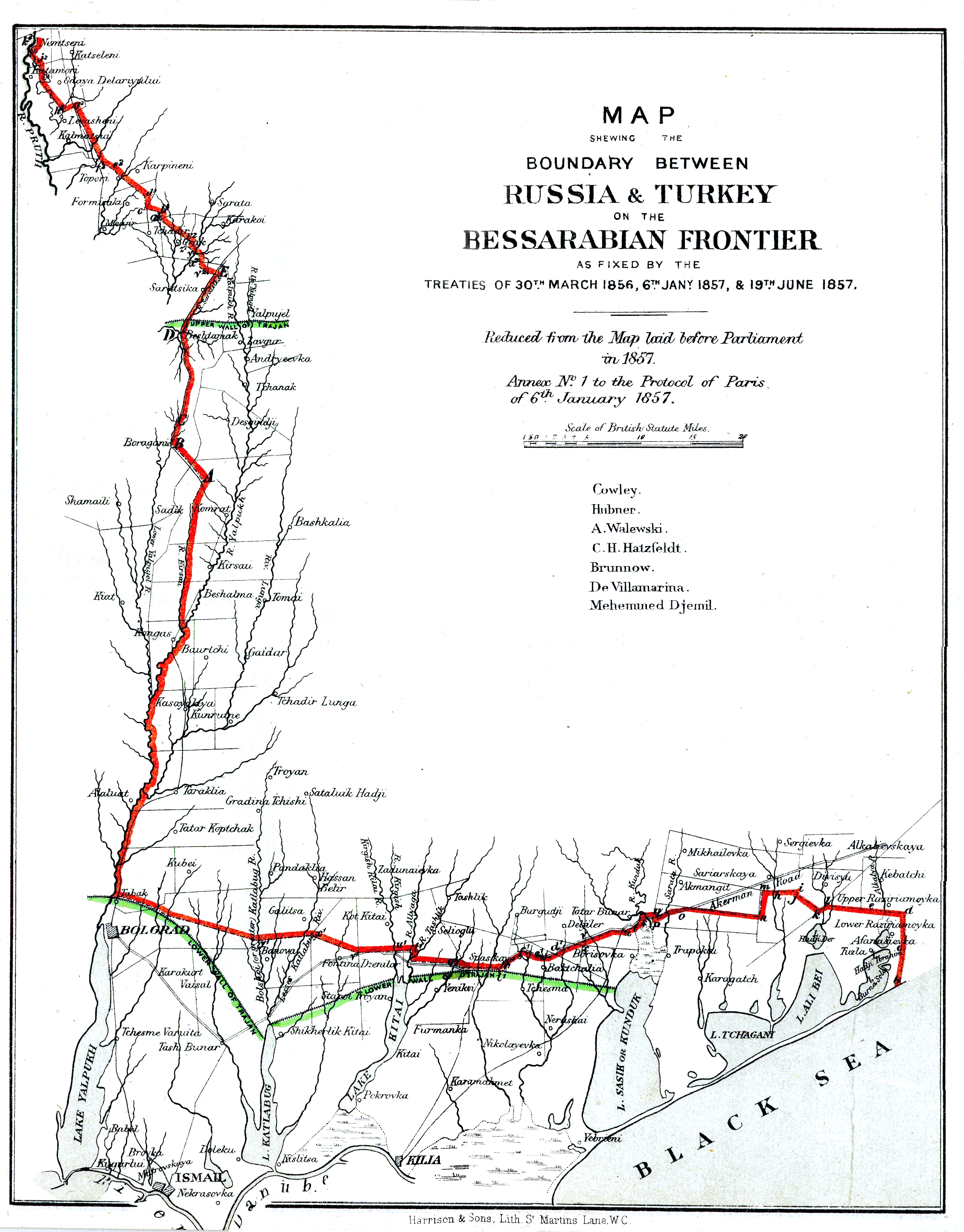
Old Russian map showing clearly the Lower Trajan Wall (in green color)

The structure is made of earthen walls and palisades, with an elevation of only three meters (which is mostly eroded away).

It stretches from Romania Buciumeni-Tiganesti-Tapu to Stoicani and after that it enters Moldova. In southern Moldova, it stretches another 126 km from the village of Vadul lui Isac in the Cahul District by the Prut River, and then goes into Ukraine ending at Lake Sasyk by Tatarbunar.

Some historians think that the southern Trajan Wall reached the city of Tyras, when was annexed by emperor Nero. Indeed, a Roman bronze coin was found during excavations that discovered evidences of the original construction in the first century

In the 19th century the coat of arms of the Cahul uyezd of Bessarabia, Russian Empire, incorporated the image of "Trajan's Wall".

== Historical debate ==
Some academics such as Dorel Bondoc think that the wall was built by the Romans, because it required a great deal of knowledge and a workforce that barbarians like Athanaric did not have.

Bondoc wrote that "[The Wall's] huge size means the need of considerable material and human resources, a condition that could be met only by the Roman Empire ... the period of time when it was built stretched from Constantine the Great to Valentinian I and Valens".

Some scholars, like Vasile Nedelciuc, argue that the turf Wall was built initially by the Romans during Nero rule from the Prut river to Tyras, even because it has a ditch facing north. He argues that later it was enlarged by Athanaric, but only until Sasyk lagoon.

== See also ==
- Upper Trajan's Wall
- Trajan's Wall
- Limes Moesiae
- Limes Romanus
- Limes Transalutanus
- Pietroasele

== Bibliography ==
- Emanuel Constantin Antoche, Marcel Tanasache, (1990) Le Vallum (Troian) de la Moldavie centrale in "Etudes Roumaines et Aroumaines". Sociétés européennes, no. 8, Paris; Bucharest : [s.n], pp. 130-133, OCLC 502610917
- Kleiman, I. B. (2001). "Defensive Structures on the Territory of Tyras". In Tsetskhladze, Gocha R. (ed.). North Pontic Archaeology: Recent Discoveries and Studies. Colloquia Pontica. Vol. 6. Leiden: Brill. pp. 53–66. ISBN 9789004120419.
- Rădulescu Adrian, Bitoleanu Ion. Istoria românilor dintre Dunăre și Mare: Dobrogea. Editura Științifică și Enciclopedică, București, 1979
- Heather, Peter. The Goths. The Peoples of Europe. Publisher Wiley. London, 1998 ISBN 0631209328
- Mommsen, Theodore. The Provinces of the Roman Empire. Barnes & Noble Books. New York, 1996 ISBN 0-76070-145-8
- Wacher, J.S. The Roman world. Routledge Publisher. New York, 2002. ISBN 041526314X
