= Yitzhaki =

Yitzhaki (Hebrew: יצחקי) is a Hebrew surname. Notable people with the surname include:

- Avigdor Yitzhaki (1949–2025), Israeli politician
- Barak Yitzhaki (born 1984), Israeli former footballer
- Shlomo Yitzhaki (1944–2023), Israeli economist
- Uriel Yitzhaki (born 1949), Israeli diplomat
- Yaakov Yitzhaki (1846–1917), Russian-born rabbi, scholar, religious Zionist

== See also ==
- Abraham Yizhaki, a 16th-century Greek writer, Talmudic scholar and dayyan
- Shlomo Yitzchaki, known as Rashi (c. 1040–1105), a French rabbi
- Meir Itzhaki, a former Israeli footballer
- Tal Itzhaki (born 1956), an Israeli theatre designer and translator
