= Thomas Rocher =

Australian cricketer (1930–2018)

Personal information
- Born: 17 June 1930; Scottsdale, Tasmania, Australia
- Died: 9 June 2018 (aged 87)

Domestic team information
- Years: Team
- 1959-1960: Tasmania
- Source: Cricinfo, 12 March 2016

Thomas Rocher (17 June 1930 – 9 June 2018) was an Australian cricketer. He played two first-class matches for Tasmania between 1959 and 1960.

== See also ==
- List of Tasmanian representative cricketers
