= Bridestowe Lavender Estate =

Coordinates: 41.1335469°S 147.3518088°E

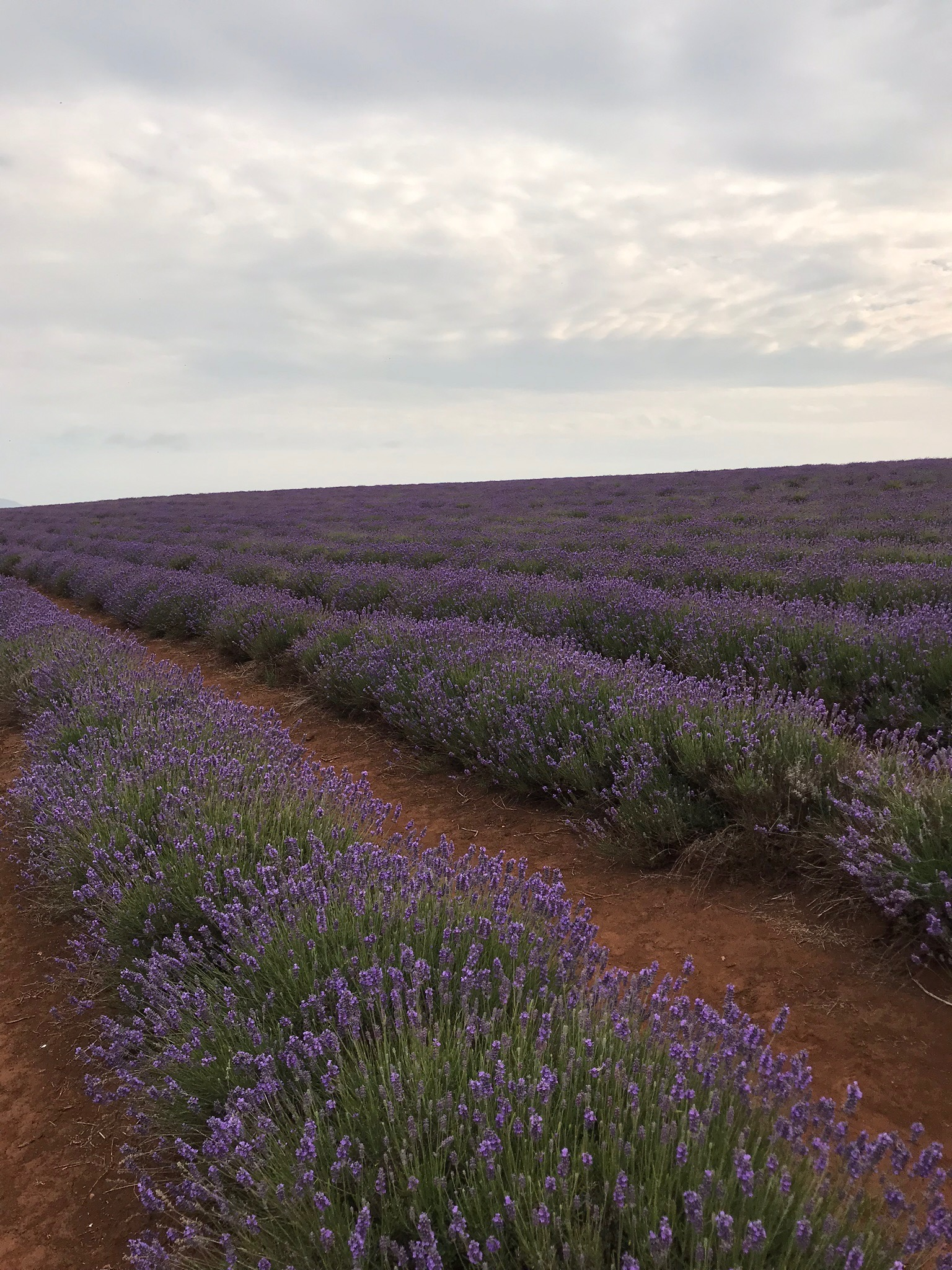
A section of the lavender field at Bridestowe Lavender Estate

Bridestowe Lavender Estate is a lavender farm located in Nabowla, Tasmania, Australia. The farm is believed to be the largest commercial plantation of Lavandula angustifolia in the world. Bridestowe was established in 1922 by Charles Denny, and advanced by his son, Tim Denny. It is named in honour of the birthplace of Charles Denny's wife, the English town of Bridestowe.

== See also ==
- Gardening in Australia
