= Yitzchok =

Yitzchok is a given name, which is the Hebrew pronunciation of the name Isaac, one of the patriarchs of the Israelites. Notable people with the name include:

- Yitzchok Adlerstein, American rabbi
- Yitzchok Breiter, Polish Ukrainian rabbi
- Yitzchok Ezrachi, Israeli rabbi
- Yitzchok Friedman, first Rebbe of the Boyaner Hasidic dynasty
- Yitzchok Dovid Groner, American Australian rabbi
- Yitzchok Hutner, Polish American rabbi
- Yitzchok Isaac Krasilschikov, Russian rabbi
- Yitzchok Zev Soloveitchik, Lithuanian Israeli rabbi
- Yitzchok Sorotzkin, American rabbi
- Yitzchok Sternhartz, Ukrainian Israeli rabbi
- Yitzchok Tuvia Weiss, Jerusalem rabbi
- Yitzchok Yaakov Weiss, Austro-Hungarian rabbi
- Yitzchok Zilber, Russian rabbi
- Yitzchok Zilberstein, Israeli rabbi

== See also ==
- Isaac (name)
- Yitzhak
