= A Squatter's Tale =

1997 novel by Ike Oguine

- Author: Ike Oguine
- Genre: Fiction
- Publication date: 1997
- ISBN: 978-0-435-90655-9

A Squatter's Tale is a 2000 novel by Nigerian author Ike Oguine. The novel focuses on the experience of African immigrants to the United States, and the challenges faced in the contemporary African diaspora. Other themes include discussion of African economic policies.

The novel received the 1997 Association of Nigerian Authors award for fiction. The novel was published as part of the African Writers Series in 2000.
