= Richard Ike Sutton =

American politician

Member of the Hawaii House of Representatives
- In office 1974–1980

Personal details
- Born: April 5, 1915 Honolulu, Hawaii, U.S.
- Died: June 30, 2001 (aged 86)
- Party: Republican
- Spouse: Anne Sutton (m. 1942)
- Education: Stanford Law School

Richard Ike Sutton (April 5, 1915 – June 30, 2001) was an American politician. He served as a member of the Hawaii House of Representatives.

== Life and career ==
Sutton was born in Honolulu, Hawaii. He attended Punahou School and Stanford Law School. He served in the United States Marine Corps.

In 1962, Sutton was a Republican candidate for the Hawaii's at-large district of the United States House of Representatives.

In 1974, Sutton was elected to the Hawaii House of Representatives, serving until 1980. In 1994, he was a candidate for lieutenant governor of Hawaii.

Sutton died in June 2001, at the age of 86.
