= Ike Whittaker =

Australian rules footballer

Personal information
- Full name: Ike Whittaker
- Born: 13 August 1935 (age 91)
- Original team: West Perth
- Height: 181 cm (5 ft 11 in)
- Weight: 95 kg (209 lb)

Playing career^{1}
Years	Club	Games (Goals)
1958–59	Footscray	8 (1)
- ^{1} Playing statistics correct to the end of 1959.

Ike Whittaker (born 13 August 1935) is a former Australian rules footballer who played with Footscray in the Victorian Football League (VFL).
