= Isaac ben Judah =

12th-century rabbi

Rabbi Isaac ben Judah
- יצחק בן יהודה

Personal life
- Born: Lorraine
- Parent: Judah (father)

Religious life
- Religion: Judaism

Isaac ben Judah of Mainz (Hebrew: יצחק בן יהודה) was a Talmudist of the eleventh century; teacher of Solomon ben Isaac (Rashi).

He was a native of Lorraine ("Ha-Pardes," 35a), but settled early in life in Germany, where he studied under Eleazar ha-Gadol.

Isaac occupied successively the positions of head of the rabbinical schools of Mainz and Worms; it was in the latter place that he became the teacher of Rashi. Isaac was one of the greatest Talmudic authorities of his time, and his name is frequently mentioned in rabbinical literature. He was the author of commentaries on the Talmud, some of which are cited by Rashi (Ber. 39a, 57a; R. H. 28a); and his responsa are scattered in the "Pardes ha-Gadol", the "Liḳḳuṭe Pardes", the "Or Zarua", the "Shibbole ha-Leḳeṭ", the "Mordekai", and the responsa of Meir of Rothenburg.

In a French Maḥzor manuscript quoted by Leopold Zunz ("Zur Geschichte und Literatur" p. 622), Isaac is mentioned as having been at one time head of the rabbinical school of Paris; this, however, is highly improbable.
