= Ike Rose =

German-American showman

- Born: Isaac Rosenstamm; December 25, 1865; Norden, Kingdom of Hanover (now Germany)
- Died: August 10, 1935 (aged 69); San Diego, California, U.S.
- Occupation: Showman
- Known for: Rose's Royal Midgets

Ike Rose (born Isaac Rosenstamm; December 25, 1865 – August 10, 1935) was a German-American showman and impresario. He is best known for producing the act known as Rose's Royal Midgets, who performed in vaudeville and toured internationally between the early 1900s and 1950s, in later years managed by his widow.

== Life and career ==
Isaac Rosenstamm was born in Norden, Hanover (now in Lower Saxony, Germany) in 1865. He traveled with his family to the United States as a young child, and grew up in New York City. He was married in 1896 to Clarice Campbell (born Clarissa Molony; 1878 – 1964), who performed as a vaudeville dancer under the name Saharet. Their daughter Carrie was born later in 1896, in New York.

Rose worked as a theatrical agent, for his wife and also for other clients including Harry Houdini, Ruth St. Denis, the Hilton Sisters, and Chung Ling Soo. He became known for booking American artists onto European stages, and vice versa. He also led a cowboy-themed troupe, Ike Rose's Historical Wild West Show, which toured Australia in the early 1910s.

He and Saharet divorced in 1912, and he married Carla Richmann (1891 – 1983) in London the following year. Soon afterwards, while in Europe and following the example of Leo Singer, he formed a group of performing "midgets", as people of unusually short stature were then generally known. Most of the performers were from Germany. By 1922, the troupe were performing regularly on vaudeville stages in the United States, and added American members to their numbers. They also included a woman from Java, purportedly of royal blood, and acquired the name "Rose's Royal Midgets" though the troupe was often also billed under other names such as "Rose's Parisian Midget Revue". The number of performers varied over the years, from about nine up to 35, and averaging over 20. They were billed as "The Greatest Organization of Miniature Men and Women Ever Gathered from the Far Corners of the World.. Atoms of Humanity... Giants of Ability". Their act included acrobatics, dancing, juggling, music, and magic tricks, and audiences and critics were generally impressed by the spectacle.

Ike Rose died in San Diego, California, in 1935. His wife Carla, often credited as Mrs. Ike Rose, continued to manage the troupe, who performed mainly at fairs, carnivals and circuses. The act continued performing until the late 1950s.
