= Ishak (name) =

Isak
- Pronunciation: Arabic: [ʔɪs.ħaːq]
- Gender: Male
- Language: Arabic

Origin
- Meaning: One who laughs
- Region of origin: Middle East

Other names
- Alternative spelling: Eshaq, Ishaak, Ishaaq, Ishaq, Isaque
- Variant form: Isaac

Ishak, Ishaq, or Eshaq (Arabic: إسحاق, romanized: ’Isḥāq; Arabic pronunciation: [ʔɪs.ħaːq]) is a masculine given name (first name), the Arabic form of Isaac. Ishak (Isaac) was the son of Ibrahim (Abraham) and Sarah, patriarchs in the Bible and the Quran. The name Ishak means 'One who laughs' because Sarah laughed when the angel told them that they would have a child (since she was very old).

== People with this given name ==
- Sheikh Ishaaq bin Ahmed, an Sharif Islamic scholar and was the forefather and common ancestor of the Isaaq tribe in the Horn of Africa
- Ishak Efendi (1774–1835), Ottoman engineer and translator
- Ishaq Darwish (1896–1974), Palestinian politician
- Ishak Haji Muhammad (1909–1991), Malaysian writer
- Ishaq Bux (1917–2000), Indian actor
- İshak Alaton (1927–2016), Turkish businessman
- Ishaq Shahryar (1936–2009), Afghan politician
- Ishak Haleva (1940–2025), Turkish Chief Rabbi
- Ishaq Dar (born 1950), Pakistani politician
- Eshaq Jahangiri (born 1957), Iranian politician
- Ishak Ali Moussa (born 1970), Algerian footballer
- Ishak Belfodil (born 1992), Algerian footballer
- Isack Hadjar (born 2004), French and Algerian racing driver

Early Islamic era

- Ishaq ibn Sulayman al-Hashimi, was the Abbasid governor and official.
- Ishaq al-Mawsili, (767–850) was an Arab musician of Persian origin
- Ishaq ibn al-Abbas ibn Muhammad al-Hashimi, Abbasid governor of Yemen.
- Ishaq ibn Rahwayh, (778–852) was an early Islamic scholar.
- Ishaq Ibn Imran, (died 903) was an Arab physician during Abbasid era.
- Ishaq Al-Ruhawi 9th-century Arab physician and the author of the medical ethics book in Arabic medicine.
- Ishaq ibn Ibrahim, (died July 850) was the chief of security (Shurtah) in Baghdad during the Abbasid era.
- Ishaq ibn Kundaj (died 891), Abbasid general and governor
- Ishaq ibn al-Muqtadir, (died 988) was an Abbasid prince and father of caliph Al-Qadir (r. 991–1031)

== People with this surname ==
Early Islamic era

- Ibn Abi Ishaq (died 735), first grammarian of the Arabic language
- Ibn Ishaq (or Muḥammad ibn Isḥāq ibn Yasār ibn Khiyār) (704–767), Arab Muslim historian who wrote a biography of Muhammad
- Muhammad ibn Ishaq, (850–851) was the chief of security (Shurtah) in Baghdad during Abbasid era.
- Hunayn ibn Ishaq, (809–873) was Nestorian Christian translator, scholar, physician, and scientist. During the Islamic Abbasid era, he worked with a group of translators.
- Baba Ishak (died 1241), 13th century Turkish rebel and false Prophet.

Modern times

- Awang Faroek Ishak (1948–2024), Indonesian politician, eleventh governor of East Kalimantan (2008–2018)
- Aziz Ishak (1915–1999), Malaysian freedom fighter, politician and journalist
- Mikael Ishak (born 1993), Swedish footballer
- Mustapha Ishak Boushaki (born 1967), Algerian cosmologist
- Mohammad Ishaq (born 1963), Pakistani cricketer
- Samar Ishaq (born 1986), Pakistani footballer
- Sara Ishaq (born 1982), a Scottish-Yemeni film maker
- Shahril Ishak (born 1984), Singaporean footballer
- Yahya Al-e Eshaq (born 1949), Iranian politician
- Yusof bin Ishak (1910–1970), Singaporean politician
- Zunera Ishaq (born 1986), Canadian woman in niqab controversy

== See also ==
- Isaac, in Judaism and Christianity
  - Isaac in Islam (Prophet Ishaq)
- Ishak (disambiguation)
