= Saint Isaac =

Saint Isaac may refer to:

== People ==
- Isaac, son of Abraham in the Old Testament
- Isaac of Dafra, Coptic saint
- Isaac of Dalmatia (died 383), confessor
- Isaac of Armenia (died c. 438), Catholicos of Armenia
- Isaac (died c. 450), of the holy fathers slain at Sinai and Raithu
- Isaac of Monteluco (died c. 550), also known as Isaac of Spoleto
- Isaac the Syrian (6th or 7th century), also known as Isaac of Nineveh
- Isaac of Córdoba (died 851), of the Martyrs of Córdoba
- Isaac the Good (died 880), bishop of Langres and canonist
- Isaac Jogues (1607–1646)
- Isaac I of Optina (1810–1894)
- Isaac II of Optina (1865–1938)

== Buildings, structures, and places ==
- Saint Isaac's Cathedral, in Saint Petersburg, Russia
- Saint Isaac's Square, in Saint Petersburg, Russia
- Saint Isaac's Bridge, the first bridge across Neva river in Saint Petersburg, Russia
