= Abraham Yizhaki =

Talmudic scholar and dayyan

- אברהם יצחקי
- Born: 16th century Salonica, Ottoman Empire
- Died: Unknown
- Occupations: Talmudic scholar; Dayyan (rabbinic judge)
- Known for: Author of Aḥot Ketannah; cited in works by Joseph Almosnino and Hasdai Peraḥya

Abraham Yizhaki (Hebrew: אברהם יצחקי, romanized: Avraham Yitsḥaki) was a Talmudic scholar and dayyan who lived in Salonica toward the end of the sixteenth century.

He was the author the four-part work Aḥot Ḳeṭannah on the laws of gets involving minors, printed at the end of Jacob Ḥagiz's Halakot Ḳeṭannot. The work is quoted in Joseph Almosnino's 'Edut bi-Yehosef (i., No. 54) and in Ḥasdai Peraḥya's Torat Ḥesed (No. 65).
