= Ike Tate =

English footballer

Personal information
- Full name: Isaac Holliday Tate
- Date of birth: 28 July 1906
- Place of birth: Gateshead, England
- Date of death: 1986 (aged 79−80)
- Place of death: Doncaster, England
- Position: Goalkeeper

Senior career*
Years	Team	Apps	(Gls)
1924−1927	Newcastle United	4	(0)
1927−1929	West Ham United	14	(0)
1929−1935	Doncaster Rovers	127	(0)
- * Club domestic league appearances and goals

Isaac Holliday Tate (28 July 1906 − 1986), born in Gateshead, was an English footballer who played as a goalkeeper for Newcastle United, West Ham United and Doncaster Rovers between 1924 and 1935. His debut made him the youngest ever keeper to play in the Football League.

== Playing career ==
Signed from local non-League football, at 18 years and 52 days, Tate became the youngest goalkeeper, to have played in the Football League when he made his debut against West Ham on 17 September 1924. His last of 4 appearances for Newcastle was in February 1925, though he remained there for two more seasons.

He moved to West Ham on a free transfer in 1927 as understudy to Ted Hufton. Making his debut against Bolton Wanderers on 10 December 1927, he went on to make a run of 7 appearances. His next spell came in September and then he played 4 games in March 1929, his last game played on 13 March at Anfield against Liverpool. In total he played in 14 games over two seasons.

His quest for first team football took him to Doncaster Rovers for the start of the 1929−30 season. He played with Doncaster till 1935 making a total of 135 league and cup appearances with them before going on to be a coach there.

He died in Doncaster in 1986.

== Honours ==
Doncaster Rovers

- Third Division North

Champions 1934–35
