= Bryan Isaac =

Bryan Isaac is a professional ballroom dancer, who teaches standard and Latin American dance in Bristol, alongside Diane Barron. In his younger days he was West of England ballroom champion with Gay Biffen, and took part in international competitions representing Great Britain.

Isaac is a Fellow and Examiner, and a committee member since 1983, of the British Association of Teachers of Dance. From 1995 to 1996 he was their president. He has also been elected as a Trustee of the Association. With Diane Barron, he is a teacher of the Bristol University Latin American & Ballroom Dancing Society.

== Publications ==
- Isaac, Bryan 1992. The British Association of Teachers of Dancing: a brief review of one hundred years. BATD.
