= Ike Uzoma =

Nigerian footballer (born 1978)

Personal information
- Date of birth: 5 February 1978 (age 48)
- Place of birth: Lagos, Nigeria
- Height: 1.79 m (5 ft 10 in)
- Position: Forward

Senior career*
Years	Team	Apps	(Gls)
1996–1998	Sunshine Stars		
1999–2000	Huracán Buceo		
2000–2001	Cruz Azul Hidalgo		
2001	Rangers de Talca		
2002	Santiago Morning		
2002	Al Mokawloon Al Arab		
2004–2005	Ismaily SC		
2005–2007	Al-Salmiya SC		
- * Club domestic league appearances and goals

Ike Uzoma (born 5 February 1978) is a Nigerian former professional footballer who played as a forward for clubs of Nigeria, Uruguay, Mexico, Chile, Egypt and Kuwait.
