= Ike Bird =

English footballer

Personal information
- Full name: Isaac Bird
- Date of birth: 14 August 1895
- Place of birth: Kimberley, Nottinghamshire, England
- Date of death: 22 June 1984 (aged 88)
- Position: Inside left

Senior career*
Years	Team	Apps	(Gls)
–	Ilkeston United		
1919–1921	Lincoln City	8	(2)
1921–1922	Ilkeston United		(11)
- * Club domestic league appearances and goals

Isaac "Ike" Bird (14 August 1895 – 22 June 1984) was an English footballer who made eight appearances in the Football League playing for Lincoln City as an inside left. He also played for Lincoln in the Midland League, and for Ilkeston United in the Central Alliance.
