= Yitzhak Mastai =

Israeli chemist (born 1966)

- יצחק מסתאי
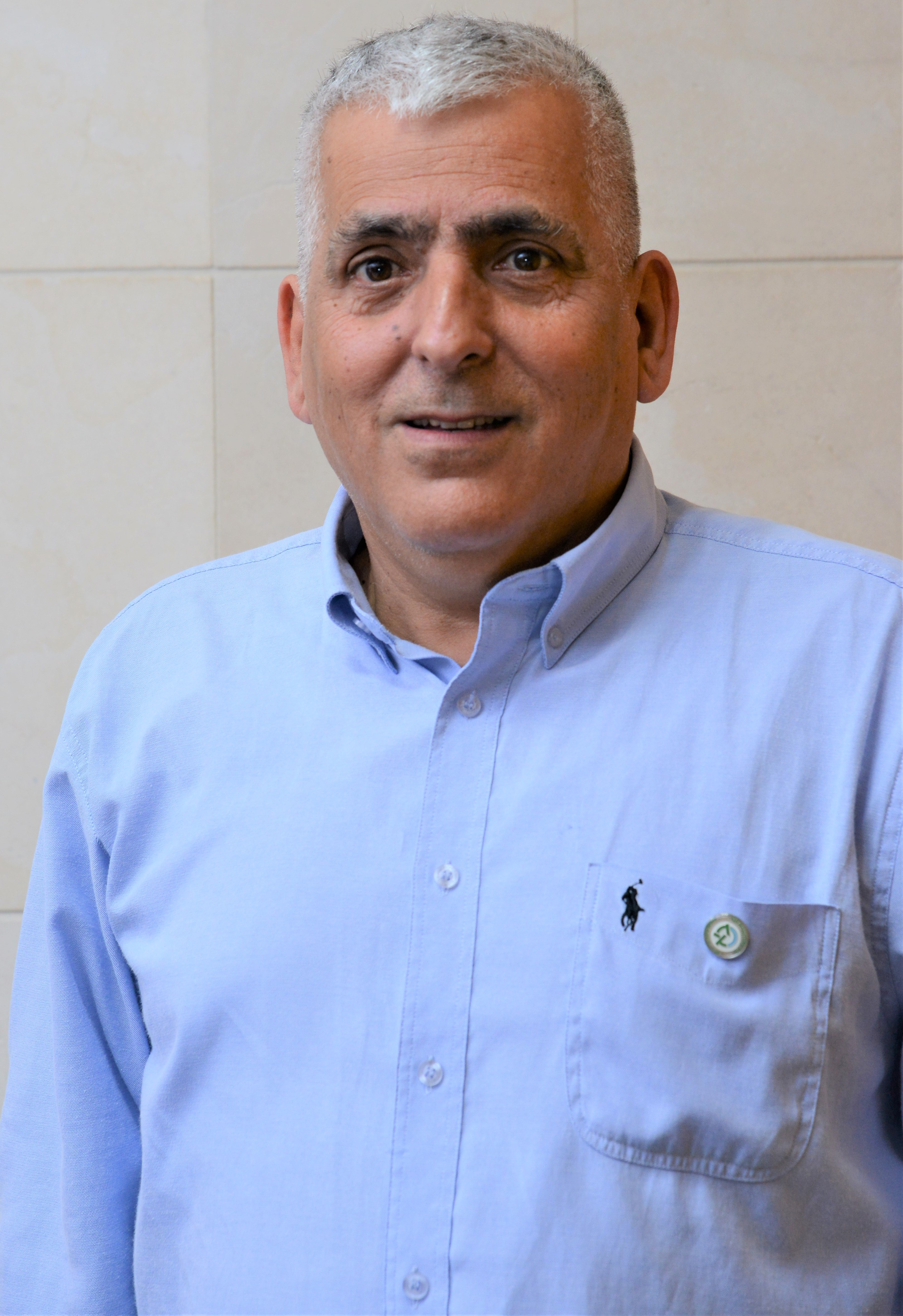
- Prof. Yitzhak Mastai, Bar-Ilan University
- Born: August 25, 1966 (age 60); Tel Aviv, Israel
- Citizenship: Israeli
- Education: Bar Ilan University; Weizmann Institute of Science
- Known for: Chirality at the nanoscale
- Scientific career
- Fields: Chemistry, nanomaterials
- Workplaces: Bar-Ilan University
- Doctoral advisor: Gary Hodes
- Other academic advisors: Markus Antonietti; Helmut Cölfen

Yitzhak Mastai (Hebrew: יצחק מסתאי) is a chemistry professor at Bar Ilan University, specializing in chirality at the nanoscale and in nanotechnology.

== Biography ==
Mastai was born in 1966 in Tel Aviv-Yafo. He obtained his B.Sc. in physical chemistry from Bar-Ilan University in 1989, and in 1999, received his PhD from the Weizmann Institute of Science under the supervision of Prof. Gary Hodes on Nanomaterial Synthesis. He then spent three years as a post-doctoral Fellow at the Max Planck Institute of Colloids and Interfaces, working with both Prof. Markus Antonietti and Prof. Helmut Cölfen on Biomimetic Chemistry and Chiral Polymers. In 2003 he joined the staff of the Chemistry Department at Bar Ilan, where he currently holds the position of a Professor of Nanotechnology and Chemistry, leading the Chirality Nanoscale laboratory.

Mastai is married to Dina von Schwarze-Mastai, a senior clinical psychologist and a distinguished translator of German-Hebrew poetry. Dina and Yitzhak have three children.

== Scientific interests and publications ==
Mastai's earlier interests included nanomaterial synthesis especially Sono (electro), the Chemical Synthesis of Semiconductors and Fullerene-like Nanoparticles, and Nanomaterial characterization. His current research focuses on Nanoscale Chirality, Synthesis and Analysis of Chiral Nanosurfaces, Chiral self-assembled Monolayers (SAM), and Polymeric Chiral Nanoparticles. Mastai and his colleagues, have gained international reputation in these fields, and have pioneered several new concepts and techniques in the following areas: (1) SAM's for the preparation of Chiral Nanosurfaces for Chiral resolution by crystallization. (2) Chiral ordered Mesoporous silica by Chiral polymer -Templated Synthesis. (3) An innovative new Carbon Chiral Mesoporous, based on the Carbonization of Chiral Ionic liquids. (4) The development of Optical Scanning Microscopy (NSOM). (5) Isothermal Titration Calorimetry (ITC) for the determination of Nanoscale Chirality.

He has over 200 peer-reviewed articles in print, which were cited nearly 9,000 times. Mastai has published many book chapters and edited 3 books on various aspects of nanomaterials and materials science.

Among his previous awards were the Minerva Postdoctoral Fellowship which he received in 2000 and the Yigal Alon fellowship in 2003, for outstanding young researchers of the Israel Academy for higher education. Prof. Mastai served as Chairman of the Chemistry Department at Bar-Ilan University, between 2014 and 2017. He also served as an executive board member of the Israel Chemical Society (ICS), The Israel Vacuum Society (IVS), the editorial board of the Journal of Nanomaterials and the Israel Journal of Chemistry (IJC).
