= Isaac Inoke Tosika =

Solomon Islands politician (born 1964)

Isaac Inoke Tosika (born October 10, 1964) is a member of the National Parliament of the Solomon Islands. He represents a constituency in Malaita Province, and was first elected in 2006.

== See also ==
- Politics of Solomon Islands
