= Ike Bassindale =

English footballer (1896–1985)

Personal information
- Full name: Isaac Bradley Bassindale
- Date of birth: 26 January 1896
- Place of birth: Harrington, England
- Date of death: 1985 (aged 88–89)
- Position: Wing-half

Senior career*
Years	Team	Apps	(Gls)
1912–1919	Loftus Albion		
1920–1921	Hartlepools United		
1921–1926	Oldham Athletic	50	(0)
1926	Mossley		
1927	Ashton National		
Total		50	(0)
- * Club domestic league appearances and goals

Isaac Bradley Bassindale (26 January 1896 – 1985) was an English footballer who played in the Football League for Oldham Athletic.
