= Ike Bikitsha =

South African politician (1935–2015)

Member of the National Assembly
- In office May 1994 – June 1999

Personal details
- Born: Pule Isaac Bikitsha; 22 August 1935 (age 90)
- Died: 28 June 2015 (aged 79) De Deur, Gauteng; Republic of South Africa
- Citizenship: South Africa
- Party: Inkatha Freedom Party

Pule Isaac "Ike" Bikitsha (22 August 1935 – 28 June 2015) was a South African politician and businessman. He represented the National Party (NP) in the National Assembly from 1994 to 1999.

== Life and career ==
Bikitsha was born on 22 August 1935. He was elected to the National Assembly in South Africa's first post-apartheid elections in 1994. Although he stood for re-election in 1999, he was ranked 46th on the NP's regional party list for Gauteng and therefore failed to gain re-election. He worked as a businessman until his death on 18 June 2015 at his workplace in De Deur in Gauteng's Vaal Triangle.
