= Isaac ben Eliezer =

15th-century German rabbi

Rabbi Isaac ben Eliezer
- יצחק בן אליעזר

Personal life
- Parent: Eliezer (father)

Religious life
- Religion: Judaism

Jewish leader
- Residence: Worms, Germany

Isaac ben Eliezer (Hebrew: יצחק בן אליעזר) was a German rabbi who lived in Worms from 1460 to 1480.

He attended the lectures of Moses ben Eliezer ha-Darshan (Leopold Zunz, "Zur Geschichte und Literatur" p. 105), whom he praised in high terms.

== Sefer HaGan ==
Isaac wrote in German an ethical and ascetic treatise under the title "Sefer HaGan" (Kraków, about 1580). It is divided into seven parts, one for each day of the week. Translated into Hebrew by Moses Saertels, it was subsequently printed, together with Johanan Luria's "Sefer ha-Derakah," in Prague (1597, 1612) and Amsterdam (1663, 1713). The Hebrew translation has been twice rendered into German ("Das Hochgelobte Sefer ha-Gan," Hanau, about 1620; "Das Ist der Teutsch Sefer ha-Gan," Fürth, 1692).
