= Mihaiela Isac =

Romanian and Canadian metallurgist

Mihaiela Minea Isac is a Romanian and Canadian metallurgist whose research publications focus on the physical properties of steel and aluminum and on their production processes. She is affiliated with the McGill Metals Processing Centre at McGill University.

== Education and career ==
Isac has master's and doctoral degrees from Politehnica University of Bucharest. After postdoctoral research at the Delft University of Technology, she was a professor of metallurgy at the Politehnica University of Bucharest from 1986 to 2004. She has been affiliated with McGill University since 1995, including being associate director of the McGill Metals Processing Centre, and as president and CEO of MetSim Inc.

She has also chaired the Light Metals Section of The Metallurgy and Materials Society (MetSoc), one of the constituent societies of the Canadian Institute of Mining, Metallurgy and Petroleum.

== Recognition ==
Isac is a Fellow of the Canadian Institute of Mining, Metallurgy and Petroleum, and a Fellow of the Canadian Academy of Engineering, elected in 2023.

In 2010, Isac and Roderick Guthrie of the McGill Metals Processing Centre were the co-recipients of the NSERC Leo Derikx Award, "for their contributions to global advances in liquid and solid metal processing". Isac is the 2022 recipient of the MetSoc Research Excellence Award, and of the MetSoc Silver Medal Award.
