= Ike Thomas (baseball) =

American baseball player (fl. 1930s)

- Second baseman

Negro league baseball debut
- 1932, for the Indianapolis ABCs

Last appearance
- 1932, for the Indianapolis ABCs
- Stats at Baseball Reference

Teams
- Indianapolis ABCs (1932)

Ike Thomas is an American former Negro league second baseman who played in the 1930s.

Thomas played for the Indianapolis ABCs in 1932. In 28 recorded games, he posted 27 hits and five RBI in 108 plate appearances.
