= Ike Sellers =

Australian rules footballer (1905–1997)

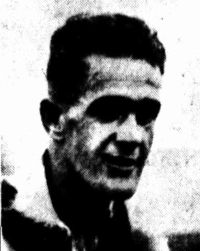

Personal information
- Full name: Theodore Quentin Sellers
- Born: 17 July 1905; Scottsdale, Tasmania
- Died: 12 October 1997 (aged 92)
- Original team: Cananore / Scottsdale

Playing career^{1}
Years	Club	Games (Goals)
1931	Coburg (VFA)	8 (13)
1932	Melbourne	2 (0)
- ^{1} Playing statistics correct to the end of 1932.

Theodore Quentin 'Ike' Sellers (17 July 1905 – 12 October 1997) was an Australian rules footballer who played with Melbourne in the Victorian Football League (VFL).

== Football ==
=== Carlton (VFL) ===
Sellers was from Tasmania, and was given a clearance to Carlton on 2 May 1930: but only ever played for their reserves.

=== Hawthorn (VFL) ===
He subsequently transferred to Hawthorn but again could not manage a senior game.

=== Coburg (VFA) ===
He was cleared from Hawthorn to Coburg in the VFA on 10 June 1931.

=== Melbourne (VFL) ===
Sellers eventually made his league debut for Melbourne in 1932, but only played two senior games before breaking a bone in his leg.
