= Ike Motloung =

South African lawyer

- Born: Isaac Mobuti Mohloki Motloung; East Rand, South Africa
- Education: Bachelor of Laws
- Alma mater: University of the North (now University of Limpopo)
- Occupations: Attorney, Acting Judge
- Years active: 1991-present
- Known for: High-profile cases, Acting Judge in the High Court of South Africa

Isaac Mobuti Mohloki Motloung, known as Ike Motloung, is a South African lawyer.

Motloung graduated with a Bachelor of Laws degree at the University of the North (now University of Limpopo) in 1986 and began practical training as a paralegal at Katlehong Legal Services Centre (affiliate of the Democratic Lawyers Congress), providing free public-interest legal aid across.

Admitted as an attorney in April 1991, Motloung began his legal career as a sole practitioner, establishing the Ike Motloung Attorneys law firm, which he managed from 1991 to 1996. In 1997, he entered into a legal partnership that merged several prominent firms to form Makume and Associates, where he practiced until 2003. In 2004, the law firm merged with four leading black law firms to establish the Maluleke Seriti Makume Matlala Inc. (MSMM Inc.), where he serves as one of the directors.

Motloung currently serves as one of the three directors at the firm's Germiston branch, Gauteng. His legal practice spans multiple areas, including criminal and civil litigation, employment and labour law, administrative and constitutional law, contract law and procurement law. His distinguished career as a defense attorney has seen him represent prominent clients in high-profile cases, earning him national recognition.

He occasionally served as an acting judge in the High Court of South Africa between 2008 and 2014. During these periods, he presided over various cases, including criminal and civil appeals, civil trials, unopposed divorces and motion roll hearings. He continued to serve as an acting judge during a six-month term in 2010 and again in the Free State High Court in 2014.

Throughout his career, Motloung has represented several high-profile clients, including Jacob Zuma during his tenure as South African deputy president, Dan Mofokeng in 1996 who was acquitted after being charged when an AK-47 rifle was found in his home, former crime intelligence boss Richard Mdluli, musician Jub Jub, his mother Jacqui Maarohanye and former Orlando Pirates footballer Benedict Vilakazi.

In 2011, Motloung was shortlisted for a permanent judicial appointment and interviewed by the Judicial Service Commission (JSC) for vacancies at the North Gauteng and South Gauteng High Courts. Although he was not appointed, his extensive experience as an acting judge positioned him as a respected figure in the South African legal community.

In 2015, Motloung was summoned to testify in a perjury investigation involving senior National Prosecuting Authority (NPA) officials. He expressed concerns about setting a bad legal precedent by testifying against fellow legal professionals. After failing to appear in court twice, a warrant for his arrest was issued and Motloung protested it. He indicated plans to seek legal advice and possibly challenge the summons. He accused the Pretoria magistrate of using "apartheid tactics" in expecting him to testify against his legal colleagues.

In 2018, Motloung faced a personal legal matter when he was taken to the Johannesburg Family Court over allegations of failing to pay school fees for his 17-year-old daughter. The case highlighted challenges in balancing personal responsibilities with professional obligations.

In March 2020, during sentencing proceedings for Richard Mdluli, who was convicted of assault and kidnapping, Motloung argued that a fine would be a more appropriate punishment than imprisonment. He emphasized Mdluli's service to the community as an experienced policeman and status as a first-time offender. Motloung quit as Mdluli's lawyer in 2024, citing non-payment by Mdluli and which resulted in Mdluli losing an appeal application with the state.
