= Ike Oguine =

Nigerian writer and lawyer

- Citizenship: Nigeria
- Occupations: Writer; Lawyer; Pundit

Ike Oguine (born 20th century) is a Nigerian writer and lawyer.

He has been described as part of the third generation of Nigerian literature.

== Career ==
As a commentator, Oquine has written several opinion pieces for the New Internationalist, West Africa, and The Times Literary Supplement, and has written several short stories.

His debut novel, A Squatter's Tale, was first published in 1997 and later republished as part of the Heinemann African Writers Series in 2000.

Oguine's professional career is as a lawyer. First, he worked for Chevron Corporation as the lead counsel on the West African Gas Pipeline, the Escravos GTL, the Brass LNG Project and the ONLNG project. From April 2014 to May 2015, he served as general counsel to the Nigerian National Petroleum Corporation (NNPC Limited), under an appointment made by Nigerian president Goodluck Jonathan.
