= Ike Wales =

Australian cricketer

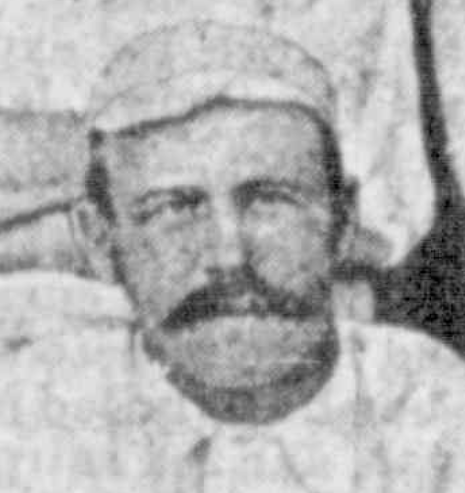

Personal information
- Full name: Isaac F Wales
- Born: 31 January 1865; Durham, Australia
- Died: 11 January 1949 (aged 83)
- Role: Wicket-keeper

Domestic team information
- Years: Team
- 1886 – 1894: New South Wales
- Source: ESPNcricinfo, 15 December 2015

Isaac F Wales (31 January 1865 – 11 January 1949) was an Australian cricketer. Primarily a wicket-keeper, he played 16 first-class cricket matches for New South Wales between 1886 and 1894, taking 28 catches, stumping 5 batsmen and scoring 121 runs.

== See also ==
- List of New South Wales representative cricketers
