= Ike =

Ike or IKE may refer to:

== People and fictional characters ==
- Ike (given name), a list of people and fictional characters with the given name or nickname
- Ike (surname), a list of people
- Dwight D. Eisenhower (1890–1969), Supreme Commander of the Allied forces in Europe during World War II and President of the United States
- Reverend Ike, American minister and television evangelist Frederick J. Eikerenkoetter II (1935–2009)
- Cliff Edwards (1895–1971), American singer and voice actor known as "Ukulele Ike"

== Arts and entertainment ==
- Ike (miniseries), a 1979 television miniseries about President Dwight D. Eisenhower
- Ike: Countdown to D-Day, a 2004 American television film
- Ike, a fictional moon in the game Kerbal Space Program

== Other uses ==
- Tropical Storm Ike, three tropical cyclones
- Internet Key Exchange, a network protocol used by IPsec VPNs
- Ike, Texas, an unincorporated community in the US
- USS Dwight D. Eisenhower, US Navy aircraft carrier nickname "the Ike"
- Dwight D. Eisenhower Expressway, part of Interstate 290 and nicknamed "the Ike"
- Inuktitut (ISO 639-3 code: ike), an Inuit language of Canada
- Ikerasak Heliport (LID airport code), Greenland
