= Ike T. Pryor =

American cattle rancher and businessman (1852–1937)

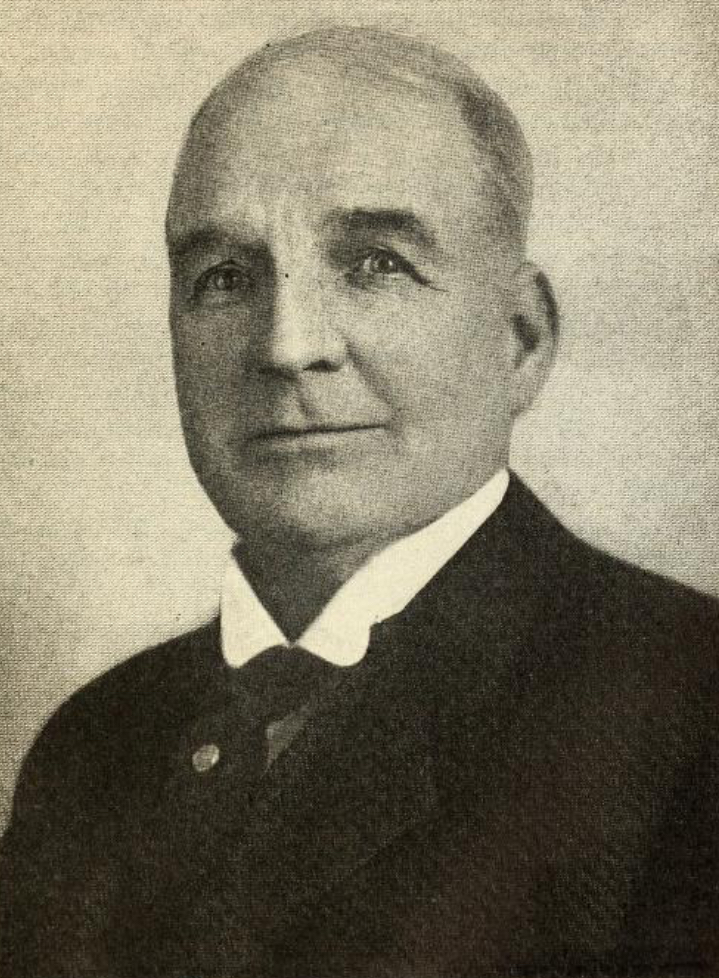
- Pryor in a 1925 publication
- Born: Isaac Thomas Pryor; June 22, 1852; Tampa, Florida, US
- Died: September 24, 1937 (aged 85); San Antonio, Texas, US
- Other names: "Colonel"
- Occupations: Cattle rancher, businessman

Isaac "Colonel" Thomas Pryor (June 22, 1852 – September 24, 1937) was an American cattle rancher and businessman. At his peak, he handled 45,000 head of cattle per year. He was a successful stockbroker and held executive positions in several companies.

== Biography ==
Pryor was born on June 22, 1852, in Tampa, Florida, the youngest of three children of David Christopher and Emma Almira Pryor (née McKissack). He lived with extended family, as his parents both died when he was 5. He ran away at age 9, then worked as a newspaper hawker for the 3rd Ohio Cavalry Regiment. Though he never enlisted, he was present for the Battle of Chickamauga, Lookout Mountain, and Stones River.

After the war, Pryor returned to his extended family in Tennessee, later joining them in their move to Alabama. At age 18, he moved to Texas, because his brother, A. M. Pryor, spoke well about it after a returning from there. He arrived at Galveston in 1870, and moved to Austin, where he worked as a farmhand. In 1871, he drove cattle to Coffeyville, Kansas for Bill Arnold, a rancher in Llano County, becoming foreman of the drive in 1872. He left the drive in 1873 to work as a farmhand for Charles Lehmberg, becoming a foreman the same year.

In 1874, Pryor purchased the ranch – named 77 Ranch – from Lemberg, which composed of 20,000 acres. As the ranch owner, he expanded the cattle it sold. During springs and summers, cattle were driven to Kansas, and during falls and winters, they were sold to butchers in Austin. He and a brother worked as partners from 1878 to 1885, at one point driving 45,000 cattle to Kansas in one year. In 1885, they moved 20,000 cattle to Colorado to avoid the cattle market crash in Texas, though, most of their cattle were killed in the Big Die-Up, and they ended their partnership.

After the partnership ended, Pryor invested $70,000 into the Texas and Colorado Land and Cattle Company, an Indian Territory-based business. He invested with money he was given by Evans, Snider, and Buel Livestock Commission Company. Through a cattle shipment to Havana – which had then recently returned to trade following the Spanish–American War – Pryor gained a large profit. With the profit, he invested in the company which he originally borrowed from and became its vice president. He also re-established 77 Ranch, when he purchased 100,000 acres in Zavala County, Texas for $140,000, and released 10,000 cattle onto it. In 1908, founded the settlement La Pryor on his land, which he named for himself.

Beginning in the 1880s, Pryor was a successful stockbroker and an executive in multiple organizations and companies. His roles included presider of the American National Livestock Association (predecessor to the National Cattlemen's Beef Association), president of the Trans-Mississippi Commercial Congress, and founder of the City National Bank of San Antonio.

In 1878, Pryor married Sarah Helen Rapp, having three children together. Rapp later died, and he married Myra Early Pryor (née Stafford) in 1893. His land ownership included the property of the Norton-Polk-Mathis House. He died on September 24, 1937, aged 85, in San Antonio, of illness. His funeral was held on September 25, and he and his wife are buried in Mission Burial Park South.
