= Ike Schab =

American World War II veteran and Pearl Harbor survivor (1920–2025)

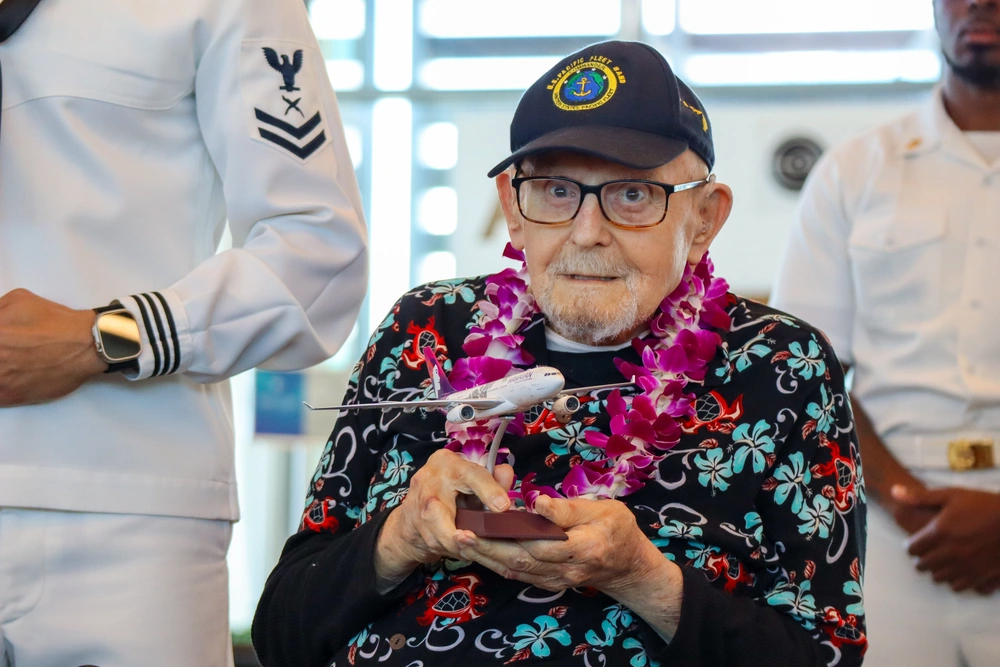
- Schab in 2024
- Born: Ira Schab; 4 July 1920; Chicago, Illinois, U.S.
- Died: 20 December 2025 (aged 105); Beaverton, Oregon, U.S.
- Occupations: U.S. Navy sailor; electrical engineer
- Known for: One of the last surviving Pearl Harbor attack veterans
- Children: 2

Ira "Ike" Schab (4 July 1920 – 20 December 2025) was an American World War II veteran and U.S. Navy sailor. He was one of the last surviving servicemen present during the Japanese attack on Pearl Harbor on 7 December 1941.

== Early life ==
Schab was born on 4 July 1920, in Chicago, Illinois, the eldest of three brothers. He joined the United States Navy at 18, following in his father's footsteps.

== World War II ==
At age 21, Schab served aboard the USS Dobbin (AD-3) as a musician and sailor. During the attack on Pearl Harbor, he helped pass ammunition to anti‑aircraft guns. His ship lost three sailors in the assault.

During the Pearl Harbor attack, Schab witnessed the capsizing of the USS Utah, later recalling that he was "startled and scared to death".

== Career ==
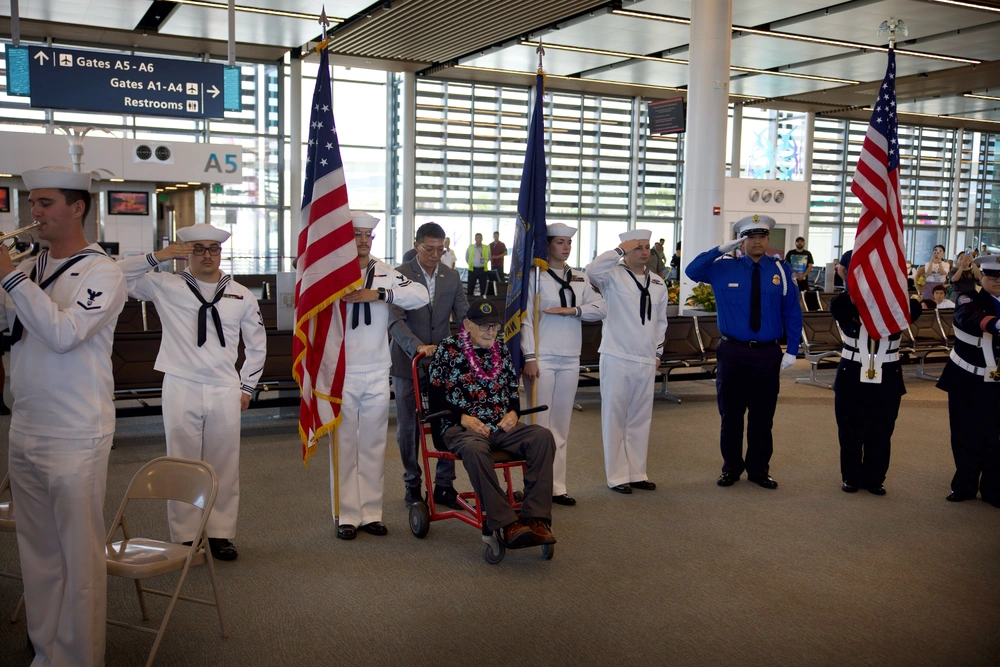
Joint Base Pearl Harbor–Hickam Honor Guard and the Transportation Security Administration Honor Guard salutes Schab

After the war, Schab studied aerospace engineering and worked as an electrical engineer for General Dynamics, contributing to the United States' Apollo space flight program. His work at General Dynamics involved supporting projects that advanced the nation's aerospace capabilities during the height of the space race.

Colleagues described him as meticulous and disciplined, qualities that reflected his Navy background and made him a valued member of engineering teams.

Beyond his technical contributions, Schab often spoke about how his wartime experiences shaped his determination to pursue a career that supported America's scientific and defense achievements.

== Death ==
Schab died at his home in Beaverton, Oregon, on 20 December 2025, with his family by his side. He was 105. In the years before his death, he continued to attend Pearl Harbor commemorations including the 83rd anniversary in December 2024 at age 104. At the time of his death, there were only about a dozen survivors of the Pearl Harbor attack still living.

== See also ==
- List of last surviving World War II veterans
- United States Navy Memorial
- World War II veterans
