= Vadul lui Isac =

- Village
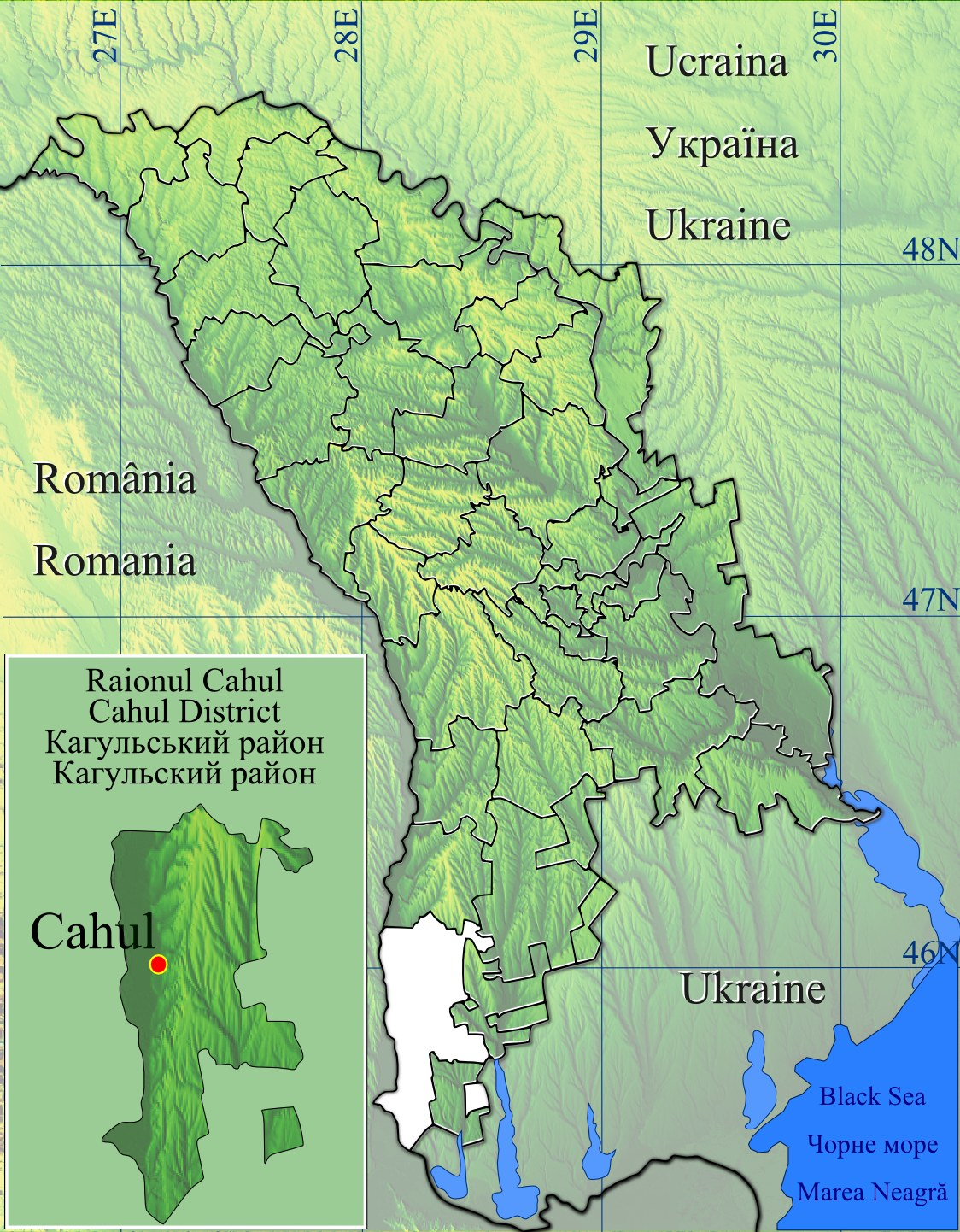
- Location of village within Moldova
- Coordinates: 45°46′N 28°10′E
- Country: Moldova
- District: Cahul District

Population (2014 census)
  - Total: 2,536
- Time zone: UTC+2 (EET)
  - Summer (DST): UTC+3 (EEST)

Vadul lui Isac is a village in Cahul District, Moldova.

The village is located at the western end of the southern Lower Trajan's Wall.
