= Mar Isaac (Firuz Shabur) =

Gaon of the Yeshiva academy of Firuz Shapur in Babylon

- מר רב יצחק גאון
- Title: Gaon

Personal life
- Era: Transition period between the Savora Jewish sages and the Geonim
- Known for: Last Dean of the Yeshiva academy in Firuz Shapur
- Other names: מר יצחק מן פרוז שבור, רב יצחק

Religious life
- Religion: Judaism

Senior posting
- Based in: Firuz Shapur, Babylonia

Mar Isaac (Hebrew: מר רב יצחק גאון, or (מר יצחק (מן פרוז שבור, or merely רב יצחק) was a Gaon of the Yeshiva academy of Firuz Shapur in Babylon, during the transition period between the Savora Jewish sages and the Geonim. The academy in Firuz Shapur functioned for several generations as a third Yeshiva academy in Babylon, in parallel to the Pumbedita and Sura Yeshiva academies. Mar Isaac was the last Dean of the Yeshiva academy in Firuz Shapur. During the times Babylon was conquered by the Muslims, Mar Isaac came with 90,000 Jews to meet the conqueror, Ali Ibn Abi Talib, and was received in a friendly manner.
