= South Africa Army cricket team =

The South Africa Army cricket team represented the British Army in South Africa, the Union of South Africa having not been formed at the time.

The team appeared only once at first-class level. In January 1906, they played the touring MCC at Thara Tswane, Pretoria, the only first-class match ever played there. MCC batted first and declared after the first day's play at 480 for 7, and South Africa Army made 97 and 165 on the second day, MCC thus winning by an innings and 218 runs. The margin might have been wider still without the efforts of Captain Philip Mitford (who was also the team's captain), playing his only first-class game: in the Army's first innings, he carried his bat for 65 not out, the only score in double figures.
