= Isaak B. Klejman =

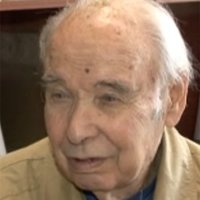
Isaak B. Klejman

Isaac Bentsionovich Kleiman (11 January 1921 – February 13, 2012), was a Ukrainian Soviet archaeologist specialist in the history of antiquity.

== Biography ==
He studied at the Leningrad Artillery School (1939–1941). Member of the Great Patriotic War. After demobilization he graduated from the Faculty of History, University of Odesa (1952).

Field of interest - Antique Archaeology, especially in the western part of the Northern Black Sea coast, the ancient city of Tyras at the mouth of the Dniester. Published about 100 scientific papers.

From 1963 to 1988 - head and deputy head of the archaeological expedition to excavate ancient and medieval Tira Belgorod. Also participated in other archaeological expeditions in the North-West Black Sea region.

He worked at the Odesa Archeological Museum, National Academy of Sciences of Ukraine, for several years headed the department of Classical Archaeology Museum.

== Books ==
The City of Tyras. A Historical and Archaeological Essay. Одесса: Polis-Press, 1994
