= Juspa Schammes =

Writer and Chronicler of the Jewish community Worms, Germany

- יוזפא שמש
- Born: February 14, 1604; Fulda, Germany
- Died: February 5, 1678 (aged 73); Worms, Holy Roman Empire
- Resting place: Jewish Cemetery, Worms
- Occupation: synagogue caretaker (shammes)
- Years active: ~1664-1678
- Era: Worms
- Known for: Minhagbuch; The Sefer Ma'aseh Nisim

Juspa Schammes (Note: Full name: Jiftach Joseph Juspa ben Naftali Herz (Hirz) Segal from the Manzpach family (as in the longest form in: Raspe: Yuzpa Shammes. p. 100); in a modern version: Jiftach Joseph Juspa, son of Naftali Herz from the Levi tribe from the Manzpach family (Eidelberg: Das Minhagbuch. p. 21). Shorter forms are also used, with the omission of individual parts of the name, as well as a number of different spellings, some of which are more based on the English-language rendering of Hebrew characters.) (Hebrew: יוזפא שמש; February 14, 1604 in Fulda – February 5, 1678 in Worms) was a chronicler of the Jewish community of Worms, Germany, synagogue caretaker (shammes), and a writer.

== Life and career ==
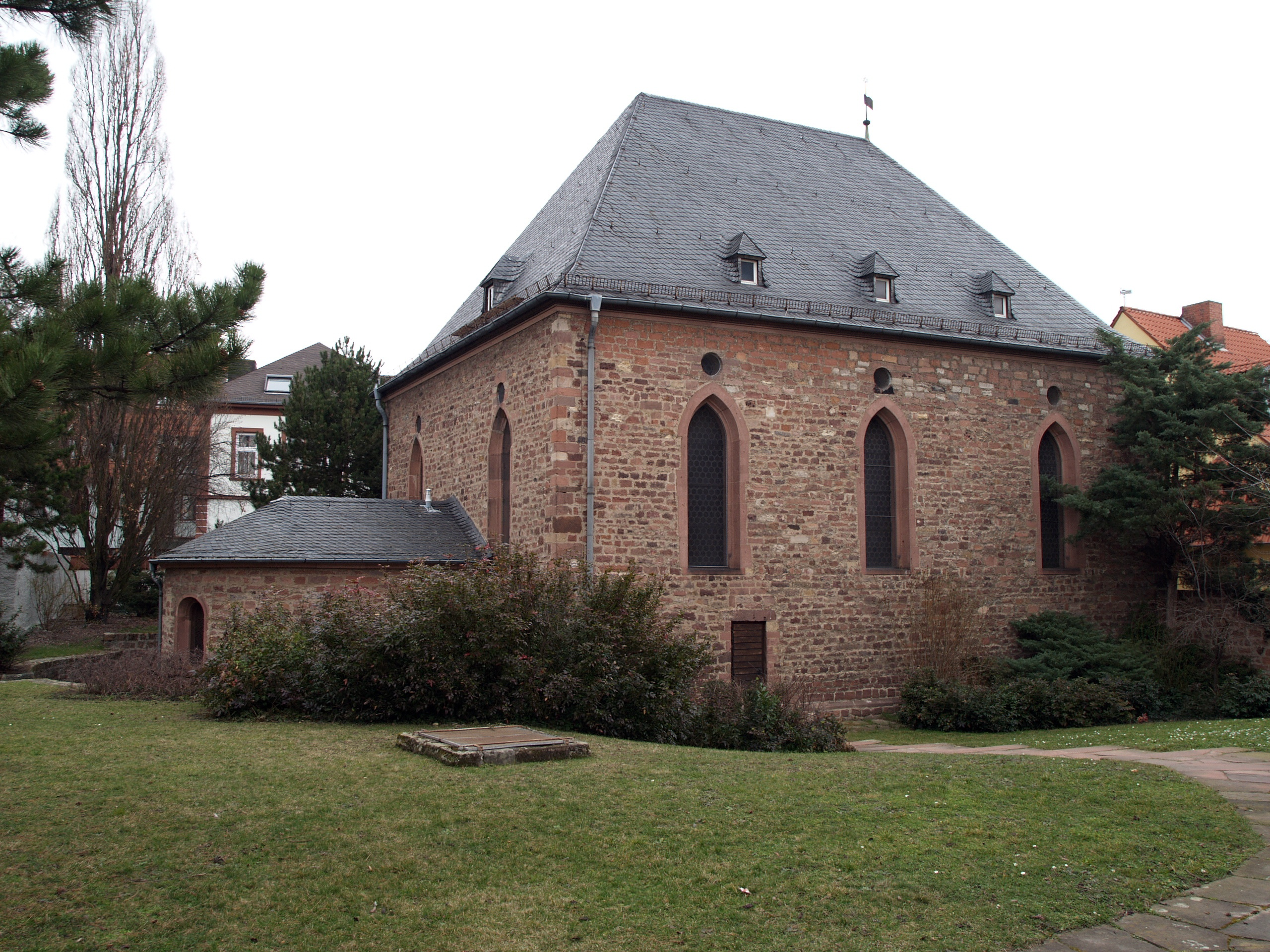
Worms Synagogue

=== Personal life ===
He was born as the son of Rabbi Juda in Fulda. In 1625 he married Breunge or Faierchen (* before 1610; † August 8, 1688), daughter of Michel and Güttle, who lived in the house "Zur hinter Sichel" in Judengasse in Worms. Juspa and his wife had five children: Elieser Liebermann (died after 1696), Jacob (died 1667), Israel Moses Sanwil (died 1699), Tamar (died 1666), Mindele (died 1723).

Juspa Schammes died in 1678, and was buried at Heiliger Sand, a Jewish Cemetery in Worms. His gravestone has not been preserved and was probably destroyed in the World War II.

=== Training and work ===
In 1620 he studied in the yeshiva in Fulda with Rabbi Pinchas Levi Hurwitz from Prague. In 1623 he came to Worms following Elia ben Mosche Loanz, called Baal Shem, to continue his studies with the well-known Kabbalist at the yeshiva there.

He performed numerous tasks in the Jewish community of Worms. He was schammes (Note: He must have taken over the office between 1642 and 1647 (Reuter / Schäfer: Wundergeschichten. p. 80).) (caretaker) of Worms Synagogue and scribe. In the latter function, he issued official documents, such as divorce letters, and was an official witness in business transactions. He made transcriptions for Rabbi Moses Simson Bacharach (1607-1670), who had been a rabbi in Worms since 1650. In addition, Juspa was probably also active as a Torah scribe and could, if necessary, slaughter animals and perform circumcisions.

He became known for his writing, that, however, didn't appear in print during his life. He collected customs, habits, music, and stories about the Jewish community of Worms. These records are today a highly valuable primary source on Judaism in Worms during the early modern period.

Murals from the Cold Synagogue, Mogilev inspired by Juspa's tales from Maase Nissim, c. 1740s<ref>Wischnitzer, Rachel (1964). "Chapter Seven. The Wooden Synagogue - Central Plan: Eastern Europe / 16th to 18th Centuries". The Architecture of the European Synagogue. Philadelphia: The Jewish Publication Society of America. p. 155. ASIN B000V2IRN4.</ref>

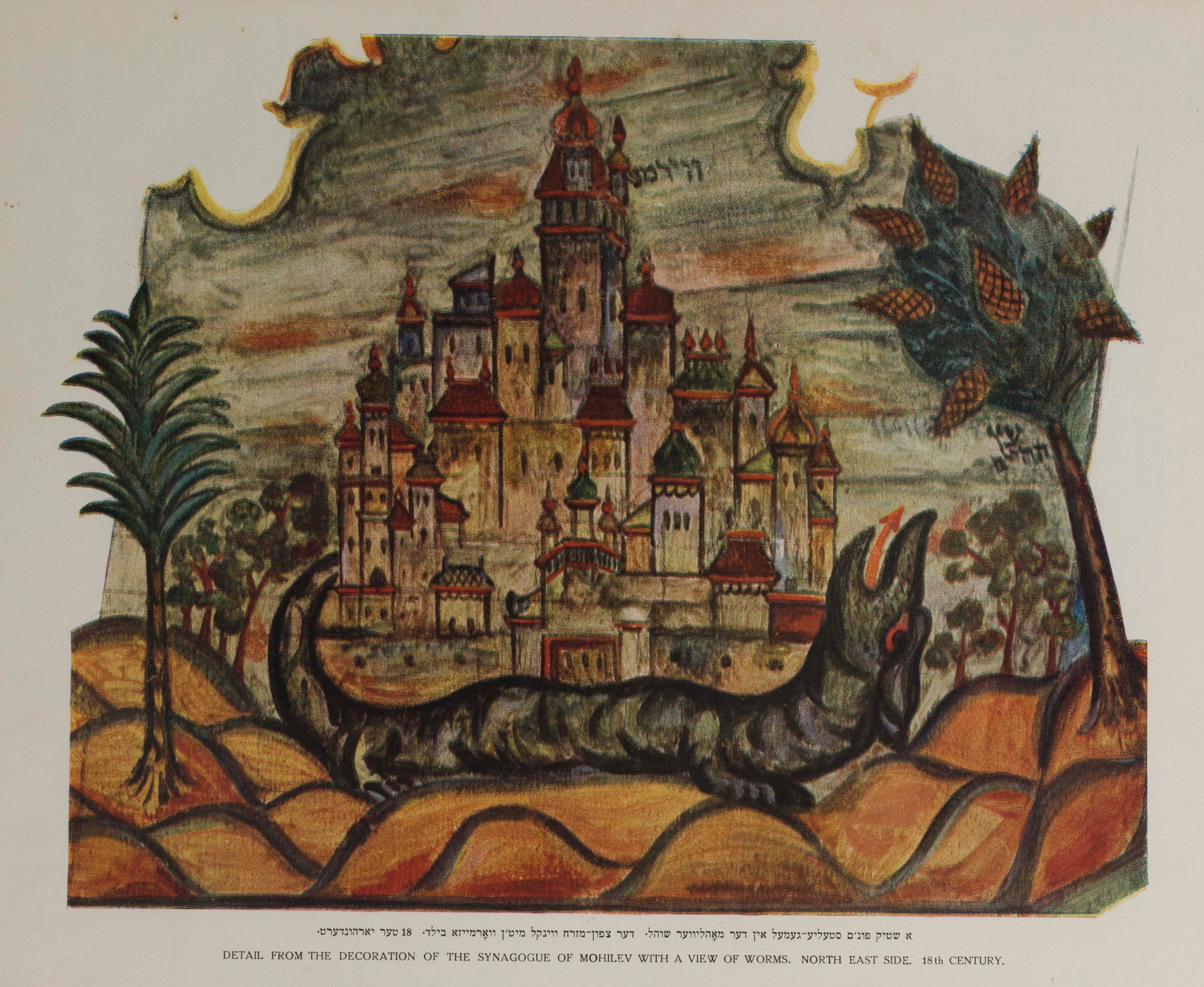

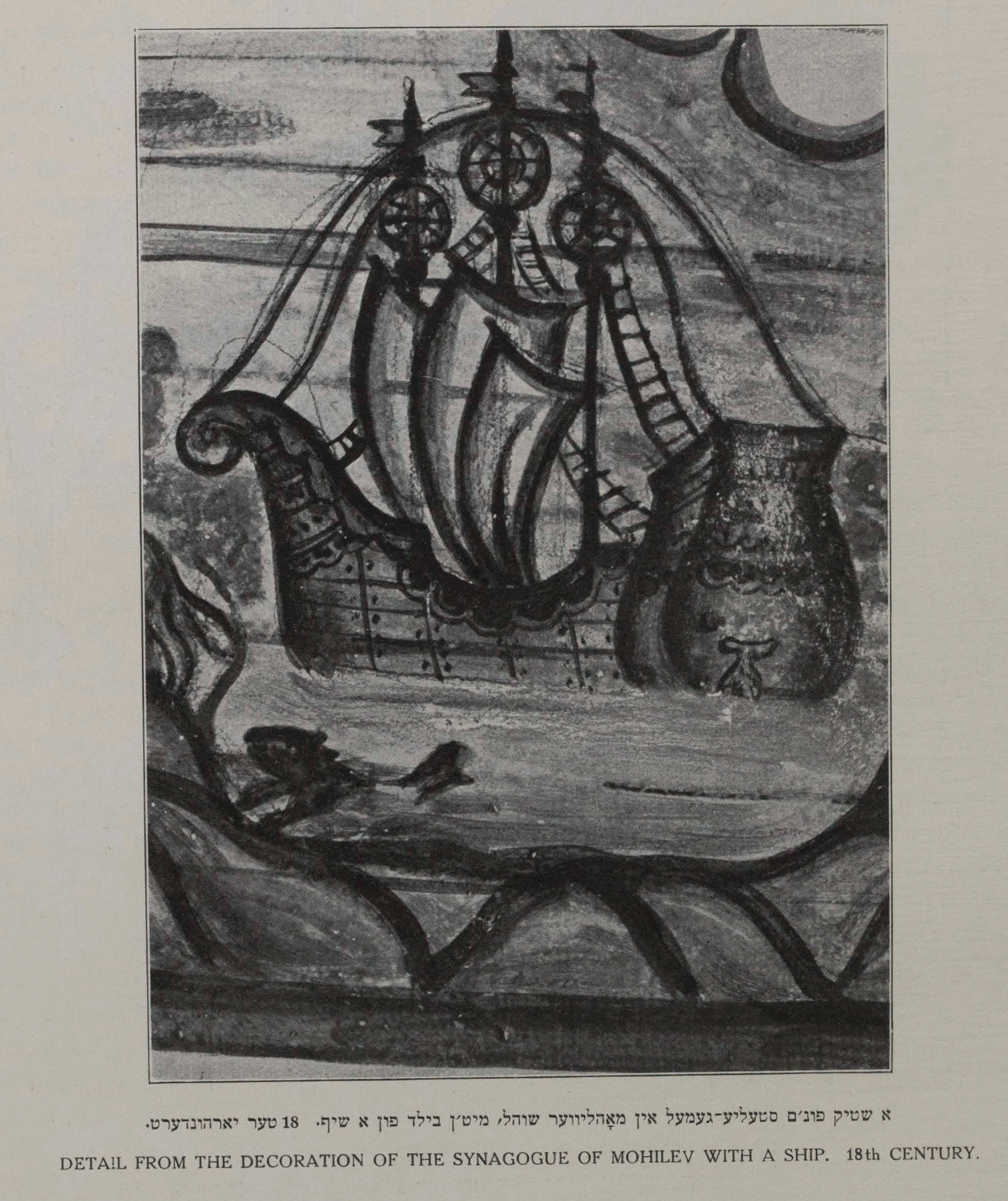

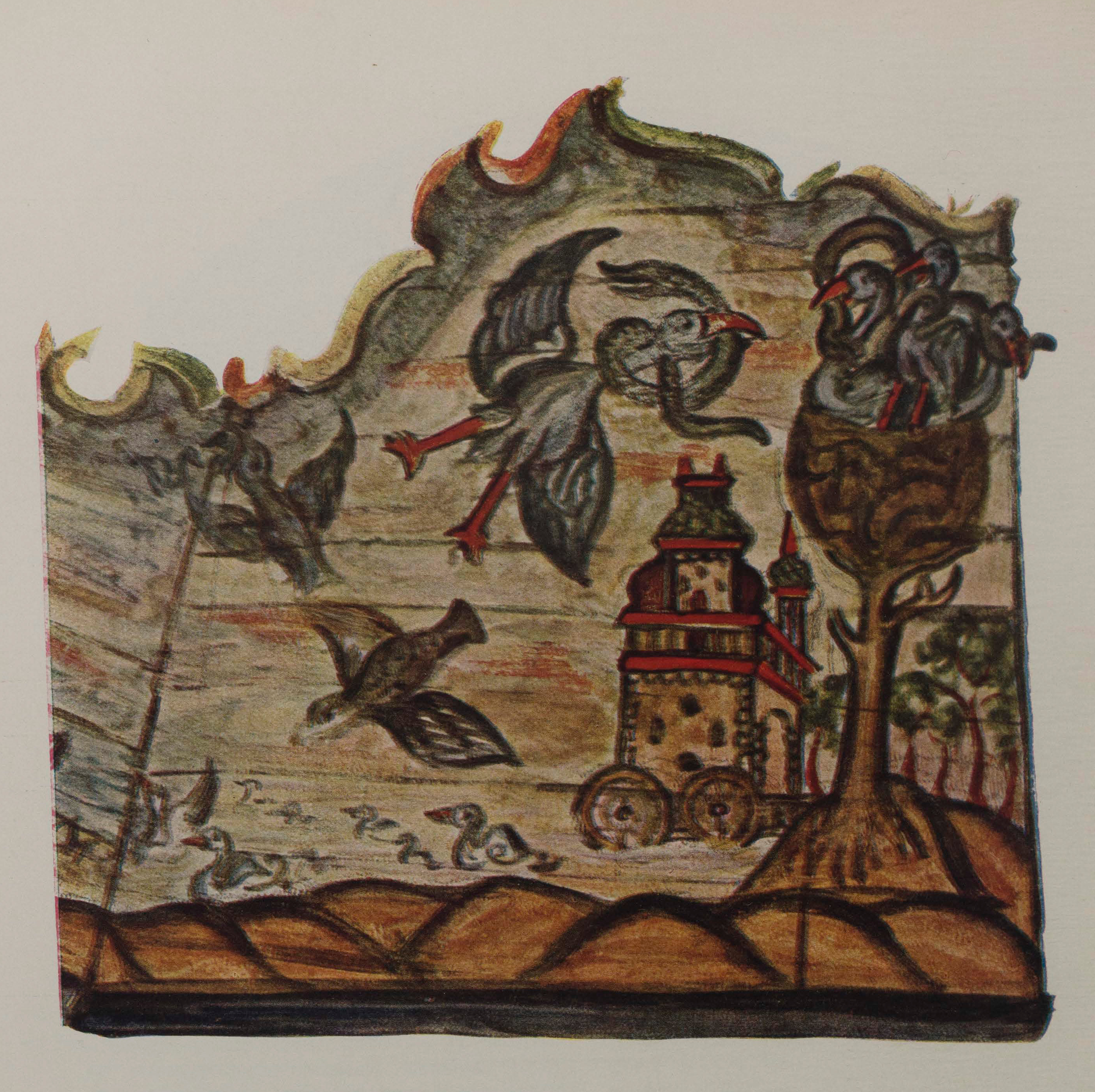

His main works are:

- The Sefer Ma'aseh Nisim, a collection of local sagas and legends published by his son Elieser Liebermann after the death of his father when he lived in exile in Amsterdam after the destruction of Worms in the Nine Years' War in 1689 by troops of Louis XIV of France. The book appeared in numerous editions in the 17th and 18th centuries. The original manuscript is not preserved, so it is unclear whether Juspa wrote the text in Hebrew or Yiddish. The printed version contains 25 stories, two of which are encores by Elieser Liebermann.
- Minhagbuch, a collection of customs of the Jewish community of Worms. It contains the local liturgical prescriptions, the customs of the annually repeated feasts and the rites of passage in the course of human life. In addition, Juspa recorded current events. Three different manuscripts are known of the Minhagbuch:
1. David Oppenheim originally owned a copy. It is now in the Bodleian Library in Oxford (Codex Oxford 909). This is reproduced as a facsimile at Eidelberg.
2. Another copy was in the possession of the Amsterdam family Lehren and was sold to A. Epstein after an auction in 1899. It was owned by a family in Jerusalem and is said to have reached the Bodleian in Oxford in the meantime in the 1980s.
3. A third copy is owned by the Mainz Jewish Community and is on loan from the Raschi-Haus Museum in Worms. It was saved because the last rabbi of Worms, Helmut Frank (Jakob bar Israel), was able to take it with him when he emigrated to the USA in 1938. In 1972 he returned it to the Mainz Jewish Community, the legal successor to the Worms Jewish Community.
- The Likkutei Yosef, a commentary on Prayer, Grace after Meals, the Passover Haggadah, and Ethics. Only one manuscript exists, today part of the Braginsky Collection in Zurich, Switzerland. The section pertaining to the Passover Haggadah was printed in 2023 by Achsanya Shel Torah.
- The Pinkas HaKehila, a directory of notarized business contracts. Authorship of Juspa Schammes is disputed. Eidelberg stated that entries from the years 1656 to 1659 are authored by Juspa.
