= Worms, Germany =

City in Rhineland-Palatinate, Germany

Worms
- Town
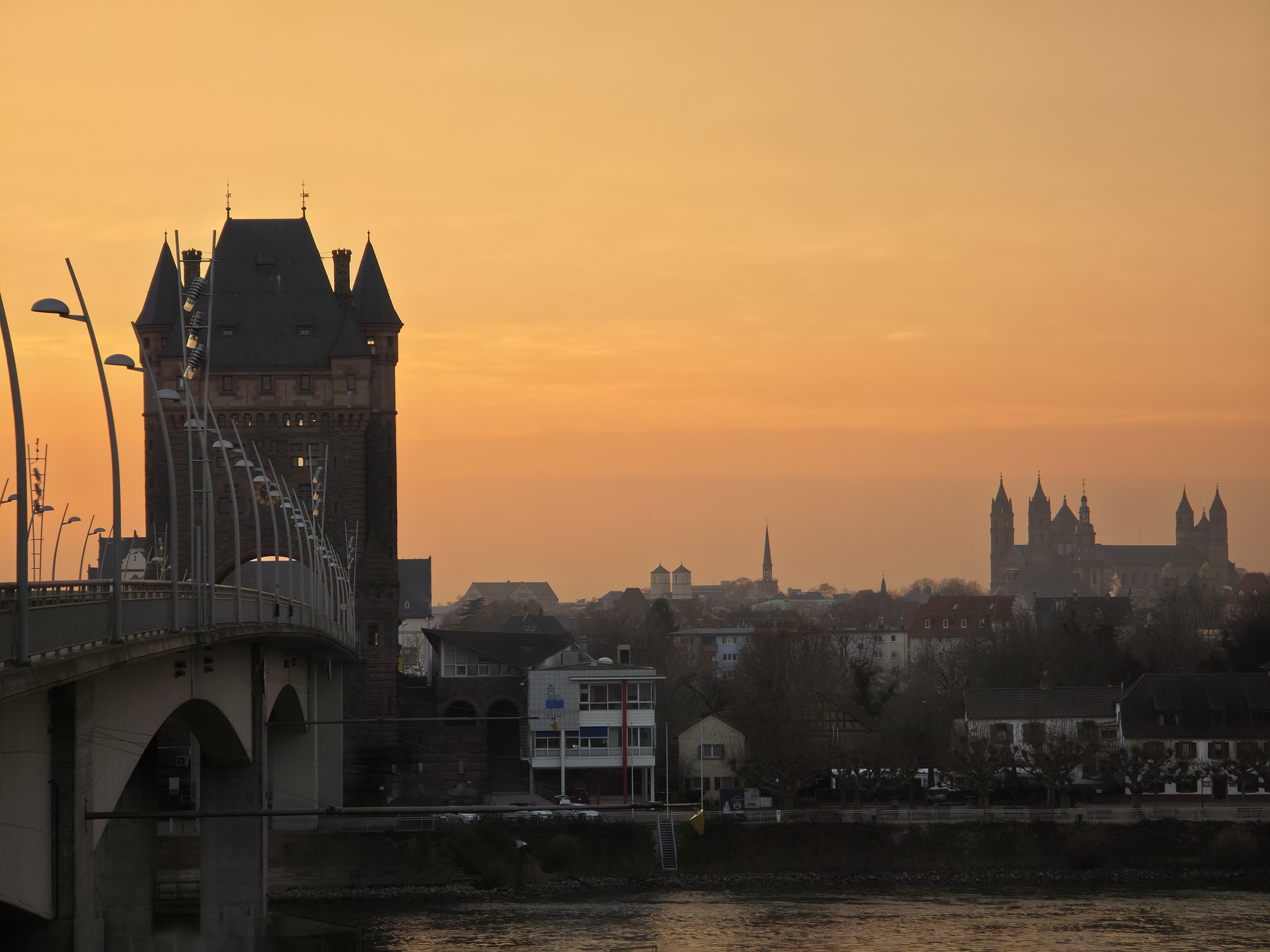
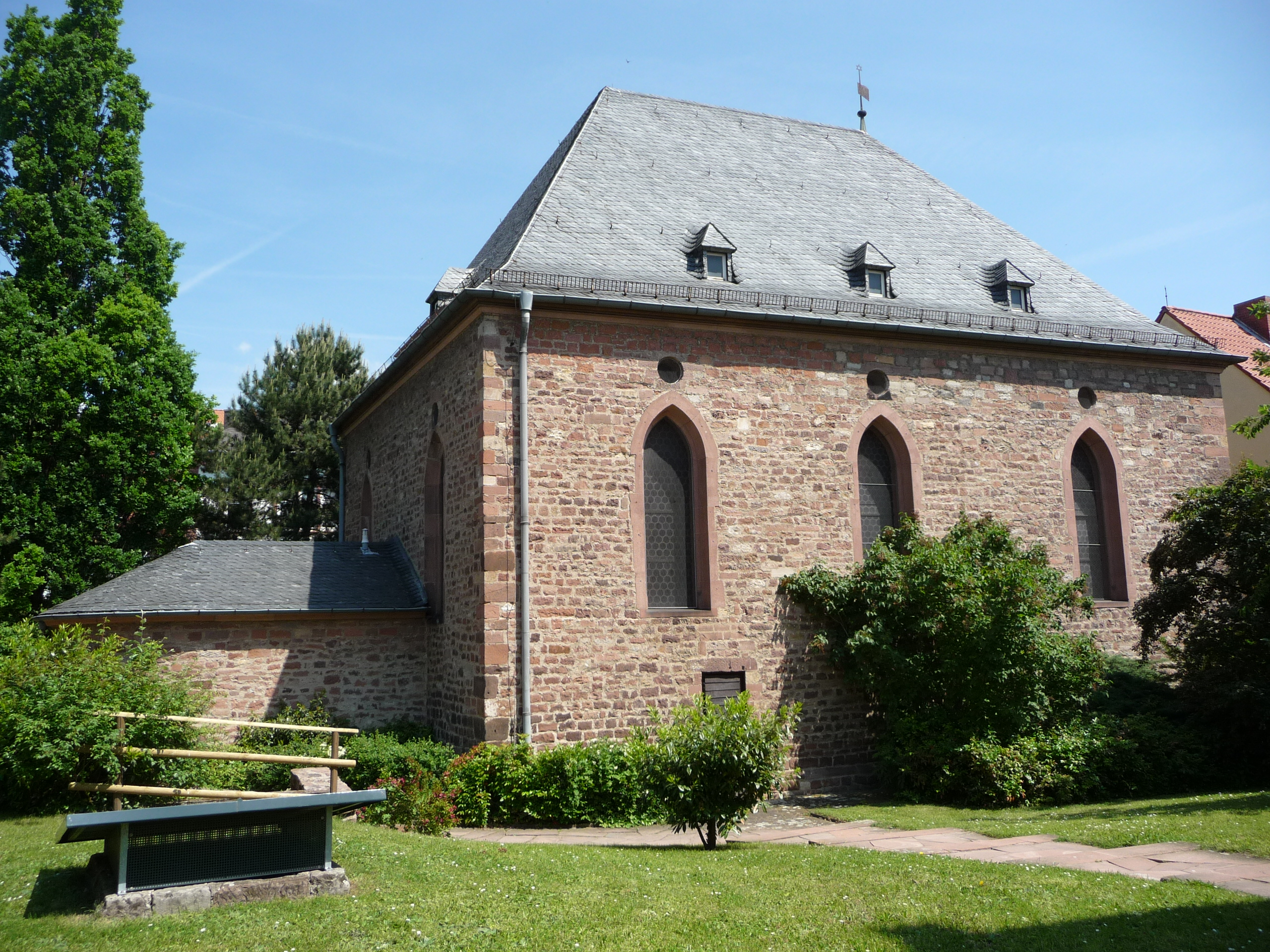
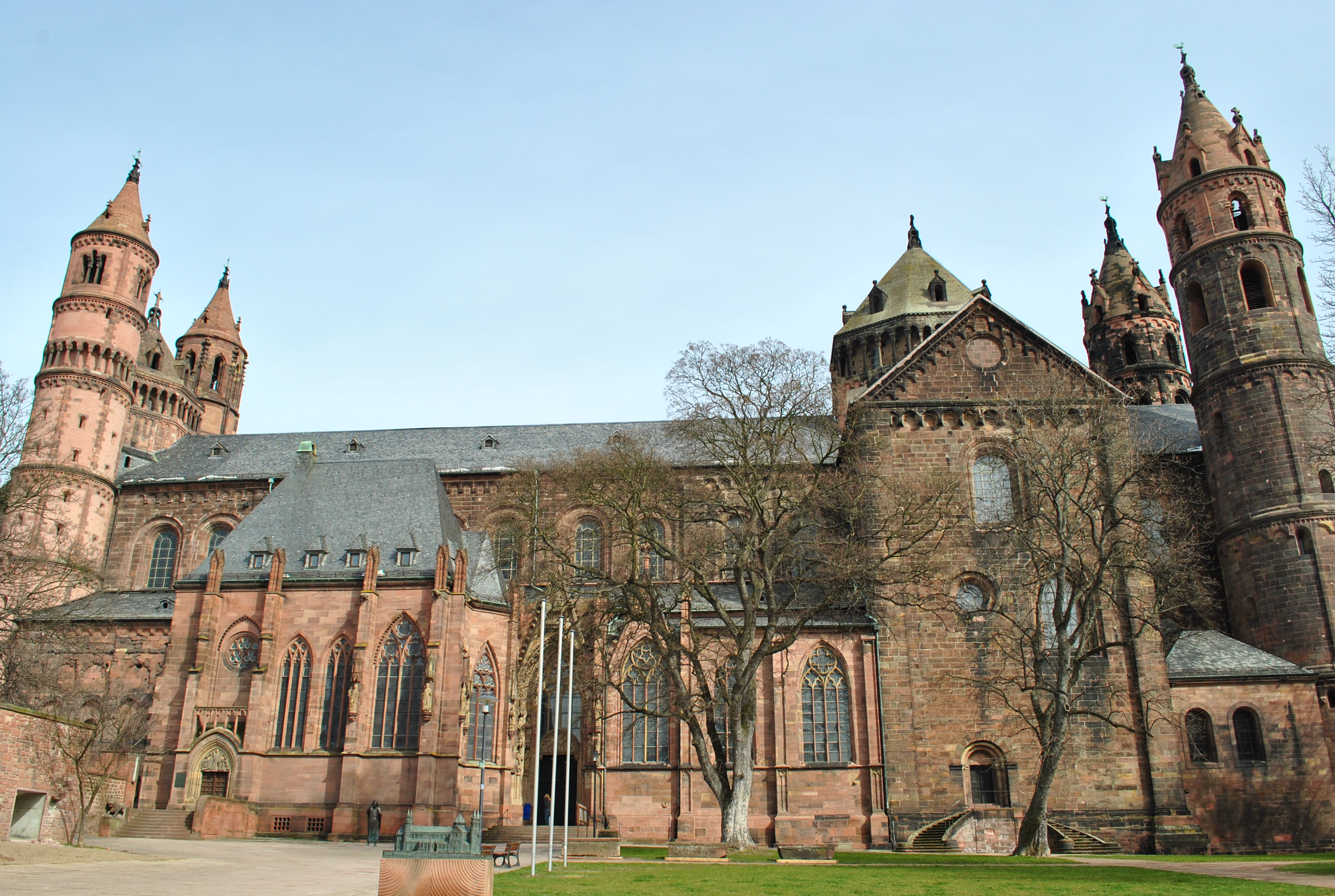
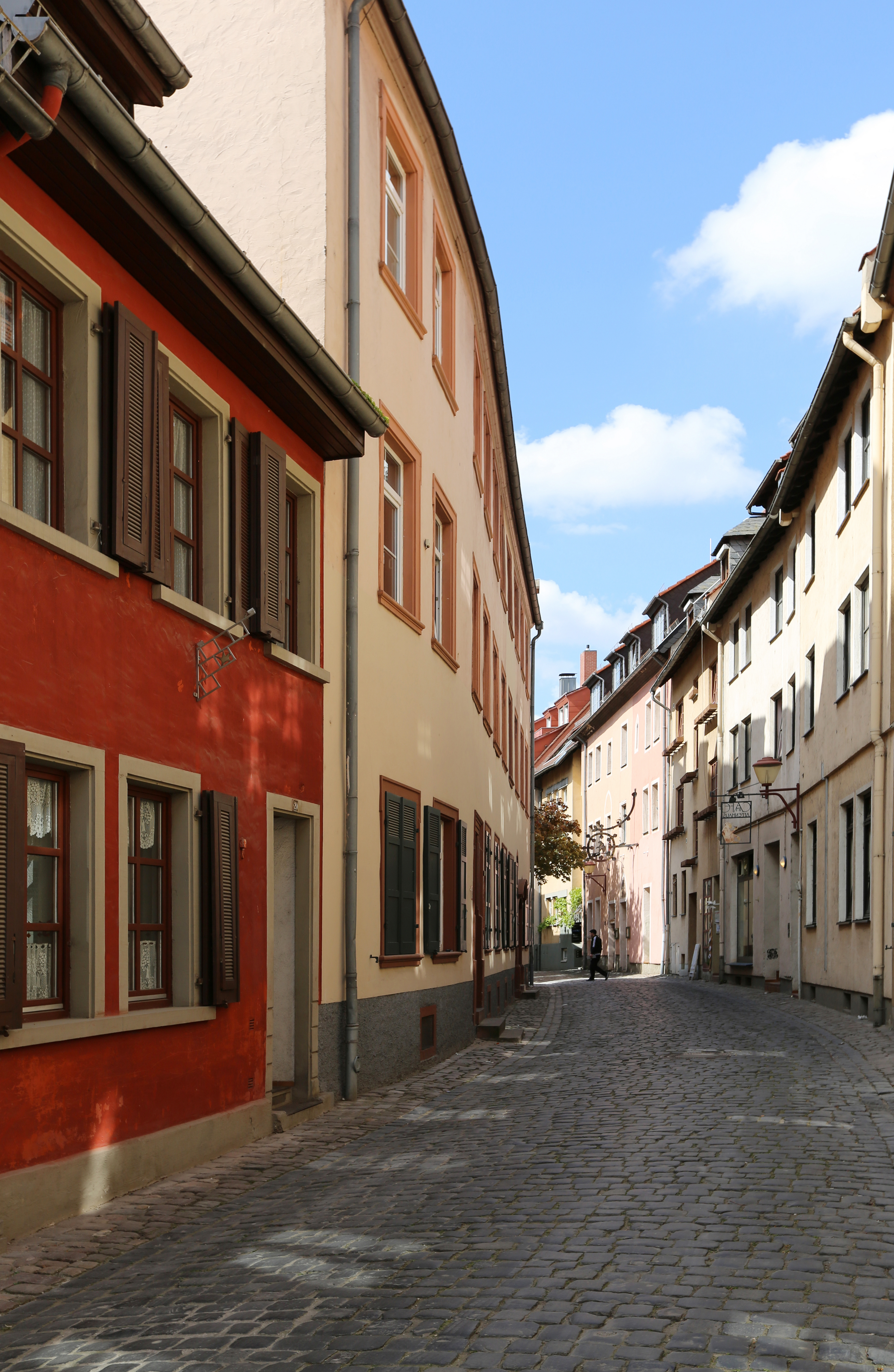
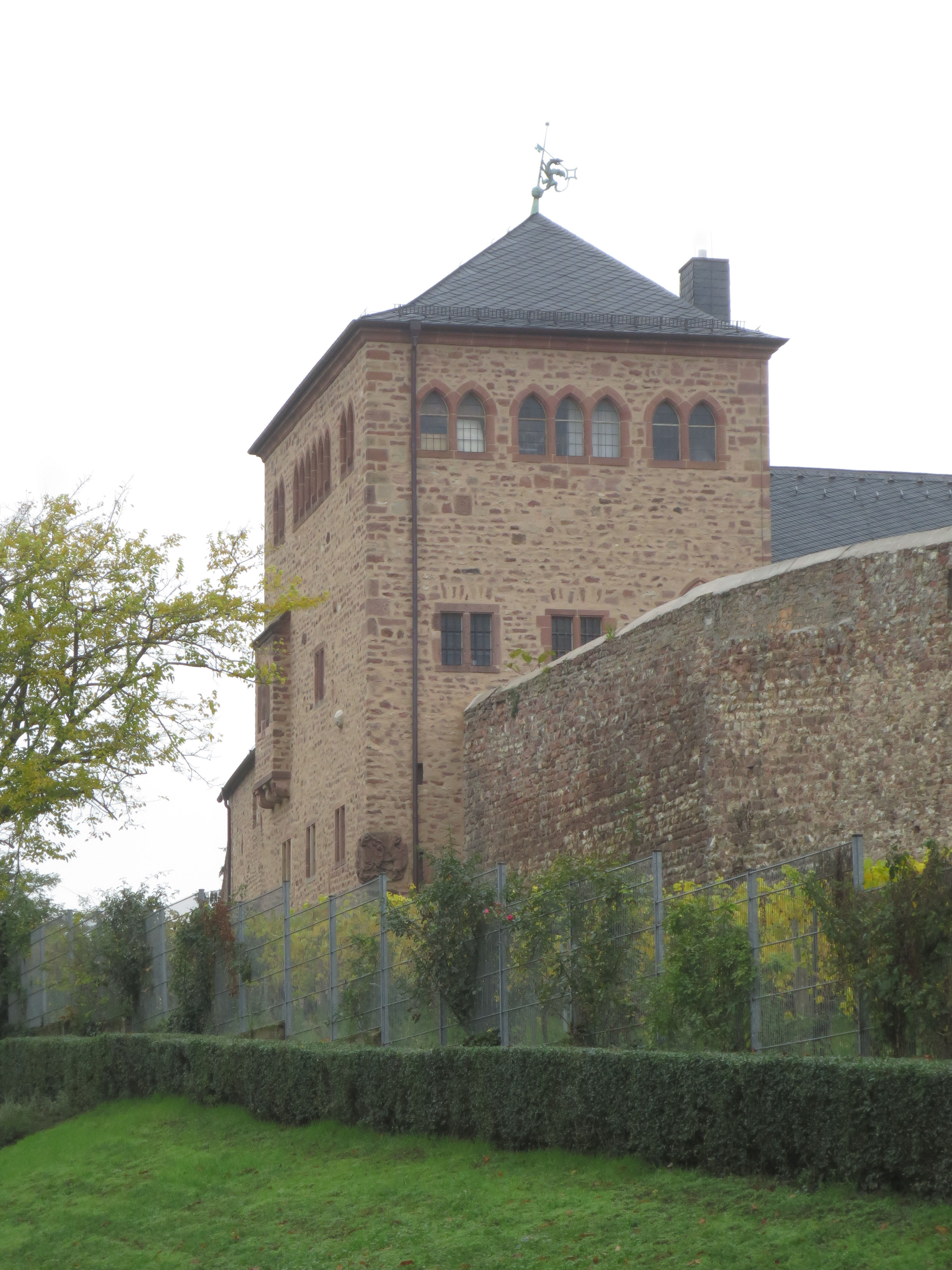
- Nibelungen Bridge over the Rhine in Worms Worms Synagogue Worms Cathedral Medieval city center Christoffelturm

- Flag Coat of arms Logo

- Location of Worms within Rheinland-Pfalz
- Interactive map of Worms
- Location within Germany Location within Rhineland-Palatinate
- Coordinates: 49°37′55″N 08°21′55″E
- Country: Germany
- State: Rhineland-Palatinate
- District: Urban district

Government
  - Mayor (2018–2026): Adolf Kessel (CDU)

Area
  - Total: 108.73 km^{2} (41.98 sq mi)
- Elevation: 100–167 m (328–548 ft)

Population (2025-12-31)
  - Total: 86,921
  - Density: 799.42/km^{2} (2,070.5/sq mi)
- Time zone: UTC+01:00 (CET)
  - Summer (DST): UTC+02:00 (CEST)
- Postal codes: 67547–67551
- Dialling codes: 06241, 06242, 06246, 06247
- Vehicle registration: WO
- Website: www.worms.de

UNESCO World Heritage Site
- Official name: ShUM Sites of Speyer, Worms and Mainz
- Type: Cultural
- Criteria: (ii)(iii)(iv)
- Designated: 2021
- Reference no.: 1636

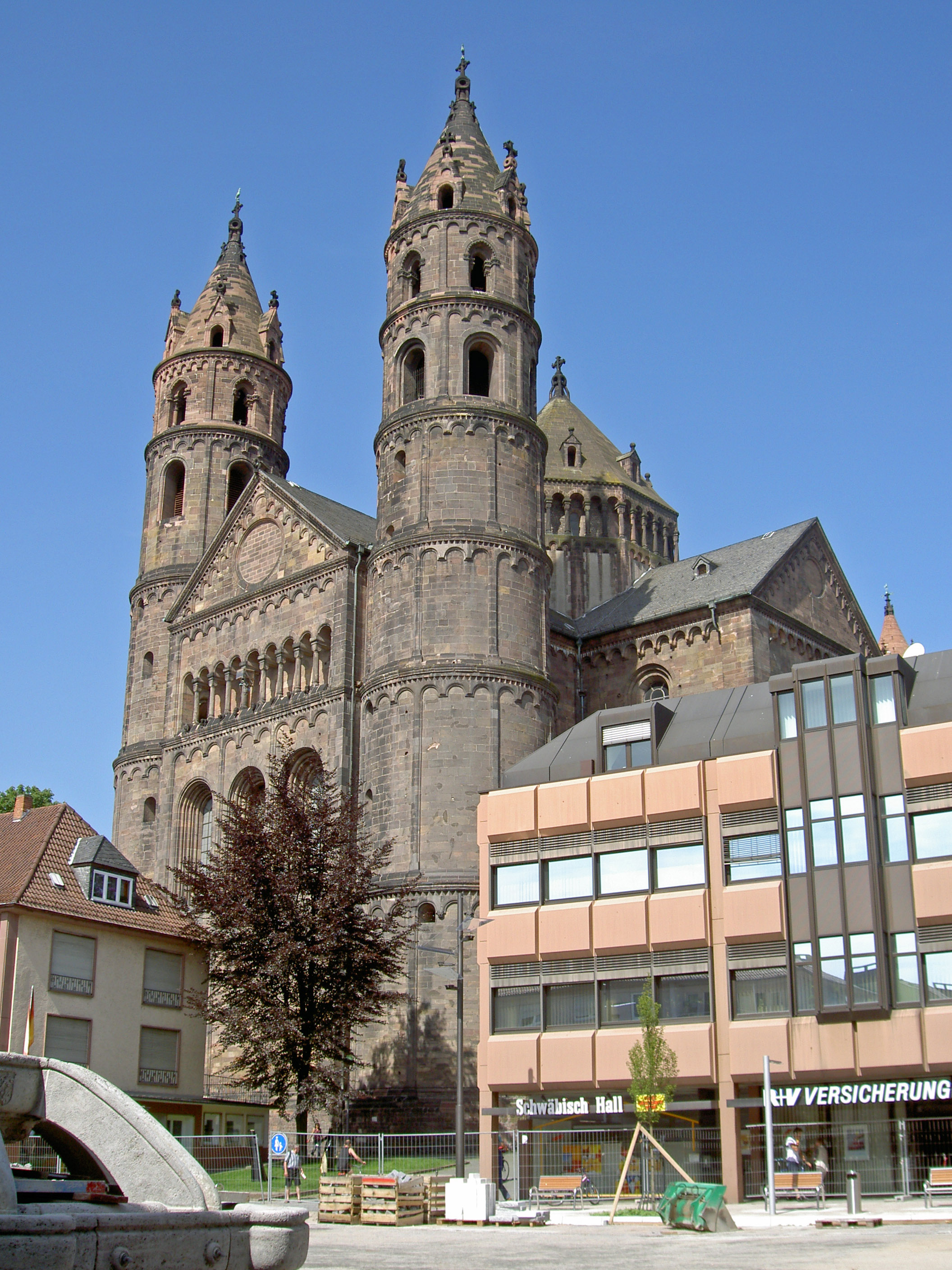
The medieval Cathedral of Worms

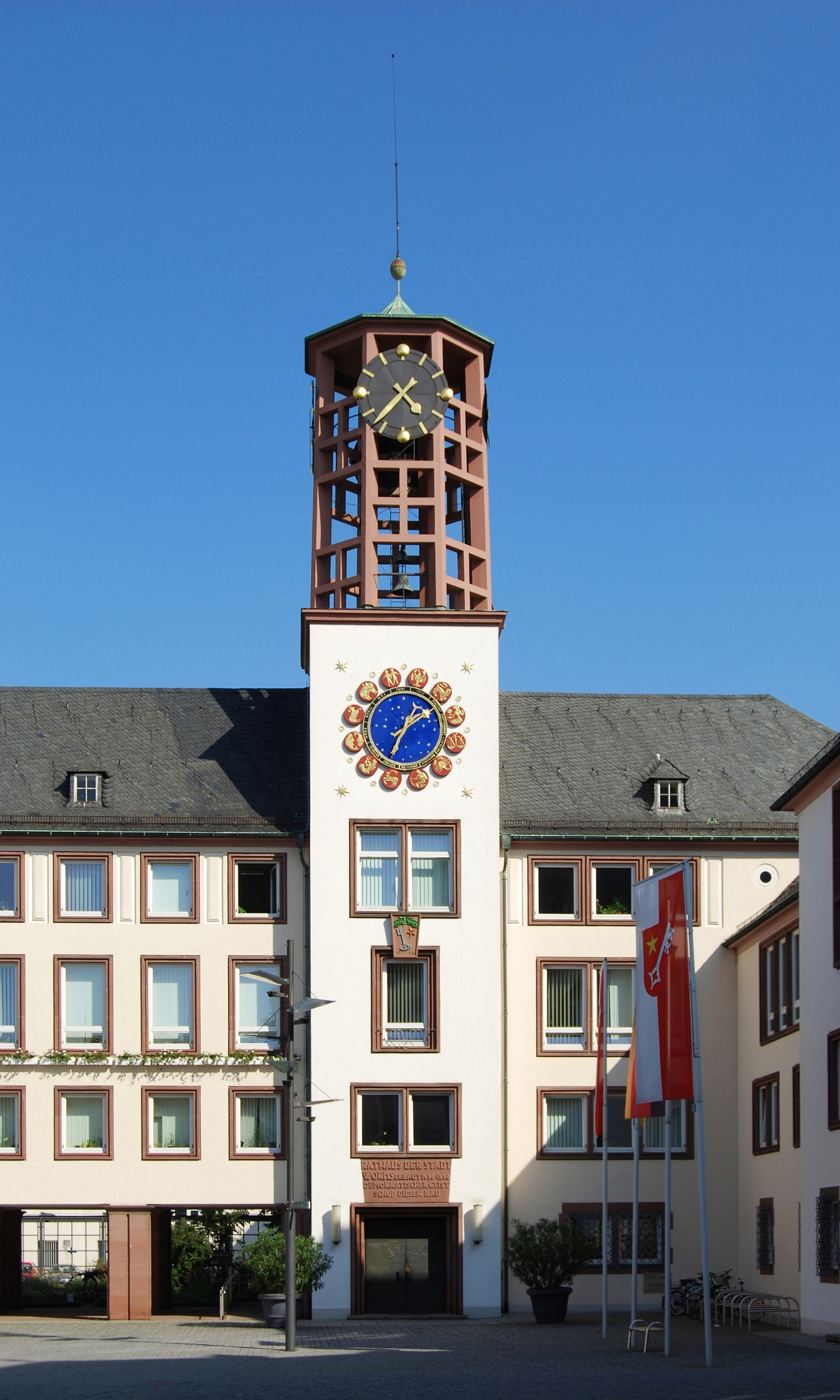
Town hall of Worms

Worms (/vɔːrmz, wɜːrmz/; German pronunciation: [vɔʁms]) is a city in Rhineland-Palatinate, Germany, situated on the Upper Rhine about 60 km (40 mi) south-southwest of Frankfurt am Main. It had about 84,646 inhabitants as of 2022.

A pre-Roman foundation, Worms is one of the oldest cities in northern Europe. It was the capital of the Kingdom of the Burgundians in the early fifth century, and hence is the scene of the medieval legends referring to this period, notably the first part of the Nibelungenlied.

Worms has been a Roman Catholic bishopric since at least 614, and was an important palatinate of Charlemagne. Worms Cathedral is one of the imperial cathedrals and among the finest examples of Romanesque architecture in Germany. Worms prospered in the High Middle Ages as an imperial free city. Among more than a hundred imperial diets held at Worms, the Diet of 1521 (commonly known as the Diet of Worms) ended with the Edict of Worms, in which Martin Luther was declared a heretic. Worms is also one of the historical ShUM-cities as a cultural center of Jewish life in Europe during the Middle Ages. Its Jewish sites (along with those in Speyer and Mainz) were inscribed on the UNESCO World Heritage List in 2021.

Today, the city is an industrial centre and is famed as the origin of Liebfraumilch wine. Its other industries include chemicals, metal goods, and fodder.

== Name ==
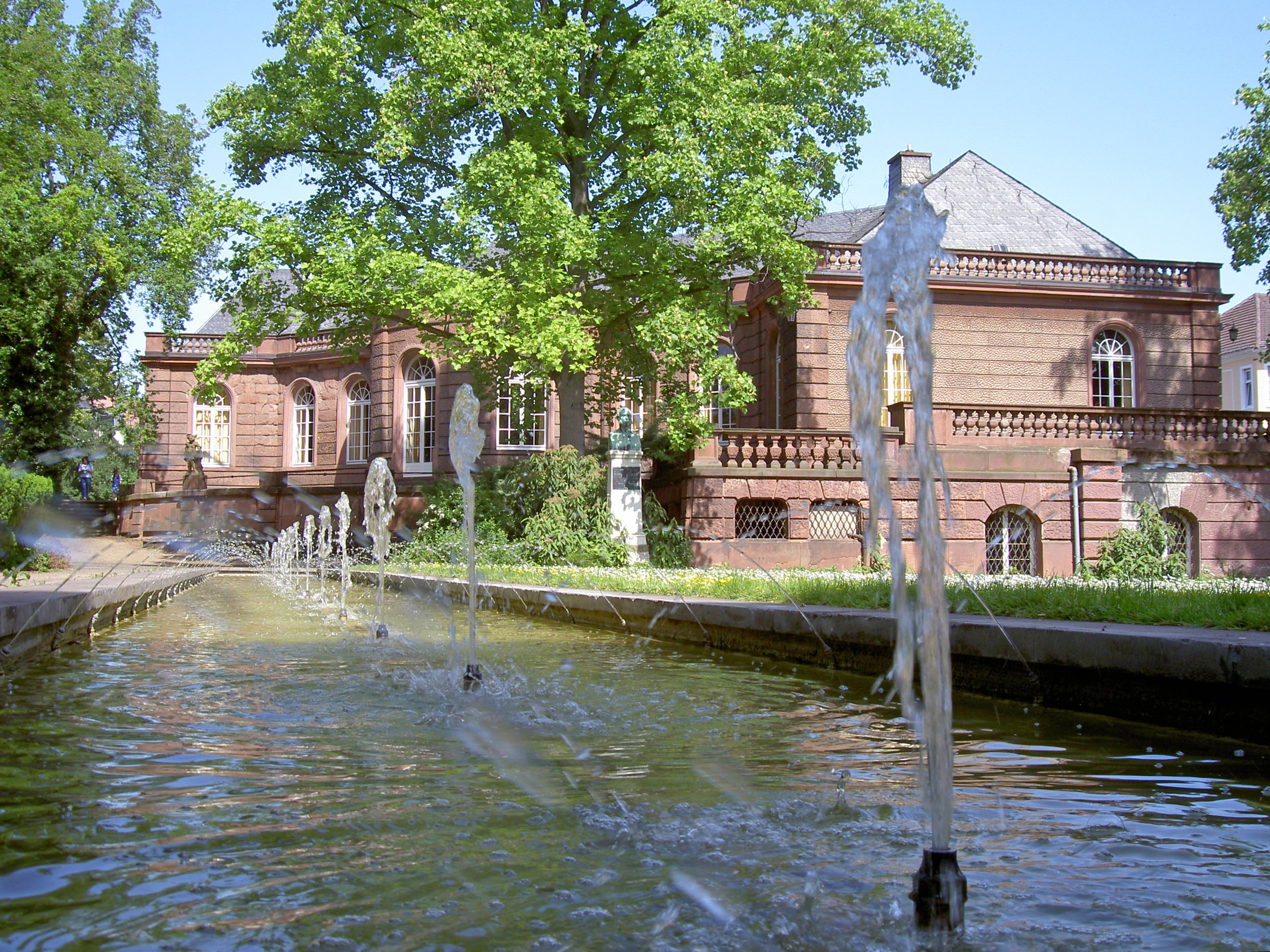
Heylshof Garden on the location of the former Bischofshof palace

Worms's name is of Celtic origin: Borbetomagus meant "settlement in a watery area". This was eventually transformed into the Latin name Vormatia, in use since the 6th century, which was preserved in the Medieval Hebrew form Vermayza (ורמייזא) and the contemporary Polish form Wormacja.

According to a legend printed in the 17th century in the book Ma'aseh Nisim by Juspa Schammes, the origin of the city's name is attributed to the mythical creature lint-wurm. This creature, resembling a snake and a worm, arrived in the city of Germisa and terrorized its inhabitants. Every day, the people held a lottery to determine which of them would be sacrificed to the lint-wurm in order to spare the city from destruction. Eventually, the lot fell on the queen. One of the city's heroes refused to allow her to sacrifice herself and offered to replace her on the condition that if he survived, she would marry him. The queen agreed, and he donned iron armor. After the lint-wurm swallowed him, he cut his way out from the inside and killed it. He married the queen, became king, and renamed the city to Worms to commemorate this tale.

== Geography ==
Worms is located on the west bank of the River Rhine between the cities of Ludwigshafen and Mainz. On the northern edge of the city, the Pfrimm flows into the Rhine, and on the southern edge, the Eisbach flows into the Rhine.

=== Boroughs ===
Worms has 13 boroughs (or "quarters") around the city centre. They are:

Name	Population	Direction and distance from city centre
Abenheim	2,744	Northwest 10 km (6.2 mi)
Heppenheim	2,073	Southwest 9 km (5.6 mi)
Herrnsheim	6,368	North 5 km (3.1 mi)
Hochheim	3,823	Northwest
Horchheim	4,770	Southwest 4.5 km (2.8 mi)
Ibersheim	692	North 13 km (8.1 mi)
Leiselheim	1,983	West 4 km (2.5 mi)
Neuhausen	10,633	North
Pfeddersheim	7,414	West 7 km (4.3 mi)
Pfiffligheim	3,668	West
Rheindürkheim	3,021	North 8 km (5.0 mi)
Weinsheim	2,800	Southwest 4 km (2.5 mi)
Wiesoppenheim	1,796	Southwest 5.5 km (3.4 mi)

=== Climate ===
The climate in the Rhine Valley is cool in winter and very warm in summer. Rainfall is below average for the surrounding areas. Winter snow accumulation is low and often melts quickly.

== History ==
=== Antiquity ===
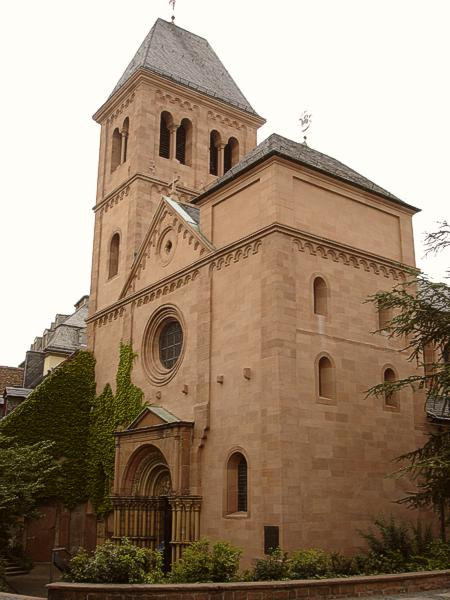
St Martin's Church

Worms was in ancient times a Celtic city named Borbetomagus, perhaps meaning "water meadow". Later it was conquered by the Germanic Vangiones tribe. In 14 BC, Romans under the command of Drusus captured and fortified the city, and from that time onwards, a small troop of infantry and cavalry was garrisoned there. The Romans renamed the city as Augusta Vangionum, after the then-emperor and the local tribe. The name does not seem to have taken hold, however, and from Borbetomagus developed the German Worms and Latin Wormatia; as late as the modern period, the city name was written as Wormbs. The garrison grew into a small town with a regular Roman street plan, a forum, and temples for the main gods Jupiter, Juno, Minerva (whose temple was the site of the later cathedral), and Mars.

Roman inscriptions, altars, and votive offerings can be seen in the archaeological museum, along with one of Europe's largest collections of Roman glass. Local potters worked in the town's south quarter. Fragments of amphorae contain traces of olive oil from Hispania Baetica, doubtless transported by sea and then up the Rhine by ship.

During the disorders of 411–413 AD, Roman usurper Jovinus established himself in Borbetomagus as a puppet-emperor with the help of King Gunther of the Burgundians, who had settled in the area between the Rhine and Moselle some years before. The city became the capital of the Burgundian kingdom under Gunther (also known as Gundicar). Few remains of this early Burgundian kingdom survive, because in 436, it was all but destroyed by a combined army of Romans (led by Aëtius) and Huns (led by Attila); a belt clasp found at Worms-Abenheim is a museum treasure. Provoked by Burgundian raids against Roman settlements, the combined Romano-Hunnic army destroyed the Burgundian army at the Battle of Worms (436), killing King Gunther. About 20,000 are said to have been killed. The Romans led the survivors southwards to the Roman district of Sapaudia (modern-day Savoy). The story of this war later inspired the Nibelungenlied. The city appears on the Peutinger Map, dated to the fourth century.

=== Middle Ages ===
The bishopric of Worms existed by at least 614. In the Frankish Empire, the city was the location of an important palace of Charlemagne. The bishops administered the city and its territory. The most famous of the early medieval bishops was Burchard of Worms. In 868, an important synod was held in Worms. Around 900, the circuit wall was rebuilt according to the wall-building ordinance of Bishop Thietlach.

Worms prospered in the High Middle Ages. Having received far-reaching privileges from King Henry IV as early as 1074, the city became an imperial free city. The bishops resided at Ladenburg and only had jurisdiction over Worms Cathedral itself. During the People's Crusade, more precisely during the Rhineland massacres, 800 to 1000 Jews were massacred by the army of Count Emich. In 1122, the Concordat of Worms was signed; the 1495 imperial diet met here and made an attempt at reforming the disintegrating Imperial Circle Estates by the Imperial Reform. Most important, among more than 100 imperial diets held at Worms, that of 1521 (commonly known as the Diet of Worms) ended with the Edict of Worms, in which Martin Luther was declared a heretic after refusing to recant his religious beliefs. Worms was also the birthplace of the first Bibles of the Reformation, both Martin Luther's German Bible and William Tyndale's first complete English New Testament by 1526.

=== Modern era ===
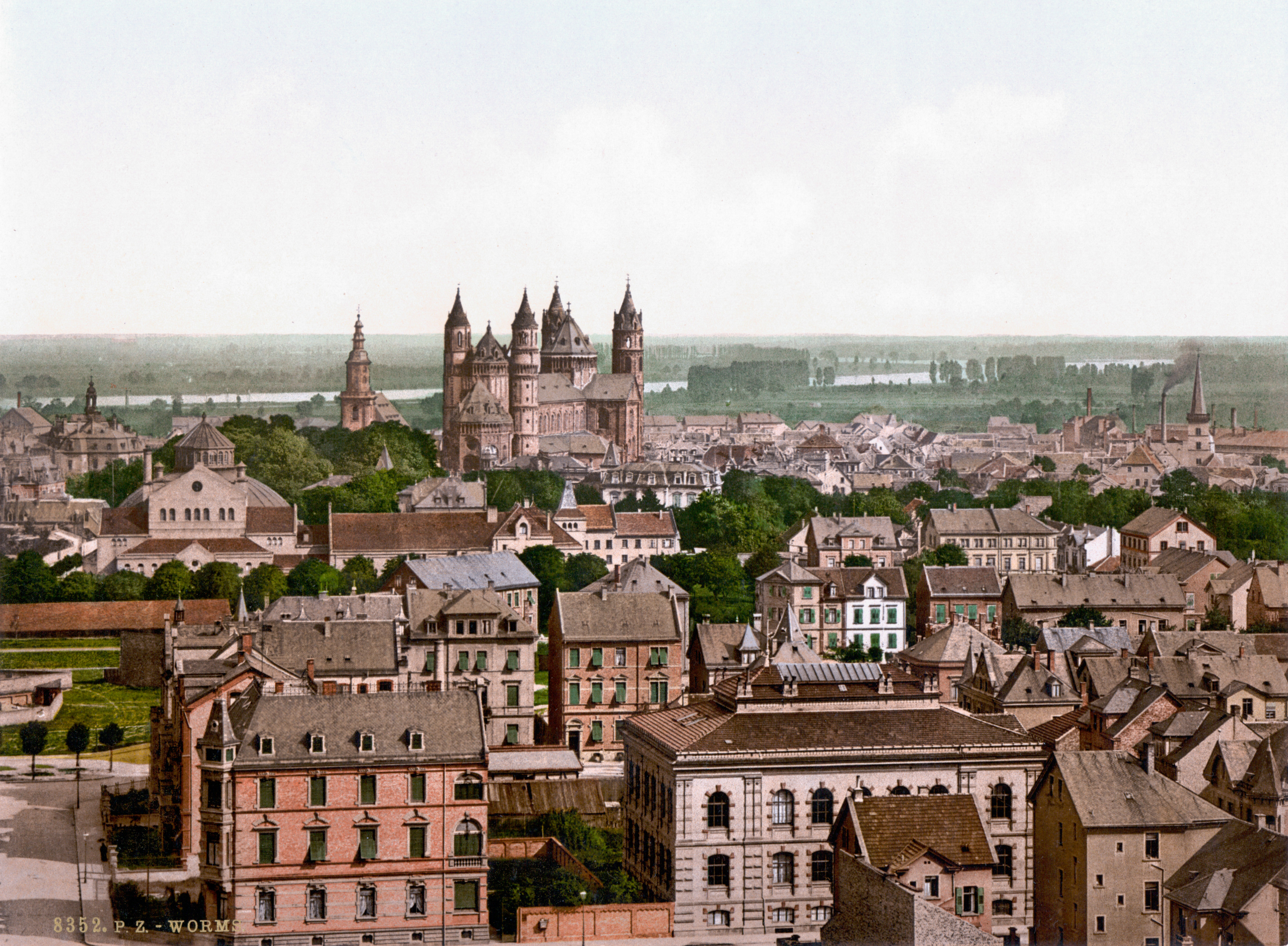
Worms around 1900

In 1689 during the Nine Years' War, Worms (like the nearby towns and cities of Heidelberg, Mannheim, Oppenheim, Speyer, and Bingen) was sacked by troops of Louis XIV of France, though the French only held the city for a few weeks. In 1743, the Treaty of Worms was signed, forming a political alliance between Great Britain, Austria, and the Kingdom of Sardinia. In 1792, the city was occupied by troops of the French First Republic during the French Revolutionary Wars. The Bishopric of Worms was secularized in 1801, with the city being annexed into the First French Empire. In 1815, Worms passed to the Grand Duchy of Hesse in accordance with the Congress of Vienna, and the city was subsequently administered within Rhenish Hesse.

After the Battle of the Bulge in early 1945, Allied armies advanced into the Rhineland in preparation for a massive assault into the heart of the Reich. Worms was a German strongpoint on the west bank of the Rhine, and the forces there resisted the Allied advance tenaciously. Worms was, thus, heavily bombed by the Royal Air Force and the U.S. Army Air Forces in two attacks on 21 February and 18 March 1945, respectively. A postwar survey estimated that 39% of the town's developed area was destroyed. The RAF attack on 21 February was aimed at the main railway station on the edge of the inner city, and at chemical plants southwest of the inner city, but also destroyed large areas of the city centre. Carried out by 334 bombers, the attack in a few minutes rained 1,100 tons of bombs on the inner city, and Worms Cathedral was among the buildings set on fire. The Americans did not enter the city until the Rhine crossings began after the seizure of the Remagen Bridge.

In the attacks, 239 inhabitants were killed in the first and 141 in the second; 35,000 (60% of the population of 58,000) were made homeless. In all, 6490 buildings were severely damaged or destroyed. After the war, the inner city was rebuilt, mostly in modern style. Around a third of Worms's buildings are from before 1950. Postwar Worms became part of the new state of Rhineland-Palatinate; the borough Rosengarten, on the east bank of the Rhine, was lost to Hesse.

Worms today fiercely vies with the cities Trier and Cologne for the title of "Oldest City in Germany". A multimedia Nibelungenmuseum was opened in 2001, and a yearly festival in front of the Dom, the Worms Cathedral, attempts to recapture the atmosphere of the pre-Christian period.

In 2010, the Worms synagogue was firebombed. Eight corners of the building were set ablaze, and a Molotov cocktail was thrown at a window, but with no injuries. Kurt Beck, Minister-President of Rhineland-Palatinate, condemned the attack and vowed to mobilize all necessary resources to find the perpetrators, saying, "We will not tolerate such an attack on a synagogue".

== The Jewish community of Varmayza ==
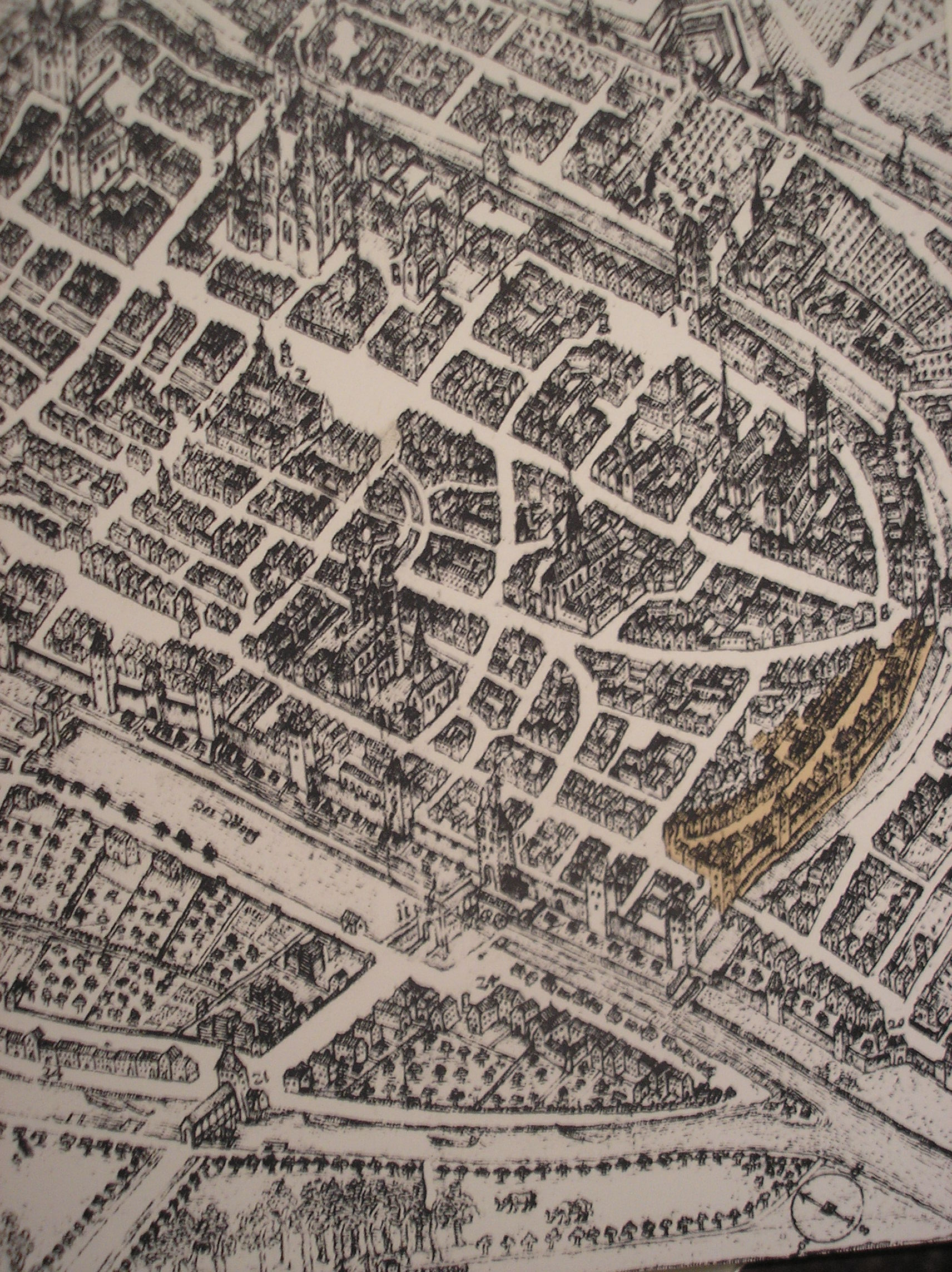
Map of Worms in 1630: The Jewish Alley is marked in yellow.

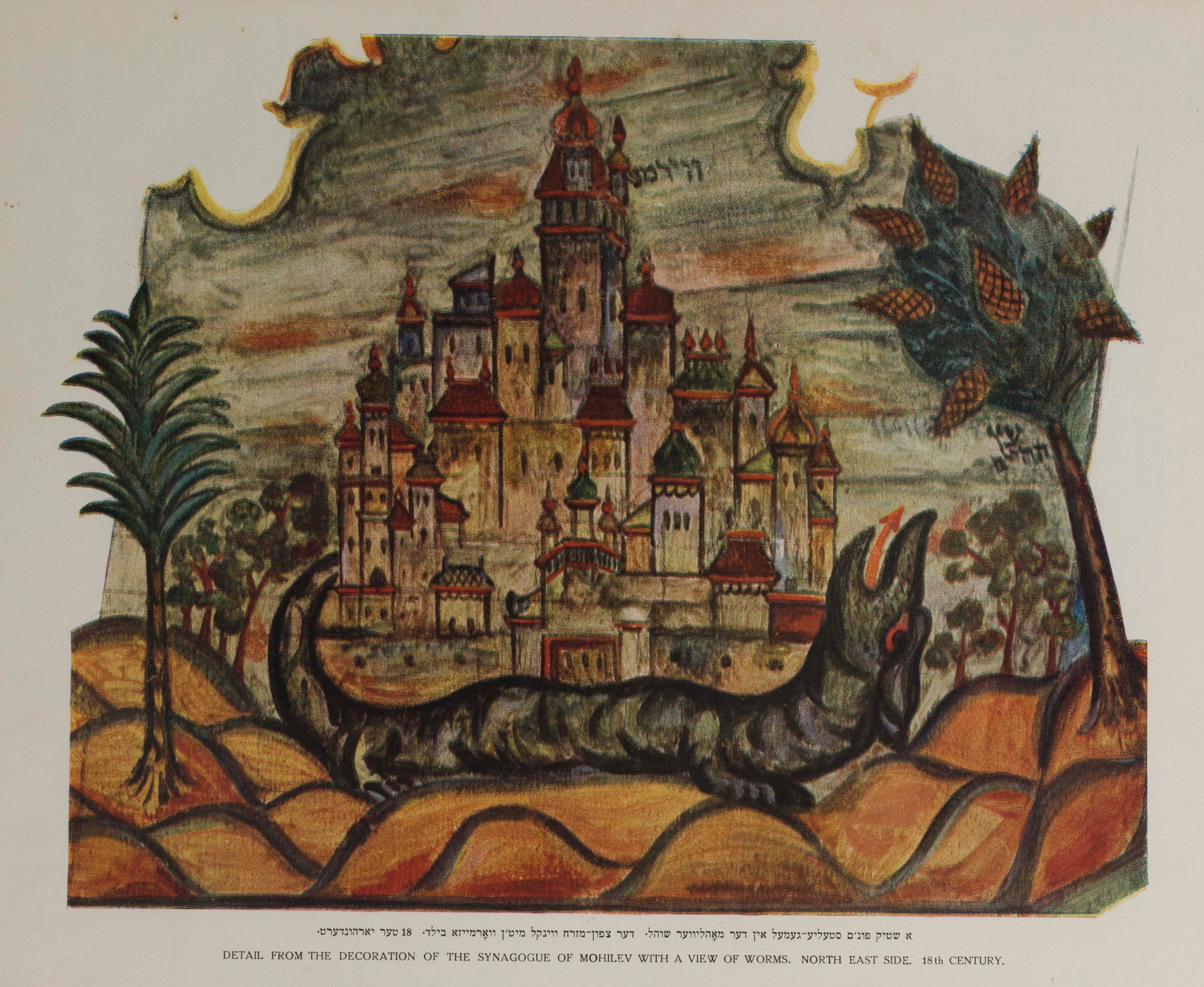
A painting of the city of Worms, featuring the mythical creature lint wurm, as depicted in the book Ma'aseh Nissim by Juspa Schammes. At the top of the image, the word "wormaish" (ווירמש) can be seen. The painting was displayed in Cold Synagogue, Mogilev.

The Free Imperial City of Worms, known in medieval Hebrew by the name Varmayza or Vermaysa (Hebrew: וורמיזא, וורמישא), was a centre of medieval Ashkenazic Jewry. The Jewish community was established there in the late 10th century, and Worms's first synagogue was erected in 1034. The Jewish community settled in a separate neighborhood in the city called the Judengasse. In 1096, 800 to 1000 Jews were murdered by crusaders and the local mob, what later became known as Rhineland massacres or Gzerot Tatnó (Hebrew: גזרות תתנ"ו, "Edicts of 4856"). The Jewish Cemetery in Worms, dating from the 11th century, is believed to be the oldest surviving in situ cemetery in Europe. The Rashi Synagogue, which dates from 1175 and was carefully reconstructed after its desecration on Kristallnacht, is the oldest in Germany.

Prominent students, rabbis, and scholars of Worms include Shlomo Yitzhaki (Rashi) who studied with R. Yizhak Halevi, Meir of Rothenburg (Maharam), Elazar Rokeach, Yaakov ben Moshe Levi Moelin (Maharil), and Yair Bacharach. At the rabbinical synod held at Worms at the turn of the 11th century, Rabbi Gershom ben Judah (Rabbeinu Gershom) explicitly prohibited polygamy for the first time. The community's customs were collected and written by Juspa Schammes in a Minhagbuch (book of customs) and preserved ancient traditions unique to the community.

The Jewish community was destroyed and expelled from the city several times. The main expulsions were both in 1615 after the city's residents committed a pogrom against the Jewish community and in 1689 during the Nine Years' War by troops of Louis XIV (with all the city's citizens), After a few years, the Jews were allowed to return to live in the city. Despite this, until Kristallnacht in 1938, the Jewish Quarter of Worms was a centre of Jewish life. It was among the oldest Jewish communities that maintained continuity over time, and a beautiful example of this is the 900th anniversary celebrations of the synagogue held in 1934.

Worms today has only a very small Jewish population, and a recognizable Jewish community as such no longer exists. After renovations in the 1970s and 1980s, though, many of the buildings of the quarter can be seen in a close-to-original state, preserved as an outdoor museum. The Jewish sites (along with those in Speyer and Mainz) were inscribed on the UNESCO World Heritage List in 2021.

== Main sights ==
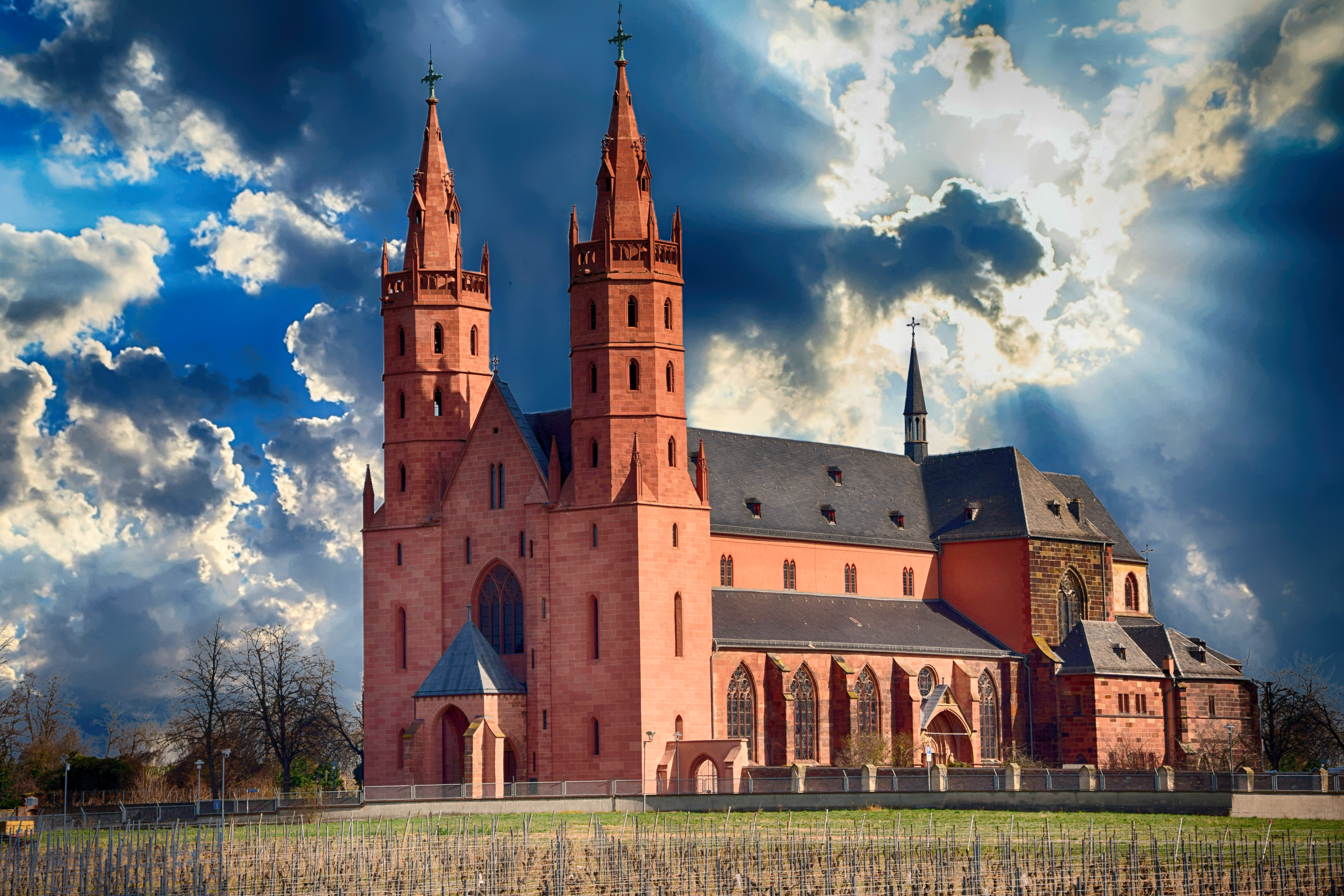
The Gothic Liebfrauenkirche (Church of Our Lady). Wine from the adjacent vineyard gave its name to the (now more generic) Liebfraumilch style.

- The renovated (1886–1935) Romanesque Cathedral, dedicated to St Peter (12th–13th century)
- Reformation Memorial church of the Holy Trinity, the city's largest Protestant church (17th century)
- St Paul's Church (Pauluskirche) (13th century)
- St Andrew's Collegiate Church (Andreaskirche) (13th century)
- St Martin's Church (Martinskirche) (13th century)
- Liebfrauenkirche (15th century)
- Luther Monument (Lutherdenkmal) (1868) (designed by Ernst Rietschel)
- ShUM city of Worms, UNESCO World Heritage Site
  - Rashi Synagogue and Mikvah
  - Jewish Museum in the Rashi-House
  - Jewish Cemetery
- Nibelungen Museum, celebrating the Middle High German epic poem Das Nibelungenlied (The Song of the Nibelungs)
- Magnuskirche, the city's smallest church, which possibly originates from the eighth century

== Transport ==
The town is served by Frankfurt Airport, which is located 64 km (40 mi) to the north-east of Worms. The airport provides domestic and international destinations. The trip to and from the airport takes about 42 minutes by car or approximately 57 minutes by InterCityExpress train.

== Twin towns – sister cities ==
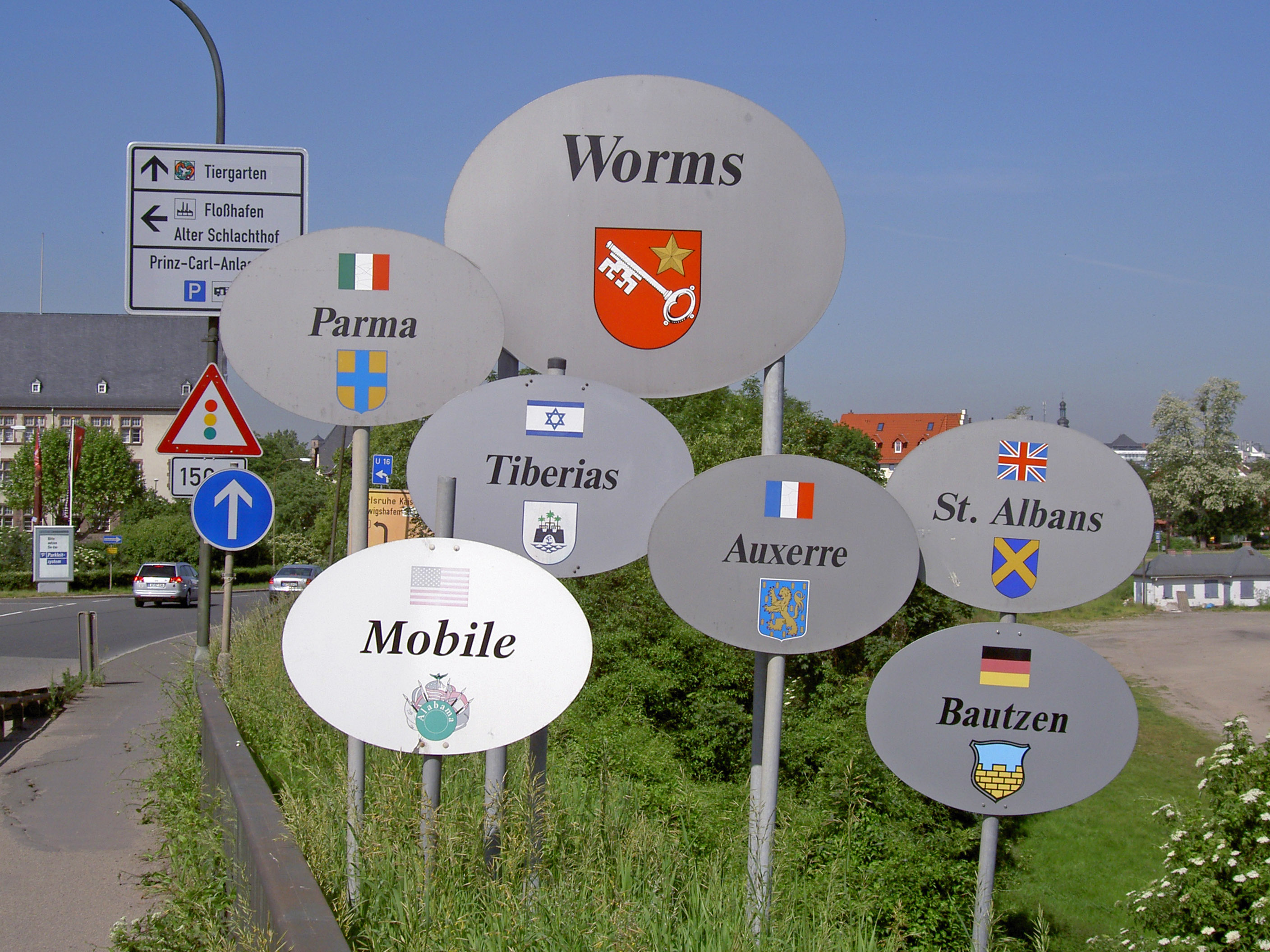
Worms's twin towns

Worms is twinned with:

- Auxerre, France
- Bautzen, Germany
- Mobile, United States
- Ningde, China
- Parma, Italy
- St Albans, United Kingdom
- Tiberias, Israel

== People ==
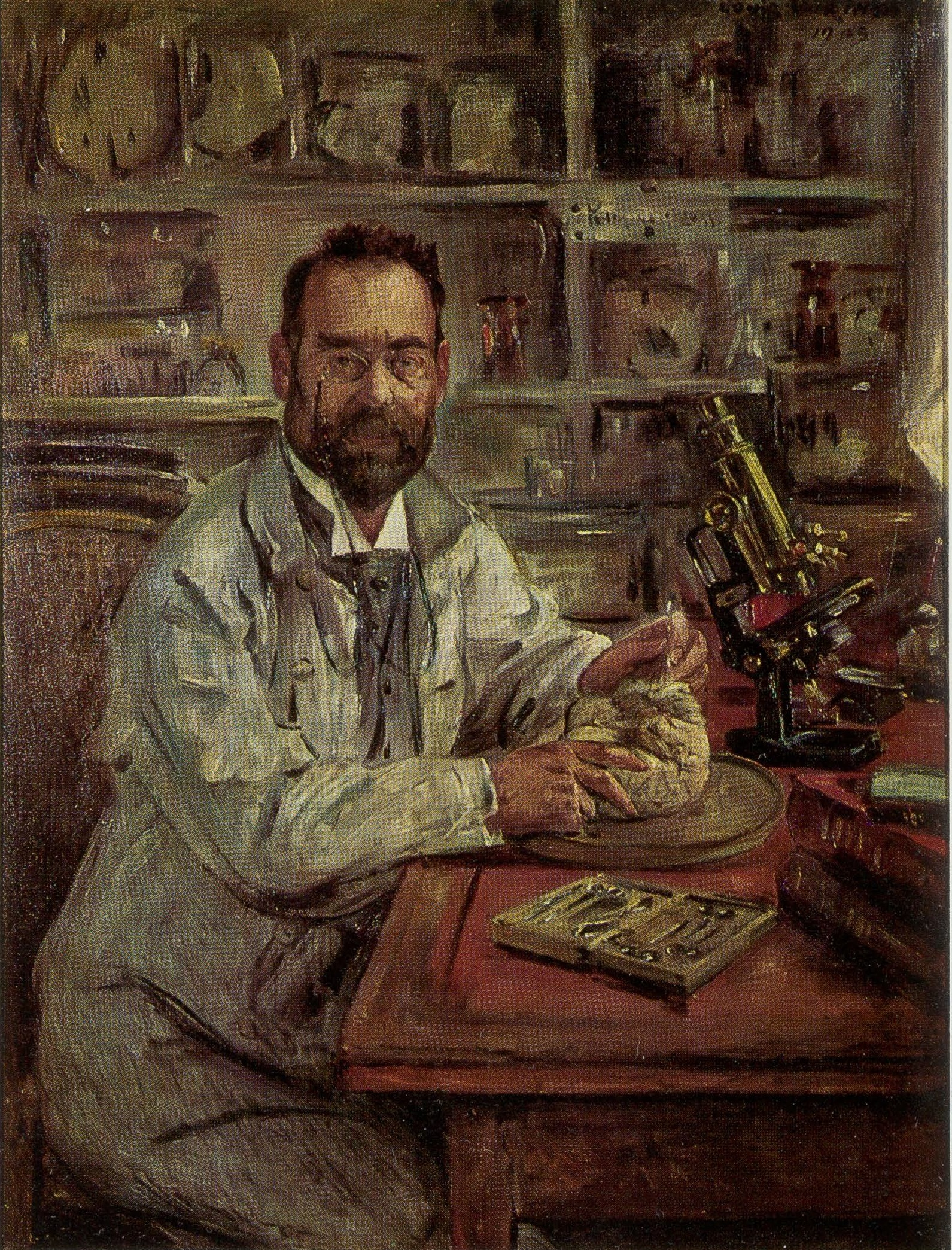
Ludwig Edinger painted by Lovis Corinth

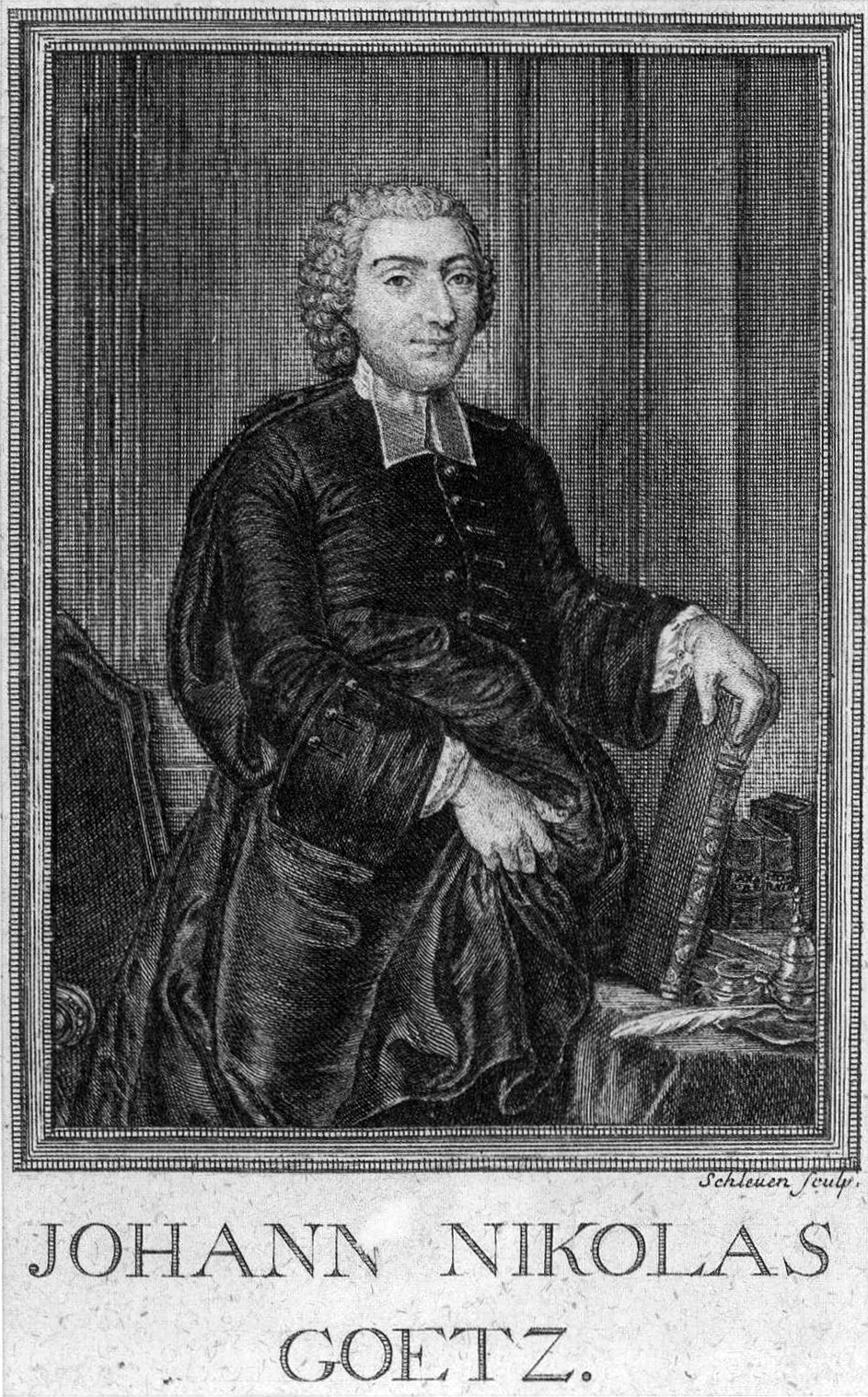
Johann Nikolaus Götz (1755)

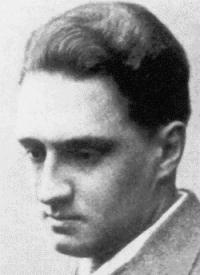
Rudi Stephan

- Saint Erentrude, or Erentraud (c. 650–710), virgin saint of the Roman Catholic Church
- Heribert of Cologne (c. 970–1021, archbishop-elector of Cologne and Chancellor of the Holy Roman Empıre
- Isaac ben Eliezer Halevi (died 1070), French rabbi
- Minna of Worms (died 1096), influential Jewish citizen, victim of the Worms massacre (1096)
- Rashi (Shlomo Yitzhaki; 1040–1105), rabbi, studied in the Worms Yeshiva in 1065–1070
- Meir of Rothenburg (c. 1215–1293), rabbi and poet
- Yaakov ben Moshe Levi Moelin (1365–1427), Rabbi of Mainz
- Hans Folz (1435/1440–1513), notable medieval author
- Conrad Meit (or Conrat Meit) (1480s–1550/1551), Renaissance sculptor, mostly in the Low Countries
- Isaac ben Eliezer, 15th century rabbi
- Juspa Schammes (1604–1678), caretaker of the Worms Synagogue and writer
- Yair Bacharach (1638–1702), rabbi, was the chief rabbi of worms in 1699–1702
- Johann Nikolaus Götz (1721–1781), poet
- Ferdinand Eberstadt (1808–1888), textile merchant and mayor of Worms
- Samuel Adler (1809–1891), German-American Reform rabbi
- Solomon Loeb (1828–1903), American banker and philanthropist
- John Derst (1838–1928), baker
- Friedrich Gernsheim (1839–1916), composer, conductor and pianist
- Ida Straus (1849–1912), wife of Isidor Straus, voluntarily remained with husband on board the RMS Titanic
- Ludwig Edinger (1855–1918), anatomist and neurologist
- Siegfried Guggenheim (1873–1961), lawyer, notary and art collector
- Hugo Sinzheimer (1875–1945), legal scholar, member of the Constitutional Convention of 1919
- Hermann Staudinger (1881–1965), organic chemist, Nobel Prize in Chemistry 1953
- Emil Stumpp (1886–1941), cartoonist, died in jail after doing an unflattering portrait of Adolf Hitler
- Rudi Stephan (1887–1915), composer
- Hanya Holm (1893–1992), choreographer, dancer, educator and one of the founders of American Modern Dance
- Richard Hildebrandt (1897–1951), politician in Nazi Germany and member of the Reichstag executed for war crimes
- Curtis Bernhardt (1899–1981), film director
- Hans Hinkel (1901–1960), journalist and Nazi cultural functionary
- Hans Diller (1905–1977), classical scholar specializing in Ancient Greek medicine
- Vladimir Kagan (1927–2016), furniture designer
- Rolf Wilhelm Brednich (born 1935), folklorist
- Florian Gerster (born 1949), politician (SPD), former chairman of the Federal Employment Agency
- Rod Temperton (1949–2016), English songwriter, record producer and musician
- Monika Stolz (born 1951), politician (CDU), Member of Landtag Baden-Württemberg since 2001
- Petra Gerster (born 1955), television journalist (ZDF)
- Markus Weinmann (born 1974), agricultural scientist in the area of plant physiology
- Timo Hildebrand (born 1979), footballer
- Marvin Dienst (born 1997), German racing driver
- Alica Schmidt (born 1998), track and field athlete, fitness coach

== See also ==
- Wormser
