= Nibelungen Museum Worms =

Museum in Worms, Germany

Coordinates: 49.6294°N 8.3670°E

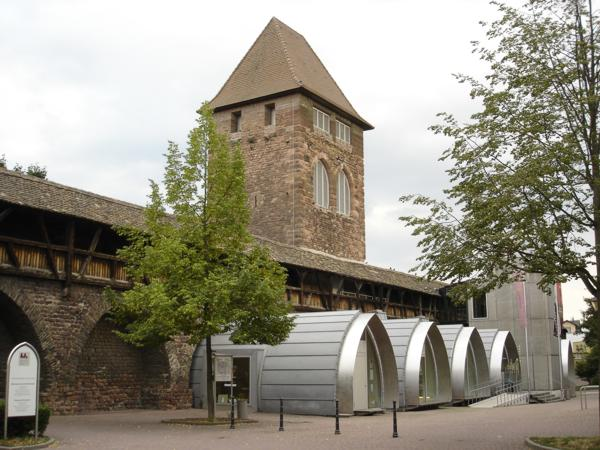
Nibelungen Museum Worms

The Nibelungen Museum Worms in Worms, Germany, started in 2001 and is dedicated to the Nibelungensage. The museum integrates a part of the historical city wall of Worms as well as two towers from the 12th century. The audiovisual permanent exhibition examines the mythical character of the Nibelungensage. The premises of the museum are also used for cultural events, talks and symposiums.

== History ==
=== Prehistory and planning ===
Most of the scenes of the Song of the Nibelungs take place either in Worms itself or in its surroundings. This is also why the city plays an important role in the perception of the Nibelungenlied for centuries.

Due to longstanding considerations in order to appreciate the importance of the city Worms as most important setting of the legend the city commissioned an expert opinion in July 1996. Especially one specific well preserved section of the medieval fortifications was taken into consideration. This is because of its authenticity and the convenient location between the Worms Cathedral and the Rhine promenade with its Hagendenkmal.

The decision of the city council was made in February 1997 in favour of the concept of the agency Auber + Hoge & associés (A+H) in Paris.

=== Project implementation ===
According to archeological finds in the excavation area in early 1999, nothing was standing in the way of the construction of the estimated 4.5 million Euro total cost of the museum. Meanwhile, the project was facing increased criticism from parts of Worms’ public. This was reflected in a polarizing debate in local media which went on for months. A citizens' initiative brought the construction to a halt with the help of a successful public petition. In the following referendum on September 12, 1999, a majority of the voters answered “no” to the question: "Do you want a Nibelungen museum to be built in Worms along the city wall, which would be financed by public funding worth millions and would mean that funding for further meaningful projects would not be available anymore?". With 22% the participation failed to reach the required quorum of the Rheinland-Pfalz. This is why the groundbreaking ceremony could take place on November 18, 1999. The Nibelungen Museum Worms was opened on August 18, 2001, after an almost two-year construction period.

== The concept ==
The German Nibelungen is a myth rather than a historical event and therefore original exhibits are extremely rare. A handwritten note with the Song of the Nibelungs could hardly fill a whole museum. Additionally problematic passages in the history of the Nibelungen could be overcome with the help of distant comments but this was not in the interest of the founders. The concept of new media artist Oliver Auber and the architect Bernd Hoge gives visitors insight into the medieval myth with the help of a fictional portrayal, in contrast to the old fortification.

A myth is not a holistic phenomenon. Not a single, external perspective could describe it objectively. [That is why the Nibelungen Museum] is not a traditional, scientific museum, but rather an artistic creation. It provides an overview [of interpretations formed over centuries] and adds another.

-The Founders A+H, Die Bleibe des unbekannten Dichters

== Themed rooms ==
The initial spatial concept contained three rooms with dedicated to different concepts: the Tower of Visions, the Audio tower and the treasure room. The underground treasure room has been closed in 2007, due to technical reasons. Since 2008, the room contains the so-called laboratory of myths, in which visitors can once again recap their museum tour. The laboratory of myths is barrier-free. Especially visitors with health issues, who are not able to participate in the audio tour through the upper towers, can view the guided tour via monitors. With its different media techniques and a big screen, the room can be used by groups for educational purposes.

=== The Tower of Vision ===
In the Tower of Vision the visitors are presented to the main aspects of the saga, including its origins and historical context. At the same time it also traces the history of reception, which ranges from mythification to the declaration of the saga as a “national myth”. The narrator helps to “record the invisible threads, which during all the centuries linked together” [translated from German]. The Tower of Vision is installed in one of the medieval defense towers and is dominated by a high, oscillating iron pendulum in the form of a spindle, around which the spiral stairs are arranged. Glowing pictures are attached to the ribs of the sparkling, golden spindle, representing the “Rütlin” (little rod), which is the talisman of the Nibelungen treasure.

=== The Audio Tower ===
The Audio Tower is laid out as the scriptorium of the narrator. Here, visitors can sit on audio chairs and listen to passages from the original song, spoken in Middle High German and translated simultaneously. Visitors also learn about the contemporary everyday culture and high culture, which have influenced the author of the Song of The Nibelungs. Pictures, which visitors could also see in the Tower of Vision function as illustrations of the text passages and are now explained in more detail.

=== The Myth Lab ===
The “Myth Lab”, which is located in an underground room, provides visitors with the opportunity for quiet contemplation after the two-hour tour through the museum. The entire text by the anonymous poet can be accessed again here, and the Rütelin, a 17,5m column of pictures located in the Tower of Vision, is graphically depicted and can be viewed from all sides and angles. An internet search function is provided for student groups to research information for presentations or the like, and several flash movies and short documentaries can also be found there. The documentaries deal with the themes of Worms, modern and classic myths, and the Nibelungenlied. In addition, a “master terminal” and a ceiling projector provide presenters with the option of adding and presenting their own content.

The “myth lab” is also used for varying special presentations.

== Reception ==
Before the official opening of the museum the “virtual treasure” was presented on two symposia in Paris in 2000, as well as in Boston in 2001. The invitations for both symposia were sent by the Goethe Institute and the two events encountered a huge media response in France, Canada, the United States and Japan:

"A high-tech, cutting-edge interpretation of the Nibelungen myth…" Boston Digital Industry: Treasure of the Nibelungs (May 2001)

"Au-delà de la performance technique qui sait se faire oublier, les auteurs ont réussi une œuvre d'une grande poésie…" Libération: Tragédies en sous-sol (December 8, 2000)

"Sitôt que l'on y entre, en sentira son rhythme, sa joie ou ses tourments." Le Devoir: Un trésor virtuel sous la ville (January 20, 2001)

The official opening of the museum was also regarded as a success by a number of nationwide media:

"In the new Nibelungen Museum Worms the nebulous story is visualized. Thousands of pictures, texts and sounds result in a fantastic image of the medieval heroic epic." Frankfurter Rundschau (August 11, 2001)

"… a testimony deserving attention." Frankfurter Rundschau (August 21, 2001)

"The Nibelungenmuseum Worms virtually revives a piece of German world literature." Süddeutsche Zeitung, (August 20, 2001)

== Project team ==
- Olivier Auber (A+H): content design, museum & treasure
- Bernd Hoge (A+H): architecture & exhibition
- Thierry Fournier: Music, sound composition & audio editing
- Emmanuel Mâa Berriet: Real time VR program (picture)
- Joachim Heinzle and Olivier Auber: narrator's text
- Ursula Kraft: visual composition 'Rütelin'
- Susanne Wernsing: Iconography & theme research

== Controversy about the Treasure ==
Up to 2007, there was a virtual “Treasure Chamber” in the museum's “Myth Lab” – a real time projection of pictures of the treasure of the Nibelungs and the city of Worms with its buildings and monuments. Beneath the chamber, the museum built the “Worldground” (Weltengrund), where new pictures and sounds were produced constantly. The pictures and structures that created the “Worldground” refer to the idea of the Poietic Generator by Olivier Auber. The management removed the installation without informing the artist.
