= Johann Nikolaus Götz =

German poet (1721-1781)

Johann Gotz
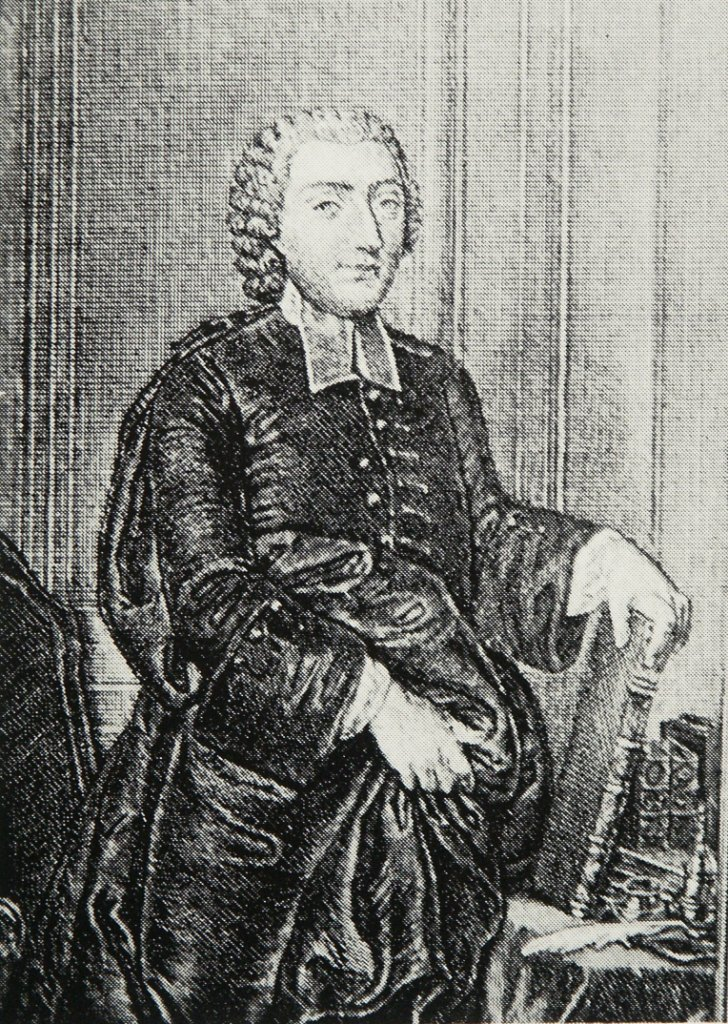
- Born: 9 July 1721; Worms, Prince-Bishopric of Worms
- Died: 4 November 1781 (aged 60); Winterburg
- Writing career
- Literary movement: Rococo

Johann Nikolaus Götz (July 9, 1721 – November 4, 1781) was a German poet from Worms.

== Biography ==
Götz was born in Worms. He studied theology at Halle (1739–1742), where he became intimate with the poets Johann W. L. Gleim and Johann Peter Uz, acted for some years as military chaplain, and afterwards filled various other ecclesiastical offices. He died in Winterburg, near Bad Kreuznach.

== Works ==
Haydn Die Harmonie in der Ehe HobXXVc3

The writings of Götz consist of a number of short lyrics and several translations, of which a rendering of Anacreon is notable. His original compositions are light, lively and sparkling, and are animated rather by French wit than by German depth of sentiment. The best known of his poems is Die Mädcheninsel, an elegy which met with the warm approval of Frederick the Great. Other works were Thamire an die Rosen and An eine Romansleserin.

Götz's Vermischte Gedichte were published with biography by K. W. Ramler (Mannheim, 1785; new ed., 1807), and a collection of his poems, dating from the years 1745–1765, was edited by C. Schüddekopf in the Deutsche Literaturdenkmale des 18. und 19. Jahrhunderts (1893). See also Briefe von und an J. N. Götz, edited by C. Schüddekopf (1893).
