= Wormser =

Wormser is a surname associated with Worms, Germany. Notable people with the surname include:

- André Wormser (1851–1926), French banker and Romantic composer
- Baron Wormser (born 1948), American poet
- Felix Wormser (died 1981), American engineer and government official
- Frances Dewey Wormser (1903–2008), American actress, entertainer, and vaudeville performer
- Lewis Wormser Harris (1812-1876), bill-broker, financier, member of Dublin Corporation, and member of the Dublin Hebrew Congregation
- Paul Wormser (1905–1944), French fencer
- Richard Wormser (1908–1977), American writer
- Sekl Loeb Wormser (1768-1846), German rabbi

== See also ==
- Wormser Dom
