= Jewish Cemetery, Worms =

Historic cemetery in Germany

Jewish Cemetery
- Heiliger Sand
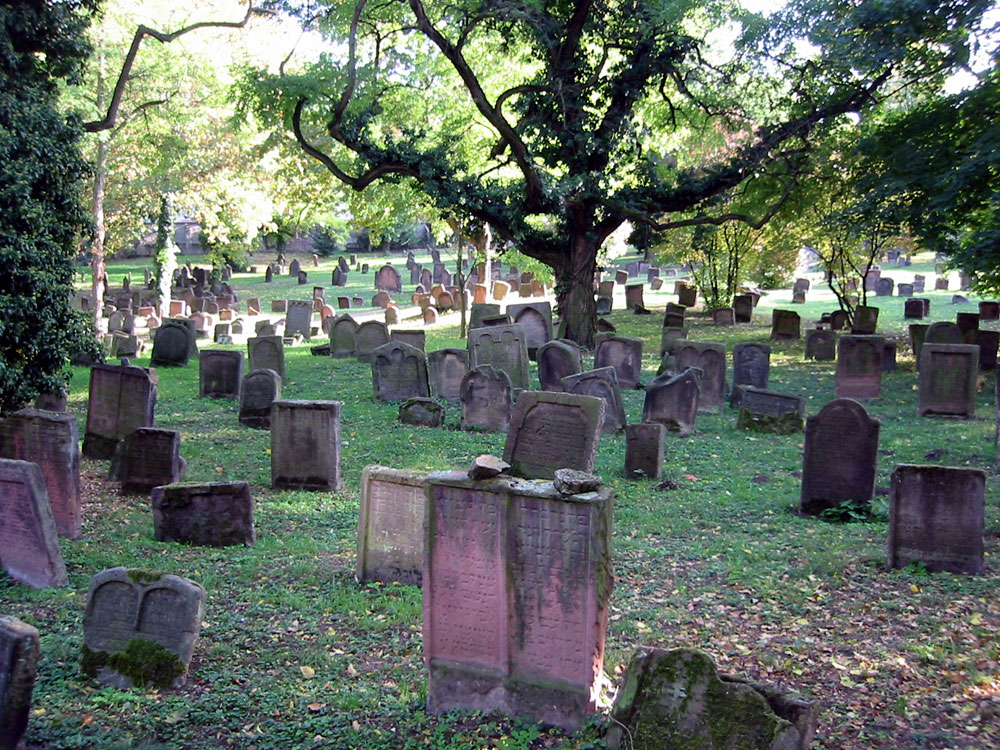
- Heiliger Sand
- Interactive map of Jewish Cemetery

Details
- Location: Worms, Germany
- Country: Germany
- Coordinates: 49°37′47″N 8°21′20″E
- Website: Official website

UNESCO World Heritage Site
- Part of: ShUM Sites of Speyer, Worms and Mainz
- Criteria: Cultural: (ii), (ii), (vi)
- Reference: 1636
- Inscription: 2021 (44th Session)

The Jewish Cemetery in Worms or Heiliger Sand, in Worms, Germany, is usually called the oldest surviving Jewish cemetery in Europe, although the Jewish burials in the Jewish sections of the Roman catacombs predate it by a millennium. The Jewish community of Worms was established by the early eleventh century, and the oldest tombstone still legible dates from 1058/59. The cemetery was closed in 1911, when a new cemetery was inaugurated. Some family burials continued until the late 1930s. The older part still contains about 1,300 tombstones, while the newer part (on the wall of the former city fortifications, acquired after 1689) contains more than 1,200. The cemetery is protected and cared for by the city of Worms, the Jewish community of Mainz-Worms, and the Landesdenkmalamt of Rhineland-Palatinate. The Salomon L. Steinheim-Institute for German-Jewish History at the University of Duisburg-Essen has been documenting and researching the site since 2005. Because of its cultural importance and preservation, the Jewish Cemetery (along with other medieval Jewish sites in Worms, Speyer, and Mainz) was inscribed on the UNESCO World Heritage List in 2021.

== Geography ==
The Heiliger Sand extends over an approximately triangular area of about 1.6 hectares. It was originally located southwest of the high medieval wall of the city of Worms. When in the 14th century a second rampart was built around Worms, it lay between the two fortifications. The number of gravestones is estimated at about 2500.

Due to the growth of the city in the second half of the 19th century the cemetery is today located at the edge of the city center, bordered by the Mainz–Ludwigshafen railway to the west, the Willy-Brandt-Ring to the east and the Andreasstraße to the north.

=== History of development ===
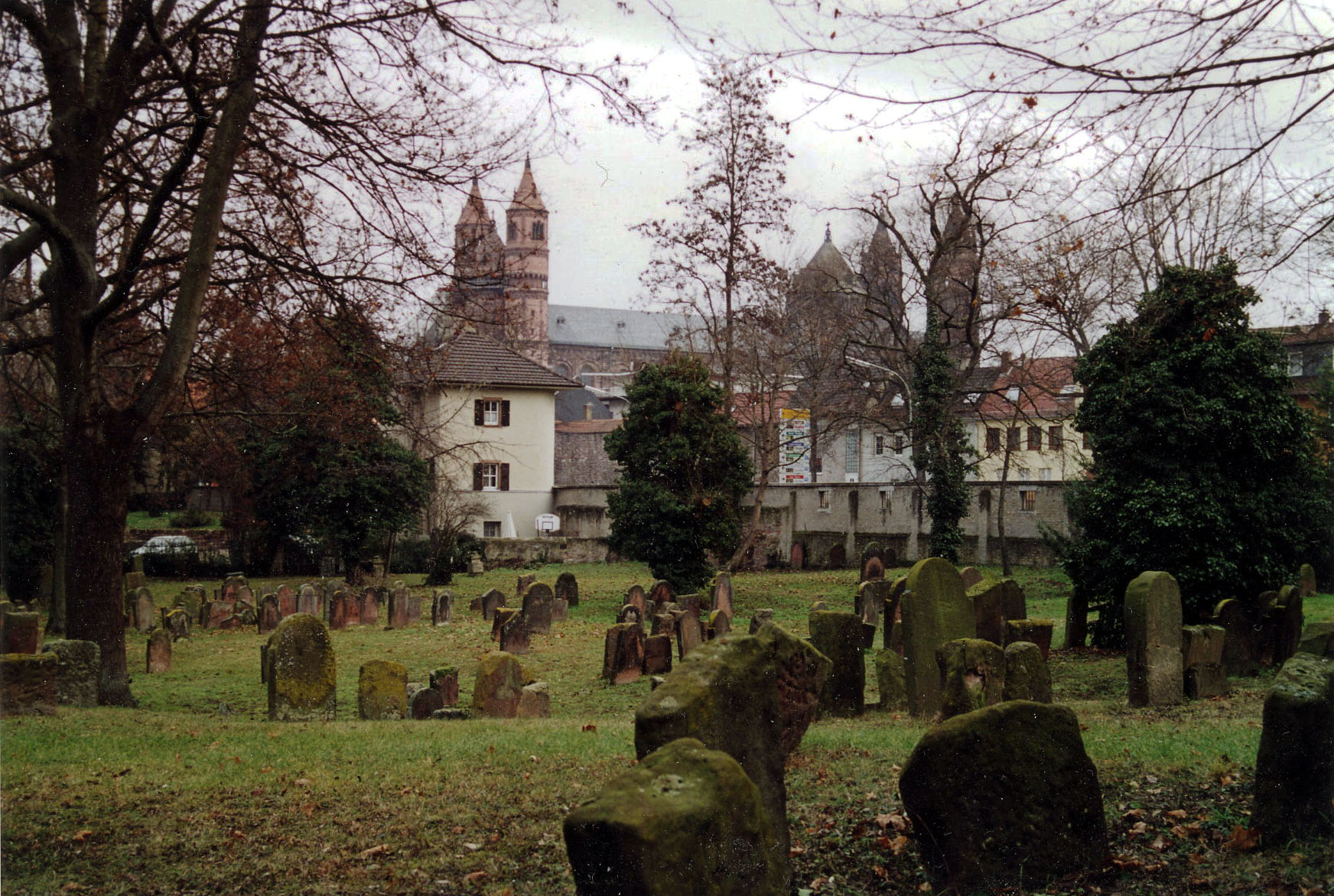
View of Worms Cathedral from the cemetery, known as the Martin Buber view. Buber wrote of this view, reflecting on the ties between God and the Jews and between Jewry and Christendom.

The oldest preserved gravestones date back to the 11th century. It is not known whether they document the beginning of the occupation of the cemetery or whether it is even older, even though there have been speculations about this time and again. On the oldest preserved gravestone the name of the buried – in any case it is a male person – can no longer be read due to damage. According to today's knowledge it dates from the year 1058/59. For a long time, the gravestone of Jakob haBachur from 1076/77 was considered the oldest.

Around 1260 the cemetery was given a solid wall as a fence. In the 15th or 16th century, as part of the new outer fortification, an underground passageway was dug through the cemetery, which connected the inner and outer Andrea Gate, and during its construction many of the gravestones of the cemetery were also walled up. The passage was 36 metres (118 ft) long, 1.50 metres (4 ft 11 in) high and 80 centimetres (31 in) wide. It was excavated in 1930 and the gravestones were recovered. On other occasions, too, gravestones have been stolen.

The route of the funeral processions led around half the city, from the north-east corner, where the Jewish quarter was located, around the inner wall to the south-west of the city, to the cemetery. Since the late Middle Ages, the noble family Dalberg had the right and the duty to protect the funeral processions on the way from the Jewish quarter to the Jewish cemetery. The Jewish community paid a fee for the protection of the Jews, which at the end of the 15th century amounted to 80 Malter. Korn amounted. There is a legendary story about the origin of this convoy, which was handed down by Juspa Schammes. According to it – at least in the 17th century – always two officials of the Dalbergs went with the funeral procession.

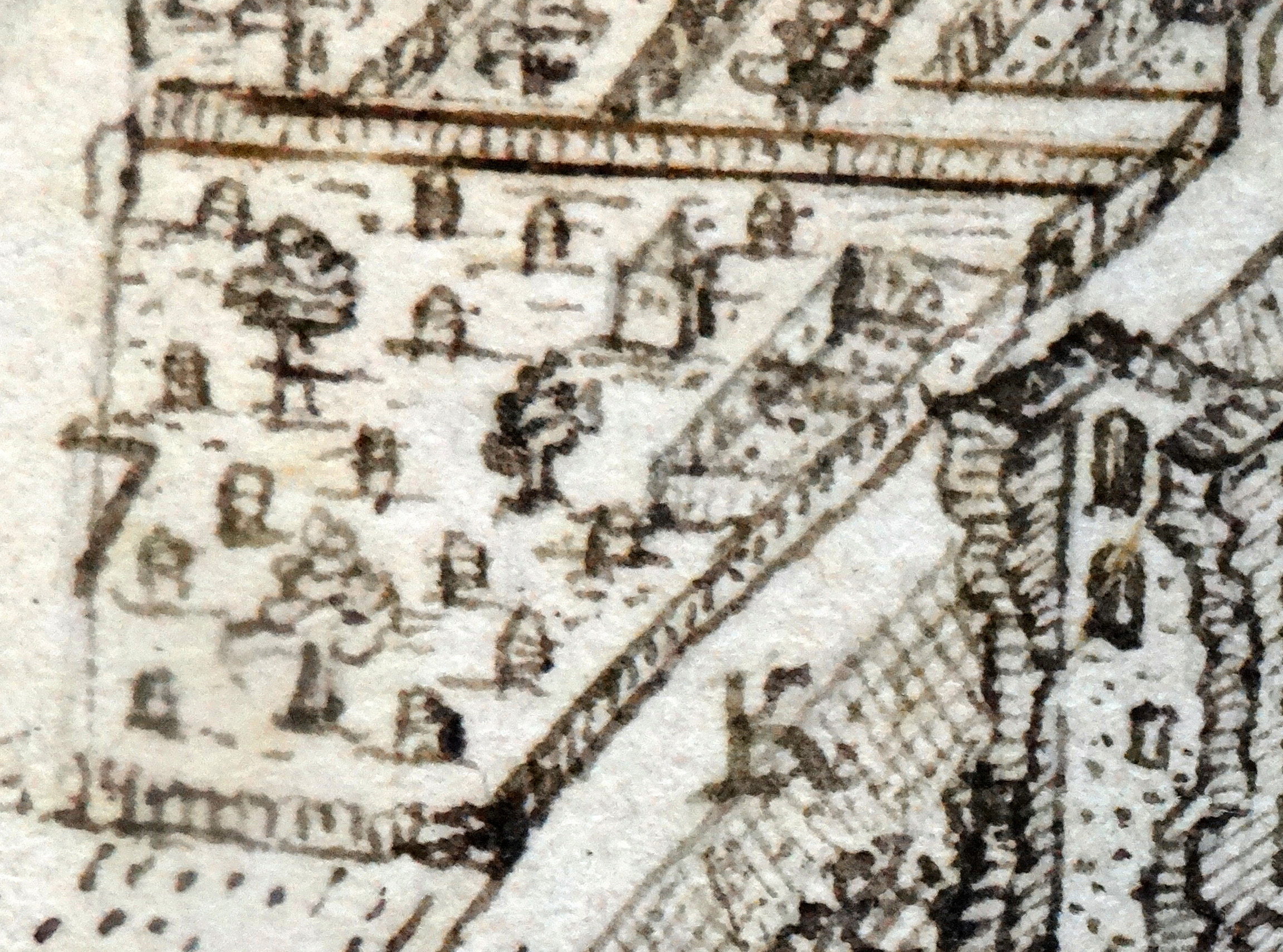
The cemetery shortly after the destruction of the city in 1689; on the right in the picture the damaged tower "Luginsland" of the inner city wall

Also during the pogrom of 1615 the cemetery was the target of vandalism: gravestones were knocked over and damaged. The congregation was weakened by the pogrom and in 1618 the Thirty Years' War broke out. In 1620 the southwest corner of the town fortification was reinforced, whereby two-thirds of the cemetery area is said to have been covered by sconce. After this intervention a comprehensive restoration of the cemetery was done in 1625, which David Oppenheim donated, which he also did during the reconstruction of the Worms Synagogue, which was severely damaged in 1615. At that time the entrance area of the cemetery got the entrance gate which is still preserved today as well as the Taharahaus. In addition the enclosure wall was renovated. But already in 1661 it was damaged again.

In the 18th and 19th centuries, the new cemetery section on the higher ground was the most frequently documented. This part is a remnant of the outer city fortification, which was destroyed by troops of King Louis XIV in 1689 during the Nine Years' War. In the 19th century the gravestones stylistically resembled those of Christian cemeteries, inscriptions were now often written bilingually: Hebrew and German.

In 1902 the city of Worms opened the new main cemetery Hochheimer Höhe. In 1911, immediately afterwards, a new Jewish cemetery was established, since the "Heilige Sand" no longer had any space and could not be expanded due to the renovation.

The final burial took place during the Holocaust in 1940. The cemetery remains a destination for Jewish visitors from around the world.

== Notable people buried at the cemetery ==
- Yaakov ben Moshe Levi Moelin (Maharil)
- Meir of Rothenburg (Maharam Rothenburg) buried together with Alexander ben Salomo Wimpfen
- Rabbi Jakob ben Moses halevi
- Yair Bacharach
- Moses Samson Bacharach

== Gallery ==
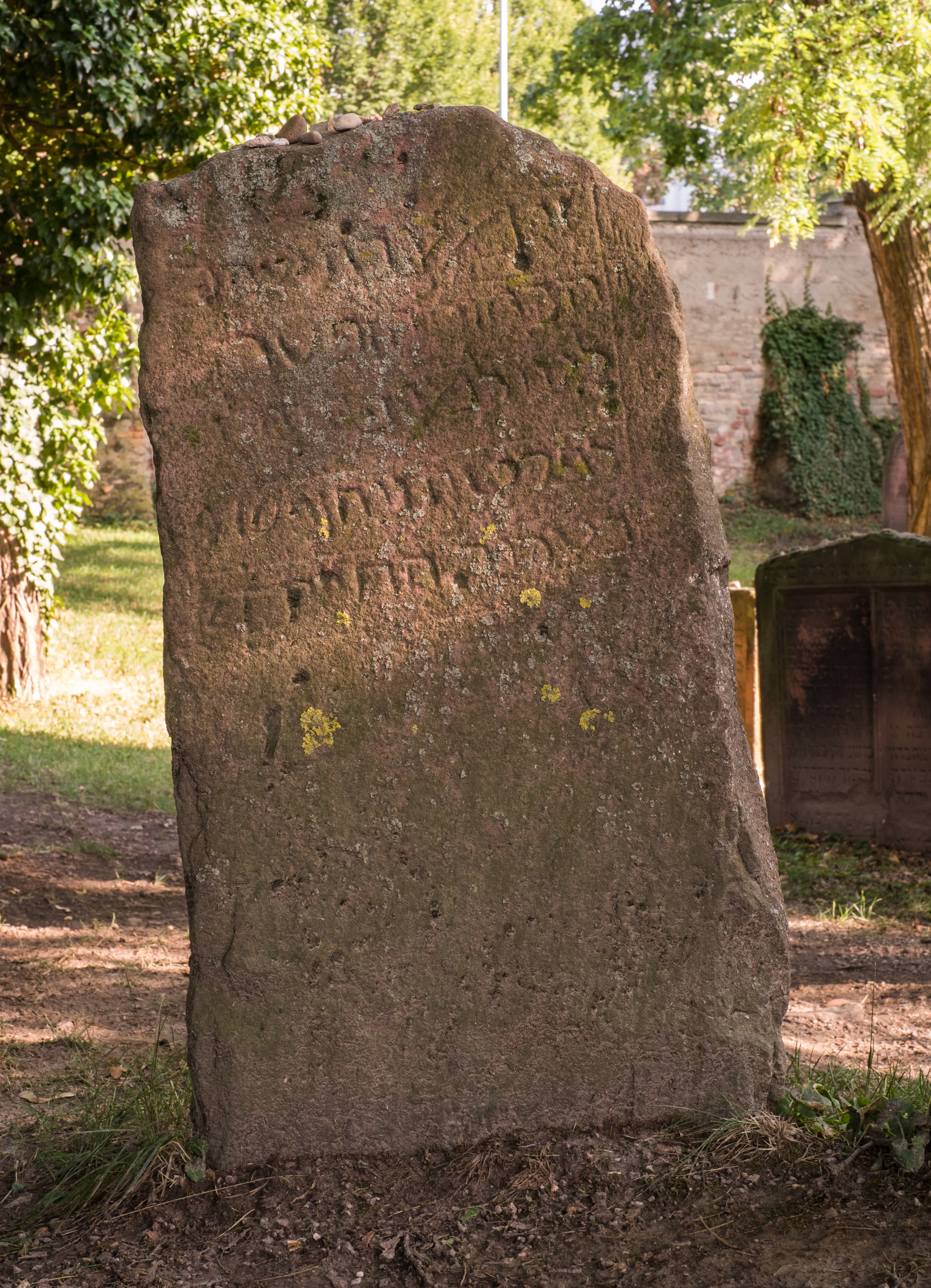
Gravestone dated 1076/1077: Yaakov ha-bahur

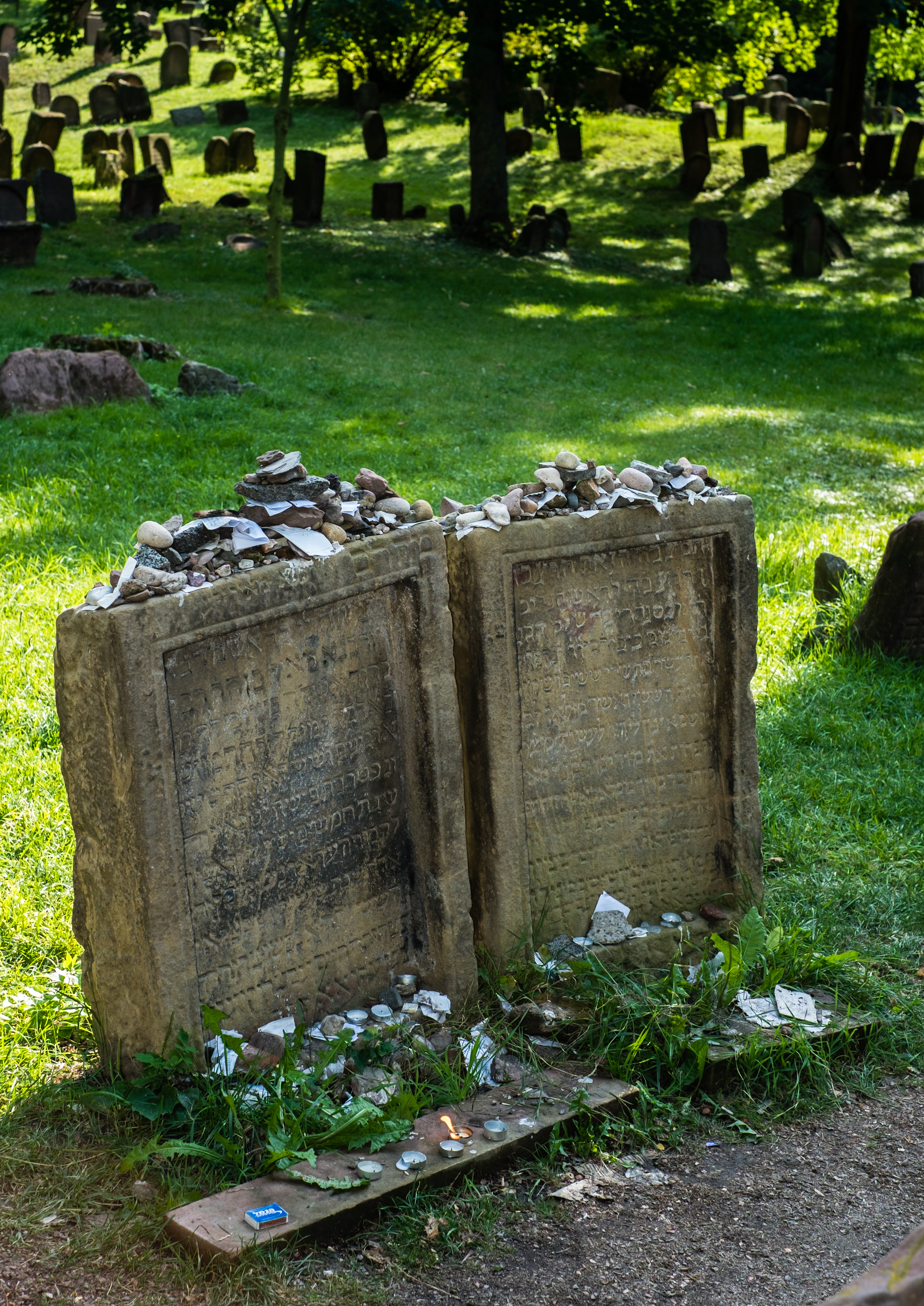
Gravestones of Rabbi Meir of Rothenburg (left) and Alexander ben Salomo Wimpfen

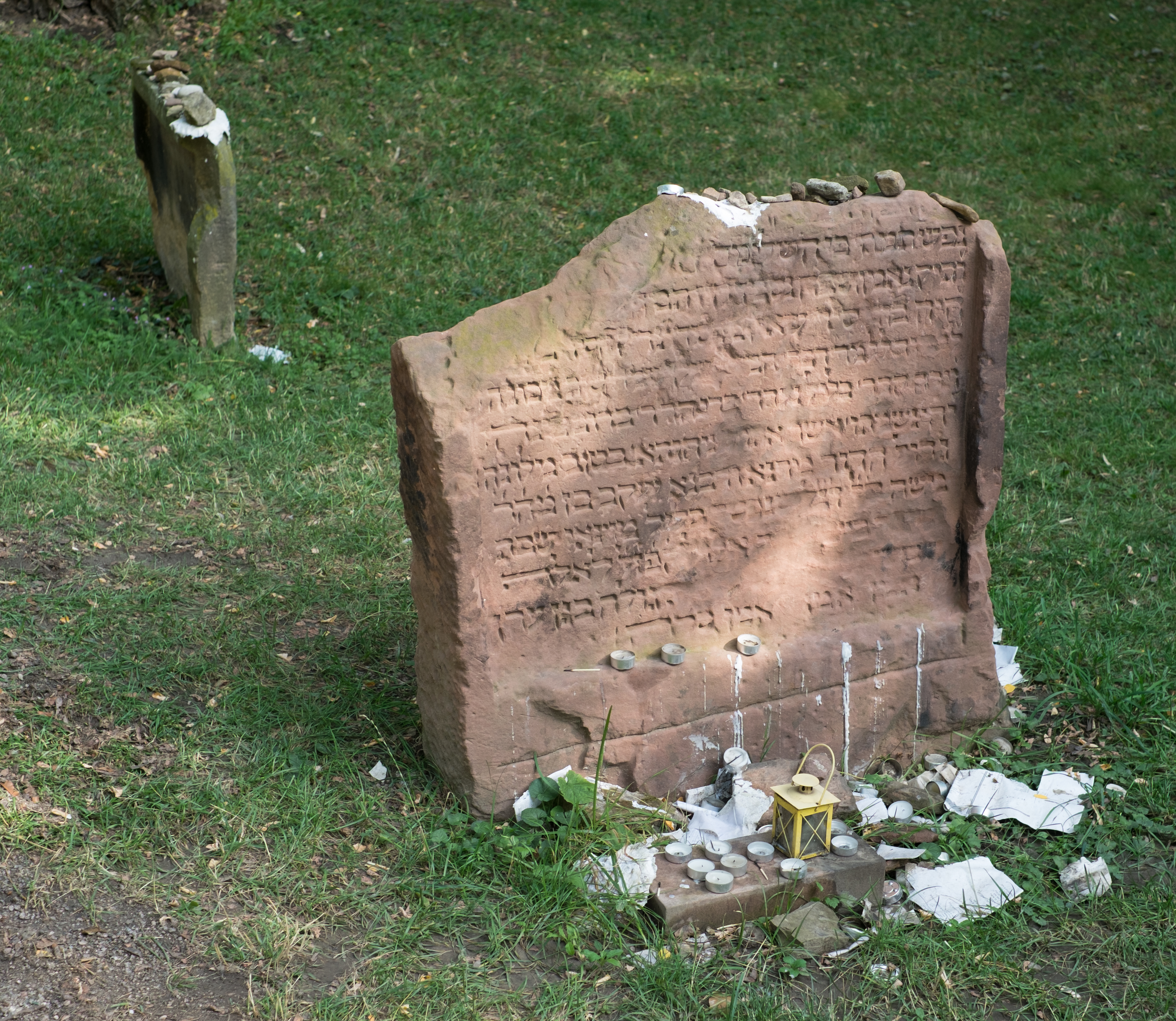
Grave of Yaakov ben Moshe Levi Moelin, also known as Maharil

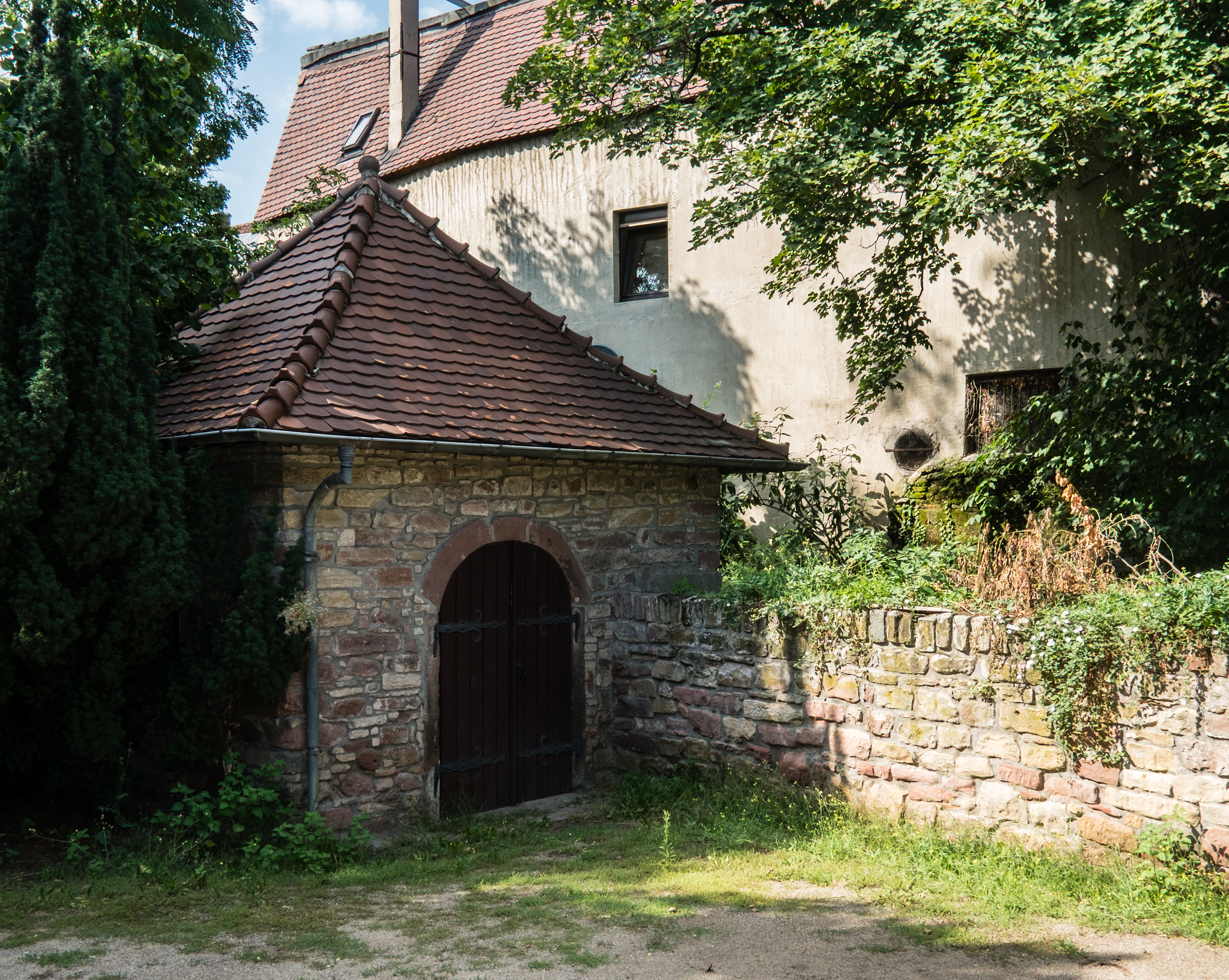
Mortuary

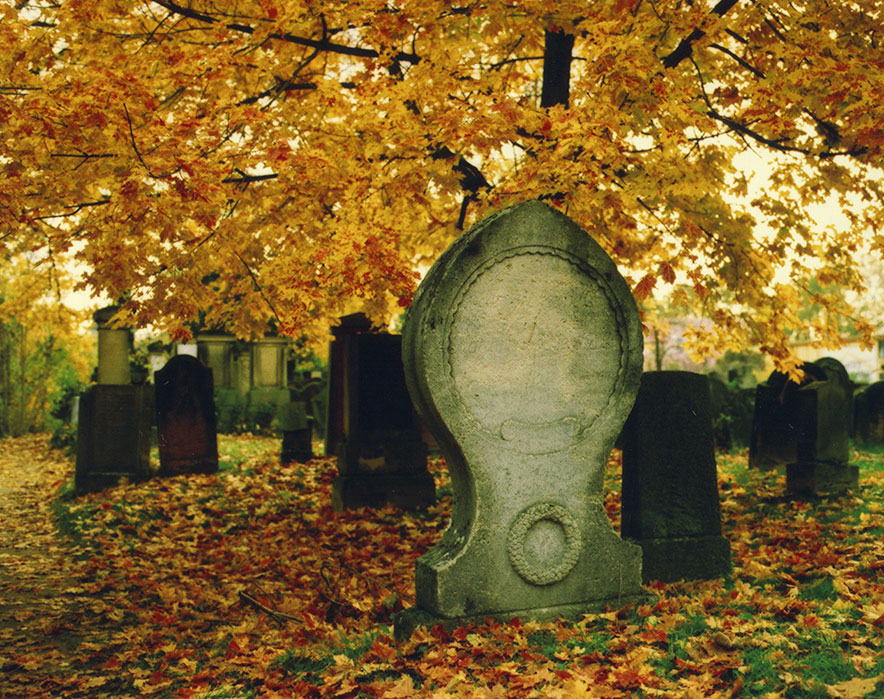
Cemetery in 2012

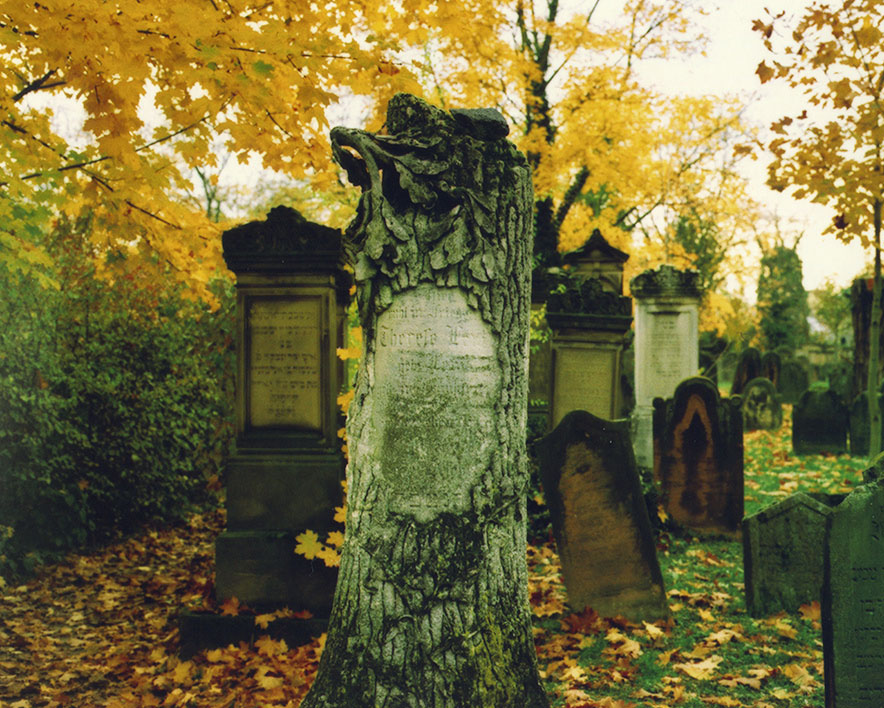
Cemetery in 2012, showing various styles of headstone

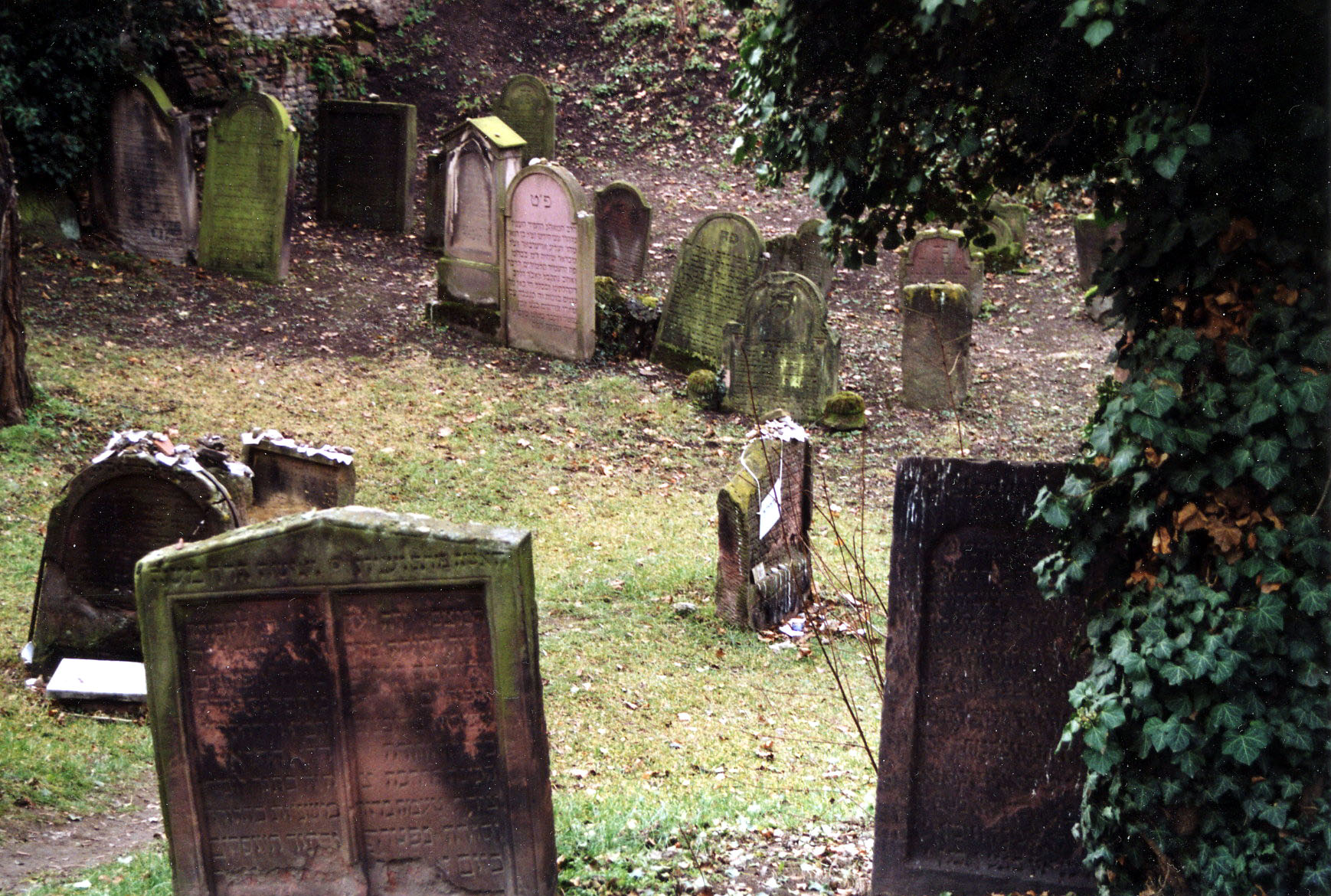
The Rabbinental ("Vale of the Rabbis") in the cemetery

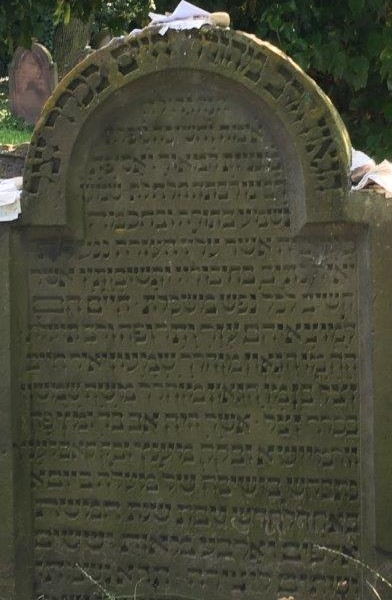
The tombstone of Rabbi Yair Chaim Bacharach, who served as the Chief Rabbi of Worms between 1699–1702
