= Tóc Tiên =

Vietnamese singer (born 1989)

- Tiên in 2026

Background information
- Born: Nguyễn Khoa Tóc Tiên; 13 May 1989 (age 37); Ho Chi Minh City, Vietnam
- Education: California State University, Long Beach
- Genre: V-pop
- Occupations: Singer; dancer; actress
- Instrument: Vocals
- Years active: 1996–
- Label: Thúy Nga
- Spouse: Hoàng Touliver (m. 2020; div. 2026)

Nguyễn Khoa Tóc Tiên (Vietnamese: [tɐwk͡p̚˧ˀ˦ tiɜŋ˧]; born 13 May 1989), known simply as Tóc Tiên, is a Vietnamese singer.

Beginning her career as a child, Tiên later became a teen idol, participating in several singing competitions and releasing two studio albums: Nụ cười nắng mai (2007) and Tóc Tiên thiếu nữ (2008). Her third solo album, My Turn (2009), projects a new, sexually charged image which she adopted while living in the United States and performing frequently on Thúy Nga Productions' variety show, Paris by Night. Tiên appeared in the first season of the television series, The Remix, in 2015. The show gave her an opportunity to perform "Ngày mai (Vũ điệu cồng chiêng)", the song which brought her success and later became one of her signature hits. Subsequent singles, notably "Em không là duy nhất" and "#Catena (Có ai thương em như anh)", were moderately successful.

Tiên made her film debut in Già giân, mỹ nhân và găng tơ (2015) and has signed numerous endorsement deals. On television, she hosted Bài hát Việt in 2008 and was a judge on The Voice of Vietnam and Vietnam Idol Kids. Her accolades include three Làn Sóng Xanh Awards, two Yan Vpop 20 Awards, an Mnet Asian Music Award, a Zing Music Award, an LGBT Appreciation Award and a Vietnamese Elle Style Award.

Tiên participated in the reality music show Chị đẹp đạp gió rẽ sóng (Sisters Who Make Waves/Ride the Wind) (Season 2) in 2024 with 29 other female artists, where her group became the finalists ("Hoa đạp gió"), and she became the group leader.

She represented Vietnam in the Eurovision Song Contest Asia 2026 in Bangkok, Thailand with the song "Em Tiên" and finished 3rd with 164 points.

== Early life and career ==
=== Family ===
Nguyễn Khoa Tóc Tiên was born in a Catholic family, to Kim Loan, a former ballet dancer and aerobics instructor, and Nguyễn Trung Kiên, a businessman, and raised in Ho Chi Minh City, Vietnam. Her family focused on education for generations and employed a strict parenting style, particularly her mother. Tiên has defended her mother's strictness, saying that she was protecting her from the risks of entering show business at an early age. The singer has two younger brothers, one of whom received a President's Education Award in 2015.

=== 1989–2008: Childhood and early career ===
Tiên was four when her family discovered her singing ability and allowed her to join the performing group of the Children's House of Ho Chi Minh City. She began booking singing and modeling jobs, appearing in several music videos while being managed by her mother. For her first singing competition Đi tìm Ngôi sao Close-Up at the age of 13, she claimed she was 18 to meet their entry requirements. After she was one of the show's twelve finalists, Tiên supported musician Thế Hiến on his 2002 nationwide Đợi chờ trong cơn mưa concert tour, which marked her debut as an adult singer.

In September 2003, Tiên signed up for the music competition Yo! Cùng ước mơ xanh and added two years to her age. The show ended with four winners—Tóc Tiên, Nam Cường, Minh Thư and Viết Thanh—joining a short-lived group, Yo! Band; its members later went on to have solo careers. Tiên began studying biology at Lê Hồng Phong High School, one of Vietnam's most prestigious high schools, in 2004. Although her grades were generally good until her graduation in 2007, they sometimes suffered due to her work schedule. The singer took vocal lessons at the city's conservatory and played for her district's volleyball team.

She was the Most Notable Face in Người đẹp qua ảnh, a 2005 Fujifilm modeling contest, and was recognized for songs such as "Tuổi teen tóc mây", "Rock học trò" and "Cô bé tóc xù". Tiên made her acting debut when she was the first actress to portray doctor Đặng Thùy Trâm for a segment aired on the VTV3 talk show Người đương thời. She later participated in Tiếng hát truyền hình toàn quốc giải Sao Mai, her third singing competition; this surprised many since Tiên was an established performer at the time. "I came to the competition to prove myself, not to test my abilities," she said. One of eighteen Southern finalists, Tiên sang Đỗ Bảo's "Bài hát cho em" on 19 November 2005, live show but lost.

Tiên contributed vocals to two tracks on Quốc Bảo's 2006 album V, including "Chung thân", the song that was later included in Ngọc Hiệp-directed short film Con rối. During an interview, the singer announced that an album was in the works and she would take a year off from singing to prepare for the national university-entrance examination. Tiên said several times that she wanted to be a doctor, with her singing career a "side job". Her mother scheduled the album's recording for the summer to ensure that her daughter could focus on studying. The singer released her debut album, Nụ cười nắng mai, in February 2007. After the July examination, Tiên was not admitted to her first-choice school, Ho Chi Minh City Medicine and Pharmacy University's Faculty of Medicine, and opted for the university's Faculty of Traditional Medicine.

In May 2008, Tiên began co-hosting the fourth season of Bài hát Việt with Anh Tuấn and Lại Văn Sâm. Quốc Bảo, Phương Uyên and other songwriters were enlisted for her second album, Tóc Tiên thiếu nữ, which was scheduled for release in June. Tiên undertook her first high-school tour Tóc Tiên và những giấc mơ in September, traveling to six schools in Ho Chi Minh City, Đồng Nai Province and Hanoi. In a 2014 interview for Elle Man Vietnam, Tóc Tiên stated that her childhood was "definitely different from [her] peers." She added: "Besides the pressuring study at school, I was following a singing career, I had to do photoshoots, interviews, etc. When my friends were having their days off, I was taking advantage of my time to do homework backstage at concerts or film studios."

=== 2009–2014: Paris by Night and career in the United States ===
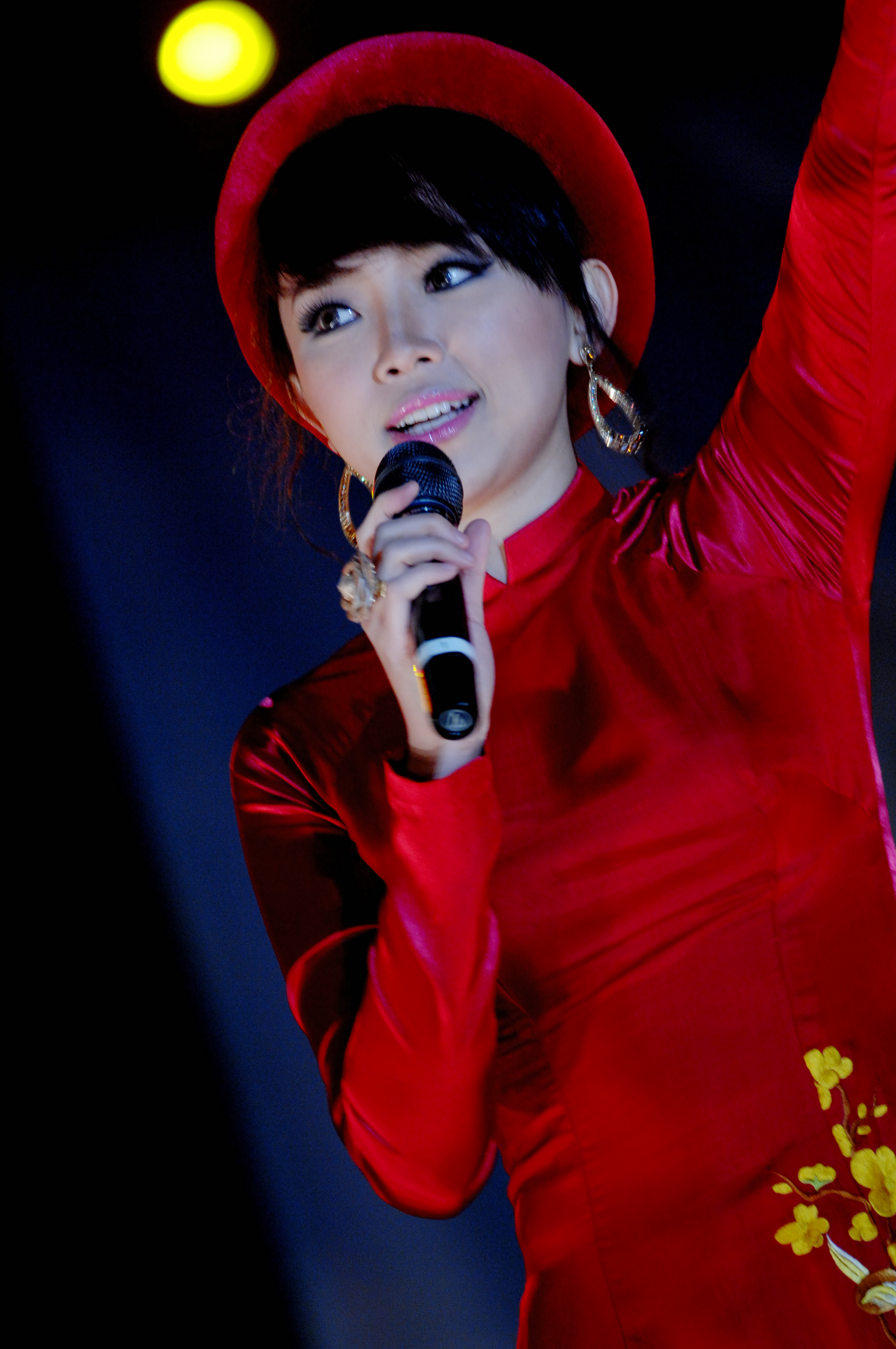
Tóc Tiên (2011)

Early in 2011, Tiên rushed to finish a collaborative album with her long-time friend, singer Wanbi Tuấn Anh, before moving with her family to Los Angeles in March. Chuyện tình vượt thời gian, a collection of their past and new collaborations, was released in June. A concert promoting the album was planned then canceled. Tiên had begun her undergraduate studies at Pasadena City College, majoring in biology, and intended to obtain a Bachelor of Science degree to study medicine at the University of California, Los Angeles. When she arrived in Los Angeles, she signed a contract with Thúy Nga Productions, a US-based record label which managed many overseas Vietnamese artists. By 2016, Tiên had appeared on more than forty episodes of Thúy Nga's direct-to-video variety series Paris by Night (PBN), starting with her performance of "Tóc Mây" on the 96th installment in June 2009. After taking a break from Paris by Night to focus on her career in Vietnam, she later comes back to perform on this program in Singapore in 2019 (PBN 130), and in Bangkok, Thailand in 2022 (PBN 134) and 2023 (PBN 136).

She sang part-time to finance her education, performing in clubs and casinos across the US. In September 2010, Tiên made a cameo appearance on Wanbi Tuấn Anh's music video for "Bắt sóng cảm xúc" and was featured on the song's R&B remix. Her third solo studio album My Turn was released in August 2011, and includes contributions from Dương Khắc Linh, Nguyễn Hải Phong, Thanh Bùi and others. In May 2012, music videos for three album tracks and her Paris by Night performances were included on the compilation video release The Best of Tóc Tiên. After a number of collaborations with Mai Tiến Dũng on the variety series, their joint album Mystical Night was released in August. In July 2013, Tiên reported that she had transferred to California State University, Long Beach and changed her major to communication studies to balance her education and career; however, she eventually dropped out.

=== 2015–2020: Vietnam comeback, breakthrough, and television endeavors ===
In October 2014, Tiên planned a few projects to rebuild her career in Vietnam, but hesitated over whether or not to stay permanently. This was followed by the release of two singles, "Tell Me Why" in November and "Ngày mai" in February 2015, with the former's video causing controversy over its provocative nature. She joined the cast of music competition The Remix in December, despite initially rejecting the offer. TeamV—which consists of Tiên and producers Touliver and Long Halo—would go against other notable acts such as Sơn Tùng M-TP and Đông Nhi, to create the best remix work on the program. In April, her performance of "Ngày mai" on the fourth live show was a success. The song's new mix with the choreography, both named "Vũ điệu cồng chiêng", immediately went viral. It was awarded a 2015 Pops Award for Most Covered Music Video, a nomination for Song of the Year at the 2015 Làn Sóng Xanh Awards, a nomination for Music Video of the Year at the 2015 Dedication Music Awards, a 2016 Zing Music Award for Most Favorite Dance/Electronic Song, and the annual Top Hit title from television show Vietnam Top Hits. Many publications called the track her signature hit. Her team went on to debut other singles on the competition including "D.C.M.A. (Đâu cần một ai)" in June, which features BigDaddy and Andree, before finishing the show in fourth place.

The Remix season 1 performances and results
Show	Theme	Genre(s)	Song(s) choice	Result	Ref.
1	Free choice		"Angel"/"Faded"	Advanced	
2	"Non sông gấm vóc"	Trance	"Hoa cỏ mùa xuân"	Safe (2nd)	
3	"Cuộc sống mới, kỷ nguyên mới"	Rap, hip hop, dubstep, trap, R&B	"Em về tinh khôi"	Safe (2nd)	
4	"Hòa mình cùng âm nhạc"	House	"Ngày mai"	Safe (1st)	
5	"Dân gian"	World music	"Dạ cổ hoài lang" (with Thành Lộc)	Safe (2nd)	
6	"Sáng tác mới"	Free choice	"D.C.M.A. (Đâu cần một ai)" (with BigDaddy and Andree)	Safe (3rd)	
7	"Trở về quá khứ"	Disco, dance	"Em đẹp nhất đêm nay"	Safe (3rd)	
8	"Play Hard"	Heavy metal, electronic, bass	"Người đàn bà hóa đá"	Safe (2nd)	
9	"Ca khúc hit"	Free choice	"Đường cong"	Safe (3rd)	
10	Judges' choice		"Sao anh vẫn chờ"	Safe (4th)	
11	Free choice		"Thế giới không có anh"	Safe (4th)	
11	Free choice		"Chờ người nơi ấy" (with Giang Hồng Ngọc, Duy Anh and King Lady)	Safe (4th)	
Finale	Free choice		— (Note: Tóc Tiên didn't perform during the finale due to health issues, but she still attended in the audience.)	Bronze award (4th)	

In December 2015, Tiên starred in her first comedy film Già gân, mỹ nhân và găng tơ as Quỳnh Cherry, a DJ on the run from a group of gangsters. However, both the film and her performance received negative reviews from critics. In January 2016, she won Best Female Artist at the Yan Vpop 20 Awards and performed "I'm in Love" and "Big Girls Don't Cry". These two singles were from her then-upcoming extended play T. The album's lead track "The Beat of Celebration" featuring BigDaddy, JustaTee and Touliver, brought her the Silver Music Video and Most Effective Performer awards from Bài hát tôi yêu. With the Vietnamese dubbed–Kung Fu Panda 3, the singer voiced Mỹ Mỹ, a translated version of the original's animated character Mei Mei. In March, she recorded "Một con đường hai ngã rẽ" for the soundtrack of the comedy film Taxi, em tên gì?. Tiên later became a prominent judge on the first seasons of Tài năng DJ and Vietnam Idol Kids in May, following her guest judging appearances on various television series. She also appeared as guest mentor on four episodes of The Face Vietnam's first season and on its live finale aired in October. A string of musical releases served for Tóc Tiên's advertising campaigns were conducted afterwards. Dutch producer Afrojack and rap artist Suboi joined one of them, "Tâm điểm ánh nhìn (All Eyes on Us)", the trio's song for Budweiser released in December.

Early in 2017, the singer became a judge on the first season of Mặt nạ ngôi sao—the Vietnamese version of the Korean singing competition King of Mask Singer—and a coach on the fourth season of The Voice of Vietnam. Her team's contestant, Hiền Hồ, won the latter show's second place and appeared with her on a duet titled "Hôn" in June. Tiên also released a few other singles throughout the year, including: "Em không là duy nhất" in February, which was successful, "Walk Away" in May, and "Hôm nay tôi cô đơn quá", a collaboration with Rhymastic, in August. She was awarded a 2017 Mnet Asian Music Award for Best Asian Artist in Vietnam in November, and a V Live Award for Best Iconic Star in January 2018, and was also included in the top five most favorite singers at the Làn Sóng Xanh Awards for the third consecutive year. "Hôm nay tôi cô đơn quá" later received both Single and Song of the Year nominations at the Làn Sóng Xanh and Dedication Music Awards, respectively. Her singles, "Thì em vẫn thế" and "Phút giây tuyệt vời", were released in February and April 2018, respectively.

=== 2021–: Chị đẹp đạp gió, Show It All Vietnam, new singles and Eurovision Song Contest Asia ===
Tóc Tiên participated in the reality music show Chị đẹp đạp gió (Sisters Who Make Waves/Ride the Wind) (Season 2) in 2024 with 29 other female artists, where her group became the finalists ("Hoa đạp gió") and she became the group leader. In January 2025, Tóc Tiên was chosen by Riot Games to cover "Bite Marks" - a theme song for the League of Legends 2025 season. She is also one of the three main producers for the first season of Show It All Vietnam reality TV program from April 2025.

Tóc Tiên with the flag of Vietnam at the 2026 Eurovision Song Contest Asia in Bangkok.

Tóc Tiên organised her first fan-meeting "The 1st Fancon FANMEET-TIÊN 2025" in Gia Định Park Circus, Ho Chi Minh City. She also performed in significant concerts and festivals in Vietnam, including V Concert - Rạng rỡ Việt Nam (V Concert - Radiant Vietnam) to celebrate 80 years of the August Revolution and Vietnam National Day in Vietnam Exposition Center (VEC) in Đông Anh Ward, Hanoi, and Concert Quốc gia - Tổ quốc trong tim (National Concert - Homeland in Our Hearts) in August 2025 at Mỹ Đình National Stadium, Từ Liêm Ward, Hanoi. She is considered one of the most sought-after artists in Vietnam.

In early September 2026, it was announced that Tiên would represent Vietnam at the Eurovision Song Contest Asia 2026, with her song to be selected in October through the national selection show The Sound of Vietnam.

== Artistry and public image ==
From the start of her career, Tiên had a generally wholesome image as a teen idol. Quốc Bảo and Đỗ Bảo music along with pop jazz, blues and R&B were said to be her main inspirations. Nonetheless, she was better known for her teen pop sound with lyrics often having school-related imagery. The singer herself had expressed a wish to perform lyrically adult and mature songs, but her mother, who managed at the time, opposed the idea. In spite of this, her debut Nụ cười nắng mai still went for a more "grown-up" approach and was a departure from earlier works. Producer Quốc Bảo, who worked on her first two studio releases, chose R&B as the material's dominant influence and a new direction for her music. Her follow-up Chuyện tình vượt thời gian with Wanbi Tuấn Anh has the two performing and covering a handful of love songs, in genres such as blues jazz and alternative rock.

In the past, the singer was nicknamed "Cô bé tóc xù" by the press for her signature long and "frizzy" black hair. In March 2013, she changed her hairstyle to a pixie cut after a series of photoshoots and performances where she offered a more provocative image. Tiên later said that the hair cut was one of the "turning points" that helped her discover herself, while the image change was a "natural" progression, a result of her time working in the States. Her third solo album My Turn reflected this style both visually and musically at its early stage. After having worked with Touliver and Long Halo on The Remix, Tiên focused on electronic dance music later in her career. The trio's successful collaboration, "Ngày mai (Vũ điệu cồng chiêng)", was made famous by the chorus that infused house music with the use of drum and percussion, all creating a notable gong-like sound. Moreover, elements of trap were used in several productions of her subsequent singles.

Tiên has cited Beyoncé, Rihanna and Jolin Tsai as major influences on her showmanship. Stylistically, the singer has been described as a fashion icon and was compared many times to Miley Cyrus and Rihanna. Talking specifically about Cyrus, Tiên said she understood the comparisons because of the similarities between their starts as teen stars and their later reinventions moving into adulthood. In 2015, she was given a Vietnamese Elle Style Award for Most Stylish Upcoming Female Singer. Fashion brand Juno created a fall collection called Juno & Tóc Tiên in 2017, which was inspired by the singer's style. Aside from her deal with Juno, Tiên has accepted numerous brand endorsement offers and was dubbed as the "queen of endorsements". When she endorsed I-Mobile phones in 2008, the company purchased 11,000 physical copies of Tóc Tiên thiếu nữ to give away as gifts to phone buyers. Other brands that she has promoted include Pepsi, OPPO Electronics' smartphones, Toshiba, PNJSilver, Louis Vuitton, and Calvin Klein.

Tiên is a Christian and stated that her religious faith brought her back to her home country to rebuild her career. She is also a supporter of LGBT rights. She dedicated her performance of "Ngày mai" on The Remix and her single "Hôn" to the community. Comedians BB Trần and Tiko Tiến Công appeared in drag for her music video of "I'm in Love". The appearances created divided opinions, with some critics accusing the characters of disrespecting transgender people. For her work in support of the community, the singer was awarded the Most Influential Person Voted by the Public category at the LGBT Appreciation Awards in 2016. Also for the "I'm in Love" music video, Tiên invited female celebrities such Nguyễn Cao Kỳ Duyên and Tiên Tiên to make cameo appearances and show their support for feminism and against violence against women.

== Personal life ==
Tiên started dating basketball player Chong Paul in December 2007 after they met at a high school event. Despite their age gap (Tiên was 19 and Chong Paul was 27 when they first dated), her parents approved of the relationship, but only under strict monitoring. In July 2013, the singer confirmed that they had split up. Some articles have since linked her in a relationship with producer Touliver, but both have denied these claims. In 2017, Tiên referred to herself as "single".

In a letter Tiên penned to her mother in September 2013, she revealed the two have not spoken to each other since her switch from medical to communication studies, and that her image change made her mother "furious". The singer added that she did not want to be a doctor, as that was only her family's wish. Despite this, she expressed a desire to reconcile with her mother in many interviews and on social media, even claiming the strained relationship caused her to be depressed for a long period. When asked about the current state of their relationship in August 2017, Tiên replied saying she "didn't even know" if it would be fixed or not. "It's difficult to solve the conflicts [between me and my mother]. They're not just simply generation gap conflicts, they involved the ways of thinking from each individual. So to say if the problems have been solved, I'd say they haven't," she said.

Tiên married Hoàng Touliver on 20 February 2020, their wedding mass formally took place in Dalat Cathedral located in Đà Lạt. In 2026, Tóc Tiên announced that she and Hoàng Touliver had divorced due to personal reasons and agreed to maintain professional peer relationship.

== Discography ==
=== Studio album ===
- Nụ cười nắng mai (2007)
- Tóc Tiên thiếu nữ (2008)
- Chuyện tình vượt thời gian (2009) (with Wanbi Tuấn Anh)
- My Turn (2011)
- Mystical Night (2012) (with Mai Tiến Dũng)
- CONG (2022)

=== Extended plays ===
Title
Thanh Âm Việt Nam
Details
- Released: 20 September 2026
- Label: DAO Entertainment
- Formats: Digital download, streaming
Notes
- Track listing

#	Title	Length
1.	"a to A"	2:58
2.	"Em Tiên"	3:00
3.	"Follow me"	2:52
4.	"Khó Gì?"	2:58
5.	"Love Always Wins"	2:41
		14:29

=== Singles ===
==== As lead artist ====
Title	Year	Peak chart positions		Album
Title	Year	VIE	VIE Viet.	Album
"Đã Phai"	2011	*		My Turn
"My Turn"	2011	*		My Turn
"Bao Giờ Ta Lại Yêu"	2011	*		My Turn
"Tell Me Why"	2014	*		Non-album singles
"Ngày Mai"	2015	*		Non-album singles
"D.C.M.A" (featuring BigDaddy and Andree)	2015	*		Non-album singles
"Vũ Điệu Cồng Chiêng" ("Ngày Mai" reworked version)	2015	*		Non-album singles
"The Beat of Celebration" (featuring BigDaddy and JustaTee)	2015	*		T
"Big Girls Don't Cry"	2016	*		T
"Phụ Nữ Là Để Yêu (I'm In Love)"	2016	*		T
"Walk Away"	2017	*		Non-album singles
"Em Không Là Duy Nhất"	2017	*		Non-album singles
"Hôm Nay Tôi Cô Đơn Quá" (featuring Rhymastic)	2017	*		Non-album singles
"Thì Em Vẫn Thế"	2018	*		Non-album singles
"Phút Giây Tuyệt Vời"	2018	*		Non-album singles
"Có Ai Thương Em Như Anh"	2018	36	29	Non-album singles
"Không Ai Hơn Em Đâu Anh"	2019	*		Non-album singles
"Ngày Tận Thế" (featuring Da Lab and Touliver)	2020	*		Non-album singles
"Nơi Em Là Bình Yên" (featuring Binz)	2020	*		Non-album singles
"Em Đã Có Người Mới"	2021	29	19	Yêu Rồi Yêu Rồi Yêu
"Mình Yêu Đến Đây Thôi"	2021	*	95	Yêu Rồi Yêu Rồi Yêu
"Từ Những Thói Quen"	2022	—	—	Yêu Rồi Yêu Rồi Yêu
"Trên Chuyến Xe Lên Đà Lạt Chiều Nay"	2022	—	—	Yêu Rồi Yêu Rồi Yêu
"1 Cọng Tóc Mai" (featuring Touliver)	2022	59	40	Cong
"AmIClear?" (featuring Trong Hieu)	2022	—	—	Cong
"906090" (featuring Mew Amazing)	2022	31	15	Cong
"Like This Like That" (featuring Tlinh)	2023	—	—	Cong
"—" denotes a recording that did not chart or was not released in that territory. "*" denotes that the chart did not exist at that time.

=== Promotional singles ===
Title	Year	Album
"Santa Baby"	2015	Non-album singles
"Be Your Best Version" (with Touliver and JustaTee, featuring Hữu Vi}	2016	Non-album singles
"Tâm Điểm Ánh Nhìn" (featuring Suboi)	2017	Non-album singles
"Hôn" (featuring Hiền Hồ)	2017	Non-album singles
"Mọi Lúc Bên Anh"	2019	Non-album singles
"Xuống Phố Phải Tươi"	2019	Non-album singles
"Mãi Xuân Cùng Em" (with Mew Amazing)	2020	Non-album singles
"Việt Nam Tử Tế" (solo or with Lam Trường, Hoàng Thùy Linh, Erik and Karik)	2020	Non-album singles

=== Other charted songs ===
Title	Year	Peak chart positions	Album
Title	Year	VIE Viet.	Album
"Nếu Anh Là Em" (featuring Hứa Kim Tuyền)	2022	81	Cong

== Filmography ==
=== Film roles ===
Year	Title	Role	Notes	Ref.
2015	Già gân, mỹ nhân và găng tơ	Quỳnh Cherry		
2016	Kung Fu Panda 3	Mỹ Mỹ (voice)	Vietnamese dub	
2018	Bạn chỉ sống một lần	TBA	Post-production	
2022	Furies (Thanh Sói)	Thanh		

=== Television roles ===
Year	Title	Role	Notes	Ref.
2002	Đi tìm Ngôi sao Close-Up	Contestant		
2003	Yo! Cùng ước mơ xanh	Contestant		
2005	Người đương thời	Đặng Thùy Trâm	1 episode	
2005	Tiếng hát truyền hình toàn quốc giải Sao Mai	Contestant		
2008	Bài hát Việt	Co-host	8 episodes (season 4)	
2015–2017	The Remix	Contestant / Guest judge	13 episodes (season 1, 3)	
2015	Ai thông minh hơn học sinh lớp 5?	Contestant	Season 3, episode 3	
2015	Người bí ẩn	Guest judge	Season 2, episode 9	
2015	Tôi là... người chiến thắng	Guest judge	2 episodes (season 3)	
2015	Thử thách cùng bước nhảy	Guest judge	2 episodes (season 4)	
2015	Cười xuyên Việt: Phiên bản nghệ sĩ	Guest judge	Season 1, episode 2	
2016	Hội ngộ danh hài	Guest	Season 4, episode 3	
2016	Tài năng DJ	Judge	18 episodes (season 1)	
2016	Vietnam Idol Kids	Judge	12 episodes (season 1)	
2016	The Face Vietnam	Guest mentor	5 episodes (season 1)	
2016	Vietnam Idol	Guest judge	Season 7, episode 11	
2016	SV 2016	Guest judge	Finale	
2016	Giọng ải giọng ai	Guest artist	Season 1, episode 1	
2016	Khởi đầu ước mơ	Guest judge	Season 1, episode 3	
2017	Phiên bản hoàn hảo	Guest judge	Season 1, episode 1	
2017	Mặt nạ ngôi sao	Judge	14 episodes (season 1)	
2017–2018	The Voice of Vietnam	Coach	20 episodes (season 4–5)	
2019	Who is Single Vietnam	Guest advisor	Season 2, episode 1	
2019	Spring Waves 19	Guest		
2019	Running Man Vietnam	Guest	Season 1, episode 13	
2019	The Brain Vietnam	Judge	Season 1	
2020	The Brain Vietnam	Judge	Season 2	
2020	Who is Single Vietnam	Guest advisor	Season 3, episode 1	
2020	Hidden Voices	Khách mời	Season 5, episode 5	
2020	Teen All Stars School	Khách mời		
2020	Sóng 20	Khách mời		
2021	Sóng 21	Khách mời		
2021	Have a Sip	Khách mời	Episodes 49 and 64	
2021	Sàn đấu vũ đạo	Guest advisor	Season 1 Finale	
2022	The Masked Singer Vietnam	Judge	Season 1	
2022	Big Song Big Deal	Judge		
2023	Who is Single Vietnam	Guest advisor	Season 5, episode 1	
2023	The Masked Singer Vietnam	Judge	Season 2	
2024	Sisters Who Make Waves Vietnam	Group leader	Season 2	
2025	Show It All Vietnam	All-Powerful Producer - Survival Phase	Season 1	
2025	Haha Family	Guest - Đắk Lắk leg	Season 1, episodes 12 –15	
2025	Who is A.I.	Guest	Season 1, episode 4	

=== Music video appearances ===
Year	Title	Artist	Ref.
2010	"Bắt sóng cảm xúc"	Wanbi Tuấn Anh	
2015	"Sacota"	Touliver featuring BigDaddy	
2016	"Như vậy mãi thôi"	Noo Phước Thịnh	
2017	"Vì đời là thế mà"	Mai Tiến Dũng	
2018	"Dusted"	Mr.A featuring Touliver and Dustee	

== Tours and live performances ==
=== Headlining ===
- Tóc Tiên và những giấc mơ (2008)
- The 1st Fancon FANMEET-TIÊN 2025 in Ho Chi Minh City (2025)

=== Supporting act ===
- Đợi chờ trong cơn mưa (with Thế Hiển) (2002)

=== Paris by Night performances ===
No.	Song(s)	Musician(s)	Co-performers	Program No.	Year	Country
1	"Tóc Mây"	Phạm Thế Mỹ	solo	Paris By Night 96	2009	United States
2	"Có Không Dài Lâu"	Võ Hoài Phúc	Diễm Sương	Paris By Night 97	2009	United States
3	"Em Trong Mắt Tôi"	Nguyễn Đức Cường	solo	Paris By Night 99	2010	United States
4	"Làm Sao Giữ Được Anh"	Vĩnh Tâm	solo	Paris By Night Divas	2010	United States
5	"Tình Còn Đam Mê"	Võ Hoài Phúc	Như Loan	Paris By Night 100	2010	United States
6	"Ngày Tết Việt Nam"	Hoài An	Kỳ Phương Uyên, Quỳnh Vi, Diễm Sương, Nguyệt Anh, Hương Giang	Paris By Night 101	2011	United States
7	"Người Tình Ơi! Mơ Gì"	Nguyễn Tường Văn	Mai Tiến Dũng	Paris By Night 101	2011	United States
8	"LK Mùa Thu Yêu Đương, Bé Yêu"	Lam Phương	Mai Tiến Dũng	Paris By Night 102	2011	United States
9	"Gục Ngã"	Phúc Trường	solo	Paris By Night 103	2011	United States
10	Không gian ba chiều	Nguyễn Hải Phong	solo	A Dancing Dream - Season 1	2011	United States
11	"Gọi Tên Ngày Mới"	Võ Hoài Phúc	Kỳ Phương Uyên, Minh Tuyết, Như Quỳnh	Paris By Night 104	2011	United States
12	"Angel"	Hoài An	Mai Tiến Dũng	Paris By Night 104	2011	United States
13	"Huyền Thoại Người Con Gái"	Lê Hựu Hà	solo	Paris By Night 104 VIP Party	2012	United States
14	"Người Tình Trăm Năm"	Đức Huy	Ngọc Anh, Lưu Bích, Như Quỳnh, Minh Tuyết, Kỳ Phương Uyên, Thanh Hà, Như Loan, Lam Anh, Diễm Sương, Quỳnh Vi, Hạ Vy	Paris By Night 105	2012	United States
15	"Cho Em Ngày Mới"	Lưu Thiên Hương	solo	Paris By Night 105	2012	United States
16	"Lời Nhạt Phai"	Lương Bằng Quang	solo	VSTAR 2012 - Đêm Trao Giải	2012	United States
17	"Xóa Hết"	Lương Bằng Quang	solo	Paris By Night 106	2012	United States
18	Medley: "Mùa Thu Trong Mưa", "Búp Bê Không Tình Yêu"	Trường Sa, Vũ Xuân Hùng	Như Quỳnh, Lam Anh, Diễm Sương, Quỳnh Vi, Thanh Hà, Mai Thiên Vân, Hạ Vy, Minh Tuyết, Hương Giang, Hương Thủy, Kỳ Phương Uyên, Ngọc Anh, Như Loan	Paris By Night 106	2012	United States
19	"Rồi Mai Ta Bên Nhau"	Nguyễn Đức Cường	Mai Tiến Dũng	Paris By Night 106 VIP Party	2013	United States
20	"Lột Xác"	Nguyễn Hải Phong	Mai Tiến Dũng	Paris By Night 107	2013	United States
21	LK "Mùa Hè Đẹp Nhất", "Chỉ Là Mùa Thu Rơi", "Góc Phố Rêu Xanh", "Khúc Giao Mùa"	Đức Huy, Quốc Dũng, Nguyễn Đức Cường, Nhật Trung, Huy Tuấn	Minh Tuyết, Ngọc Anh, Kỳ Phương Uyên	Paris By Night 108	2013	United States
22	"Em Đẹp Nhất Đêm Nay"	Phạm Duy	solo	Paris By Night 108	2013	United States
23	LK "Tung Bay", "Cò Lả"	Lương Bằng Quang	Ánh Minh, Mai Tiến Dũng, Như Loan, Quỳnh Vi	Paris By Night 109	2013	United States
24	LK "Xin Đừng Trách Đa Đa", "Mưa Trên Phố Huế", "Em Đi Chùa Hương"	Võ Đông Điền, Minh Kỳ, Tôn Nữ Thụy Khương, Trung Đức, Nguyễn Nhược Pháp	Kỳ Phương Uyên, Hạ Vy, Ánh Minh, Hương Giang, Minh Tuyết, Mai Thiên Vân, Diễm Sương, Hương Thủy, Lam Anh, Như Quỳnh, Bảo Hân, Hồ Lệ Thu, Châu Ngọc, Như Loan, Thu Phương	Paris By Night 109	2013	United States
25	"Tiễn Anh Về Nơi Xa"	Vĩnh Tâm	solo	Paris By Night 109	2013	United States
26	"Hát Mãi Bài Tình Ca"	Thái Thịnh	Minh Tuyết, Như Loan, Như Quỳnh, Don Hồ, Mai Thiên Vân, Hạ Vy, Mạnh Quỳnh, Hương Thủy, Quang Lê, Ngọc Hạ, Trần Thái Hòa, Thế Sơn, Châu Ngọc, Hồ Lệ Thu, Kỳ Phương Uyên, Mai Tiến Dũng, Quỳnh Vi, Trịnh Lam, Lương Tùng Quang, Diễm Sương, Duy Trường, Khánh Lâm, Tommy Ngô, Lynda Trang Đài, Đình Bảo, Ánh Minh, Hương Giang, Anh Tú, Thiên Tôn, Ý Lan, Ngọc Anh, Thu Phương, Giang Tử, Hương Lan, Thái Châu, Quang Dũng, Nguyễn Hưng, Thanh Hà, Lưu Bích, Tuấn Ngọc, Khánh Hà, Dương Triệu Vũ, Lam Anh, Bằng Kiều, Họa Mi, Elvis Phương	Paris By Night 109	2013	United States
27	"Mystical Night"	Hoài An	Mai Tiến Dũng	Paris By Night 109 VIP Party	2013	United States
28	LK Mary's Boy Child	Paris By Night Gloria	Mai Tiến Dũng		2013	United States
29	"Xuân Về Nhớ Tết Năm Nay"	Hoài Linh	Hương Thủy	Paris By Night 110	2014	United States
30	"Phút Giao Thừa Dịu Êm"	Nguyễn Kim Tuấn	Trần Thái Hòa, Trịnh Lam, Thiên Tôn, Đình Bảo, Quỳnh Vi, Thanh Hà, Ngọc Anh	Paris By Night 110	2014	United States
31	"Nhịp Bước Ngày Xuân"	Phúc Trường	Mai Tiến Dũng	Paris By Night 110	2014	United States
32	"I Gotta Go"	Kiên Trần	solo	VSTAR 2013 - Đêm Trao Giải	2014	United States
33	"Tình Hoài Hương"	Phạm Duy	Trần Thái Hòa, Thiên Tôn, Đình Bảo, Như Quỳnh, Hạ Vy, Quỳnh Vi, Ngọc Anh, Mai Thiên Vân	Paris By Night 111	2014	United States
34	"Sợi Nhớ"	Lương Bằng Quang	Mai Tiến Dũng	Paris By Night 111	2014	United States
35	"Sài Gòn, Sài Gòn"	Châu Đăng Khoa	Mai Tiến Dũng, Anh Tú, Justin Nguyễn, Kỳ Phương Uyên, Như Loan, Ánh Minh, Diễm Sương, Lam Anh	Paris By Night 111	2014	United States
36	"Let It Go"	Kristen Anderson-Lopez, Robert Lopez	solo	Paris By Night 112	2014	United States
37	"Tiếng Chuông Ngân"	Nguyễn Ngọc Thiện	solo	Paris By Night Gloria 2	2014	United States
38	"Đón Xuân"	Phạm Đình Chương	solo	Paris By Night 113	2015	United States
39	"Cảm Xúc"	Châu Đăng Khoa	solo	Paris By Night 113	2015	United States
40	"Dáng Tiên Xuân Ngời"	Lương Bằng Quang	Lam Anh, Ngọc Anh, Quỳnh Vi, Hoàng Nhung	Paris By Night 115	2015	United States
41	"Big Girls Don't Cry"	Châu Đăng Khoa	solo	Paris By Night 115	2015	United States
42	"Yêu Lần Đầu"	Đức Huy	solo	Paris By Night 118	2016	United States
43	"Em Kể Anh Nghe"	Nguyễn Hải Phong	solo	Paris By Night 120	2016	United States
44	"Chẳng Cần Ai, Chỉ Cần Anh"	Rhymastic	solo	Paris By Night 130	2019	Singapore
45	"Time to Move On"	Nguyễn Tùng	solo	Paris By Night 134	2022	Thailand
46	Medley: "Như Vẫn Còn Đây", "Gục Ngã", "Angel"	Phúc Trường, Hoài An	Mai Tiến Dũng	Paris By Night 136	2023	Thailand

=== Joint concerts and music festivals in Vietnam ===
List of performances that Tóc Tiên performs, showing dates, location, co-performers and relevant informations
Year	Date	Event	City/province	Co-performers	Ref(s)	Note(s)
2015	8 October	Monsoon Music Festival 2015	Hanoi	WhoMadeWho, Maius Philharmonic, Slim V & Crazy Monkey, Uyên Linh, Phạm Anh Khoa, Hoàng Thuỳ Linh, Trung Quân, Kimmese, Tiên Tiên, Đông Hùng, Tạ Quang Thắng, Thái Châu		
2016	31 December	Heineken Countdown 2016	Hanoi	Mỹ Tâm, Tuấn Hưng, Hương Tràm, Soobin Hoàng Sơn		
2017	26 August	Beach Festival - Twist all Summer	Da Nang	Bảo Thy, Ưng Hoàng Phúc, Issac, Soobin Hoàng Sơn, Only C, Lou Hoàng, Dương K, Trang Moon, Lê Thiện Hiếu, Fat B, Erik, Trúc Nhân, Bảo Anh, Suni Hạ Linh		
2017	2 September	Beach Festival - Twist all Summer	Bà Rịa-Vũng Tàu	Bảo Thy, Ưng Hoàng Phúc, Issac, Soobin Hoàng Sơn, Only C, Lou Hoàng, Dương K, Trang Moon, Lê Thiện Hiếu, Fat B, Erik, Trúc Nhân, Bảo Anh, Suni Hạ Linh		
2017	9 September	Beach Festival - Twist all Summer	Nha Trang	Bảo Thy, Ưng Hoàng Phúc, Issac, Soobin Hoàng Sơn, Only C, Lou Hoàng, Dương K, Trang Moon, Lê Thiện Hiếu, Fat B, Erik, Trúc Nhân, Bảo Anh, Suni Hạ Linh		
2017	31 December	Countdown 2018	Hanoi	Thu Minh, Tuấn Hưng, Miu Lê, Rhymastic, DJ Nimbia, DJ Get Looze, DJ Victor Bailey		
2018	1 January	Countdown 2018	Hanoi	Thu Minh, Tuấn Hưng, Miu Lê, Rhymastic, DJ Nimbia, DJ Get Looze, DJ Victor Bailey		
2018	6 January	Viettel Music Festival	Hanoi	Sơn Tùng M-TP, Noo Phước Thịnh, Vũ Cát Tường, Hoàng Touliver, DJ Trang Moon		
2018	8-9 June	Viettel Music Festival – Connecting millions of souls – Love for Football 2018	Ho Chi Minh City	Sơn Tùng M-TP, Đông Nhi, Soobin Hoàng Sơn, Min, Erik, JustaTee, Phương Ly		
2019	26 October	FWD Music Fest	Hanoi	Bằng Kiều, Đàm Vĩnh Hưng, Hồ Ngọc Hà, Sơn Tùng M-TP, Issac,...		
2019	31 December	Tiger Remix 2020	Hanoi	Tuấn Hưng, Hoàng Thùy Linh, Soobin Hoàng Sơn, Emily + BigDaddy, Min, DaLab, Ngũ Cung, DJ Slim V, Ali Hoàng Dương, Vũ., Orange, Cao Bá Hưng		
2020	1 January	Tiger Remix 2020	Hanoi	Tuấn Hưng, Hoàng Thùy Linh, Soobin Hoàng Sơn, Emily + BigDaddy, Min, DaLab, Ngũ Cung, DJ Slim V, Ali Hoàng Dương, Vũ., Orange, Cao Bá Hưng		
2020	11 January	2020 K-Pop Super Concert in Vietnam	Hanoi	Taemin (SHINee), EXO-SC, NCT 127, AlphaBAT, ELRIS, A.C.E		Opening act
2022	31 December	Tiger Remix 2023	Ho Chi Minh City	CL, Hà Anh Tuấn, Rhymastic, Only C, Erik		
2023	1 January	Tiger Remix 2023	Ho Chi Minh City	CL, Hà Anh Tuấn, Rhymastic, Only C, Erik		
2023	7-8 July	All Stars Festival	Hội An	Mono, Thanh Duy, Delilah, Issac, Sofia, Chillies		
2023	16 December	8Wonder Winter Festival	Phú Quốc	Maroon 5, JustaTee, Phương Ly, Double2T, Grey D, DJ 2Pillz		
2024	20 January	Concert Living a "profitable" life by VietinBank	Ho Chi Minh City	Đen Vâu, Hà Anh Tuấn, JustaTee, Phương Ly, Wren Evans, Minh, Phùng Khánh Linh, Wean Le, Pay, The Flob...		
2024	23 March	Pepsi – Thirsty for more	Ho Chi Minh City	Mỹ Tâm, Karik, Suboi, B Ray, Double2T, Yuno BigBoi, HurryKng, Captain Boy, Huỳnh Công Hiếu		
2025	12 April	Sisters Who Make Waves Concert: 30 has never been a limit	Ho Chi Minh City	Sisters Who Make Waves Vietnam artists (seasons 1 and 2)		
2025	9 August	V Concert - Radiant Vietnam	Hanoi	Hà Anh Tuấn, Hồ Ngọc Hà, Đen Vâu, Noo Phước Thịnh, Trúc Nhân, Hoàng Thùy Linh, Hòa Minzy, Phương Mỹ Chi, Quang Hùng MasterD, Rhyder		
2025	10 August	National Concert: The Homeland in Our Hearts	Hanoi	Thu Huyền, Tùng Dương, Noo Phước Thịnh, Võ Hạ Trâm, Thanh Duy, Hà Lê, Suboi,...		
2025	11 November	Quảng Ninh - The Land of Heroes	Quảng Ninh	Hồ Ngọc Hà, Hoàng Thùy Linh, Trúc Nhân, (S)Trong Trọng Hiếu, Quang Hùng MasterD		
2025	16 November	Waterbomb Ho Chi Minh 2025	Ho Chi Minh City	Team Blue: EXID, B.I, All(H)ours, Raiden, Glory, Sungyoo; Team Pink: Jay Park, Hwasa, Soobin Hoàng Sơn, Chi Pu, Quang Hùng MasterD, DCR Milda, ZB & Ation, VA & Henry		Team Blue
2025	12 December	TikTok Shop Fun Fest	Ho Chi Minh City	Erik, Hoàng Thùy Linh, Đen Vâu, Quang Hùng MasterD, Min, Hoàng Dũng, Low G, LyHan, Thế Thiên		
2025	20 December	Y Concert Festival	Hưng Yên	From the program Sisters Who Make Waves Vietnam: Minh Tuyết, Phạm Quỳnh Anh, Ngọc Thanh Tâm, Vũ Ngọc Anh, MisThy, Ninh Dương Lan Ngọc, Trang Pháp, Diệp Lâm Anh, Huyền Baby, Khổng Tú Quỳnh, Minh Hằng, Bùi Lan Hương, Dương Hoàng Yến, Ái Phương, Maitinhvi, Kiều Anh, Xuân Nghi, Tuimi, Mie, Hậu Hoàng, Đồng Ánh Quỳnh, Ngọc Phước. From the program Call Me by Fire Vietnam: Tự Long, Thanh Duy, Jun Phạm, Cường Seven, Thiên Minh, Rhymastic, SOOBIN, Tăng Phúc, Bùi Công Nam, Đỗ Hoàng Hiệp, S.T Sơn Thạch, Neko Lê, Kiên Ứng, HuyR, Duy Khánh, Đinh Tiến Đạt, Phan Đinh Tùng, Phạm Khánh Hưng, Binz, BB Trần, Quốc Thiên. From the program Show It All Vietnam: Hồ Đông Quan, Cường Bạch, Thái Lê Minh Hiếu, Wonbi, Swan Nguyễn, Duy Lân, Long Hoàng, minhtin, Đức Duy, Lâm Anh, Phúc Nguyên.		Team Sisters Who Make Waves Vietnam
2025	27 December	Tiger Remix 2026	Đồng Tháp	SOOBIN, NSND Hữu Quốc, Hoàng Thuỳ Linh, DJ Soda, (S)TRONG Trọng Hiếu, Quang Hùng MasterD, Anh Tú, Phương Mỹ Chi, Kay Trần, Phạm Anh Khoa, Muộii, Hoàng Rapper, DJ Hoaprox, DJ KS, DJ Hino, MC Hype MastaB		
2025	31 December	Tiger Remix 2026	Ho Chi Minh City	SOOBIN, NSND Hữu Quốc, Hoàng Thuỳ Linh, DJ Soda, (S)TRONG Trọng Hiếu, Quang Hùng MasterD, Anh Tú, Phương Mỹ Chi, Kay Trần, Phạm Anh Khoa, Muộii, Hoàng Rapper, DJ Hoaprox, DJ KS, DJ Hino, MC Hype MastaB		

== Awards and nominations ==
Year (Note: The years in the table indicate the year in which the awards show took place. If the 2015 edition of an awards show takes place in 2016, the table will indicate the latter year.)	Award	Category	Nominee/work	Result	Ref.
2014	Star of the Year (Vietnam)	Beautiful Woman of the Year	Herself	Nominated	
2015	Men of the Year	Pretty Woman of the Year	Herself	Won	
2015	Yan Online Awards	Breakout Artist	Herself	Nominated	
2015	We Choice Awards (Note: Before 2016, the WeChoice Awards were stylized as "We Choice" for their first edition.)	Collaboration of the Year	Herself (with Touliver)	Nominated	
2015	Elle Style Awards (Vietnam)	Upcoming Female Singer of the Year	Herself	Won	
2015	VTV Awards	Most Notable Singer	Herself	Nominated	
2015	Green Wave Awards	Top 5 Most Favorite Singers – Top Hit (Note: No specific ranking is ever mentioned for this category.)	Herself	Won	
2015	Green Wave Awards	Single of the Year	"Ngày mai (Vũ điệu cồng chiêng)" (with TeamV)	Nominated	
2015	Pops Awards	Most Covered Music Video	"Ngày mai (Vũ điệu cồng chiêng)" (with TeamV)	Won	
2015	Vietnam Top Hits	Top 5 Hits of the Year	"Ngày mai (Vũ điệu cồng chiêng)" (with TeamV)	Won	
2016	Yan Vpop 20 Awards	Top 20 Outstanding Singers	Herself	Won	
2016	Yan Vpop 20 Awards	Best Female Artist	Herself	Won	
2016	Zing Music Awards	Favourite Dance/Electronic Song	"Ngày mai (Vũ điệu cồng chiêng)" (with TeamV)	Won	
2016	LGBT Appreciation Awards	Most Influential Person Voted by the Public	Herself	Won	
2016	WeChoice Awards	Inspirational Playlist	"Ngày mai (Vũ điệu cồng chiêng)" (with TeamV)	Included	
2016	WeChoice Awards	Inspirational Person of 2015	Herself	Nominated	
2016	WeChoice Awards	Top Youth Trend of the Year	"Vũ điệu cồng chiêng"	Nominated	
2016	Bài hát tôi yêu	Best Music Video Voted by the Judges	"The Beat of Celebration" (featuring JustaTee, Big Daddy and Touliver)	Silver	
2016	Bài hát tôi yêu	Most Effective Performer	Herself	Won	
2016	Dedication Music Awards	Music Video of the Year	"Ngày mai (Vũ điệu cồng chiêng)" (with TeamV)	Nominated	
2016	HTV Awards	Most Favorite Female Singer	Herself	Nominated	
2016	Her World Young Woman Achiever	Music	Herself	Nominated	
2017	Green Wave Awards (Note: The 18th Làn Sóng Xanh Awards ceremony was held on 18 December 2015, but the 19th edition was held on 4 January 2017.)	Top 5 Most Favorite Singers – Top Hit	Herself	Won	
2017	Yan Vpop 20 Awards	Top 20 Outstanding Singers	Herself	Nominated	
2017	Elle Style Awards Vietnam	Most Stylish Female Singer	Herself	Nominated	
2017	Mnet Asian Music Awards	Best Asian Artist in Vietnam	Herself	Won	
2017	Mnet Asian Music Awards	Vietnamese Breakout Artist with Close-Up	Herself	Nominated	
2018	Green Wave Awards	Top 5 Most Favorite Singers – Top Hit	Herself	Won	
2018	Green Wave Awards	Single of the Year	"Hôm nay tôi cô đơn quá" (featuring Rhymastic)	Nominated	
2018	Keeng Young Awards	Music Video of the Year	"Em không là duy nhất"	Nominated	
2018	V Live Awards	Best Iconic Star	Herself	Won	
2018	Dedication Music Award	Song of the Year	"Hôm nay tôi cô đơn quá" (featuring Rhymastic)	Nominated	
2019	Dedication Music Awards	Song of the Year	"Có ai thương em như anh"	Won	
2019	Dedication Music Awards	Music Video of the Year	"Có ai thương em như anh"	Nominated	
2019	Zing Music Awards	Rap/Hip-hop Song of the Year	"Nước mắt em lau bằng tình yêu mới"	Won	
2019	Zing Music Awards	Most Favourite OST	"Ước mơ mùa thu"	Nominated	
2019	Zing Music Awards	Most Favourite Female Artist	Bản thân	Nominated	
2022	TikTok Awards Vietnam	Content Creator of the Year	Bản thân	Nominated	
2025	Luxuo Asia Awards	Most Influential Person of the Year	Bản thân	Won	
2025	Giải Mai Vàng	Most Favourite Female Artist	Bản thân	Pending	

== Notes ==
Awards and achievements
Preceded by None	Vietnam in the Eurovision Song Contest Asia; 2026	Succeeded by TBD
