= Những Thành Phố Mơ Màng =

- Genre: Indie, rock, hip-hop, pop
- Locations: Hanoi; Da Nang; Ho Chi Minh City
- Years active: 2022–present
- Website: ntpmm.com

Những Thành Phố Mơ Màng is a series of annual music festivals held in major cities across Vietnam, including Hanoi, Da Nang, and Ho Chi Minh City. The events feature a diverse lineup of Vietnamese artists spanning genres such as indie, rock, hip-hop, and pop, attracting over 20,000 attendees per event.

== History ==
The festival series began in 2022 with its inaugural event in Ho Chi Minh City at the Saigon Exhibition and Convention Center (SECC), lasting seven hours and focusing on rock music for Gen Z audiences. In 2023, an edition in Hanoi drew 7,000 attendees, featuring indie artists like The Flob, Doãn Hoài Nam & Mạc Mai Sương, and Band Anh Quang.

In 2024, the summer tour edition in Hanoi was interrupted by heavy rain and thunderstorms, leading to its postponement. The event was rescheduled for July, but faced controversy when artist Thắng (formerly of Ngọt) was removed from the lineup amid backlash. The year-end 2024 editions were held in Da Nang and Ho Chi Minh City, promising a mix of R&B, hip-hop, indie, pop, and rock. Another Hanoi event in December 2024 attracted over 10,000 fans, with performers including HIEUTHUHAI and Đen Vâu.

The 2025 summer edition continued the tradition, with events in Hanoi and Ho Chi Minh City at Phu Tho Stadium, featuring explosive sets from various artists.

== See also ==
- 8Wonder
