= The Winner Is Vietnam =

Vietnamese vocal game show

- Also known as: The Winner is...
- Created by: John de Mol
- Presented by: Bình Minh (season 1); Hoài Linh (season 2); Đại Nghĩa (season 3, ep 2); Ngô Kiến Huy, Á hậu Hoàng Oanh (season 3, ep 1)
- Starring: Siu Black (season 1); Hoài Linh (season 1) various in season 2 and 3
- Country of origin: Vietnam
- Original language: Vietnamese
- No. of seasons: 3
- No. of episodes: 36

Production
- Running time: ~ 90 minutes, non-commercial
- Production companies: Talpa Media International; Đông Tây Promotion

Original release
- Network: HTV
- Release: May 25, 2013 – October 4, 2015

Related
- The Winner Is

Tôi là... người chiến thắng is a Vietnamese vocal game show, airing on HTV7 at 9:00 pm (UTC+7) prime time slot every Saturdays. The show premiered on May 25, 2013 with Bình Minh as the host and Siu Black/Hoài Linh as a special 101st judge. The winner of the show might take home 300,000,000 VND in cash (roughly $14,000). The first season includes 12 episodes, featuring contestants in eight categories namely Boys, Girls, Male Singers, Female Singers, Students, Middle Ages, Celebrities and Groups.

The show builds its format differently from the original and the U.S. adaptation that in the first rounds there are no battles. In fact, all the candidates are singing for the public vote. The four candidates with highest scores of a category are then advanced to second round, singing duet for survival.

Trần Hải Châu, a 21-year-old student, won the first season and obtained the final grand prizes, including a studio single with Universal Music, and 630,000,000 ₫ in cash (almost $30,000).

The show will return in 2014 with 12 episodes. Eight categories are introduced, including two Celebrity categories, two Singer categories, Students, Middle Ages, together with newly two Underground Singer categories. Comedians and Bands/Groups are originally official categories of the 2014 season; they, however, were dropped out due to lack of qualified candidates.

== Synopsis ==
Đông Tây Promotion and Ho Chi Minh City Television won the right to produce the Vietnamese adaptation. It might be the first Asian adaptation of the franchise and it was launched before the U.S. adaptation. The first season was hosted by Bình Mình and starred Siu Black or Hoài Linh, who can affect the result of a duet. Each episode is about a category, a quarter final round, a semifinal round and a finale while the original focuses on the first phase (first-rounded battles in many categories), the second phase (second and third-rounded battles in many categories), the quarter-final/semifinal/season finale.

The Vietnamese adaptation marks its uniqueness as a mix of two hot shows Deal or No Deal and The Voice.

=== Format ===
The program consists of several phases. In the first phase, the pre-selection, all entries are reviewed by the production jury. All candidates are invited to audition and based on that audition is decided whether the candidate is good enough to be allowed for television recordings. After short-listing the candidates are divided into eight categories of eight candidates. In all these first rounds eight candidates sing solo and the panel of 101 judges, including Siu Black (later replaced by Hoài Linh from the live show,) thus score them. The four highest scores are moved to the second rounds in two battles. In the case that the highest four cannot be determined, if two candidates have the same score (making the highest five) then Siu Black has the ultimate power to decide who had better leave the competition for good; if three or more candidates have the same score (making the highest six or more) the ultimate power is shifted to the audience to vote off some. And the highest score of them all has the right to pick the opponent for a battle. Thereafter the second rounds happen and "deal" element is introduced. Accepted the deal and earned the money of 10,000,000 VND, the candidate is automatically evicted from the competition no matter how many score he gains in the battle and the opponent is immediately declared winning. Otherwise no deal occurs, the candidate with higher score wins and the money is added up to the final grand prize. The eight categories are covered in first eight episodes.

The two winners of a category advance to the quarter-final round, where it can be. Again earned money of 20,000,000 VND the loser is right out of the league. Otherwise no deal occurs, the candidate with higher score wins and the money is added up to the final grand prize. The quarter final rounds are covered in two episodes.

In the very last battle to decide who the winner is, the audience voting is used as a determining factor. Audience can score from home in the last 15 minutes, which gives 100 to the battle, adding with score from 101 judges to make a possible 201 score.

Step by step the candidate is out until there is only one remain, taking the final grand prize home. The final grand prize includes the basic prize announced of 300,000,000 ₫ in cash, and the negotiation prizes during battles if no deal occurred.

== Season 1 ==
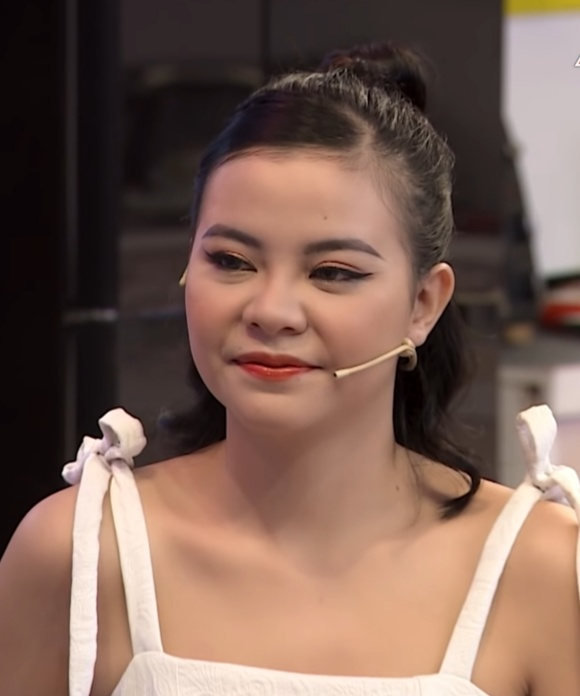
TIA (Trần Hải Châu), season one winner

Legend
– Contestant wins and/or advances
- Contestant wins the grand prize
– Contestant loses and/or is eliminated
– Contestant takes the money offer and is eliminated
GUY - Candidate from Guy Category
GRL - Candidate from Girl Category
STU - Candidate from Student Category
MA - Candidate from Middle Age Category
CEL - Candidate from Celebrity Category
GRP - Candidate from Band/Group Category
MSG - Candidate from Male Singer Category
FSG - Candidate from Female Singer Category

=== Results ===
Round of 16
GUY	Nguyễn Tuấn Nghĩa	46
GRL	Nguyễn Thị Lệ Ngọc	55
STU	Võ Xuân Hiển	67
MA	Kỳ Phương	34
CEL	Đặng Thị Hoài Trinh	40
GRP	It's Time	61
MSG	Trần Quốc Thiên	64
FSG	Anh Thúy	37
Note: Pairings are re-seeded after the first round.
CEL	Lê Thị Tú Vi	27
GRP	Dòng Thời Gian	74
GUY	Nguyễn Quốc Huy Luân	60
GRL	Nguyễn Thị Thùy Linh	41
MA	Đặng Thị Lệ Hoa	10
STU	Trần Hải Châu	91
MSG	Nguyễn Ngọc Minh	58
FSG	H'Zina Bya	43

Round of 8
GRL	Nguyễn Thị Lệ Ngọc	40
GUY	Nguyễn Quốc Huy Luân	61
MSG	Trần Quốc Thiên	53
MSG	Nguyễn Ngọc Minh	48
STU	Võ Xuân Hiển	16
STU	Trần Hải Châu	85
GRP	It's Time	41
GRP	Dòng Thời Gian	60

Round of 4
MSG	Trần Quốc Thiên	44
GUY	Nguyễn Quốc Huy Luân	57
GRP	Dòng Thời Gian	11
STU	Trần Hải Châu	90

Finale
GUY	Nguyễn Quốc Huy Luân	42
STU	Trần Hải Châu	159

=== Episodes ===
==== Episode 1: Girls ====
Aired: May 25, 2013

Round 1
Money Offer	Song	Competitor (Votes)	Results
N/A	"Sao ta lặng im" (Nguyễn Hồng Thuận)	Nguyễn Thị Lệ Ngọc (78)	Fast Track
N/A	"Như vẫn còn đây" (Phúc Trường)	Trần Dương Uyên Thy (35)	Eliminated
N/A	"Người em yêu mãi" (Hải Âu)	Nguyễn Thu Hiền (58)	Eliminated
N/A	"Son" (Đức Nghĩa)	Nguyễn Thị Thùy Linh (78)	Advance
N/A	"Cảm ơn tình yêu" (Huy Tuấn)	Vũ Minh Trang (31)	Eliminated
N/A	"Đâu phải bởi mùa thu" (Phú Quang; Giáng Vân)	Võ Vũ Thùy Dung (39)	Eliminated
N/A	"Đời bỗng vui" (Đức Trí)	Lê Thị Bích Ngọc (70)	Advance
N/A	"Yêu mình anh" (Dada)	Nguyễn Phương Thùy (75)	Advance
Round 2
Money Offer	Song	Competitor (Votes)	Results
10,000,000 ₫	"Anh mãi là" (Hồ Hoài Anh)	Lê Thị Bích Ngọc (29)	Lose
10,000,000 ₫	"Mong anh về" (Dương Cầm)	Nguyễn Thị Thùy Linh (72)	Win
10,000,000 ₫	"Cám ơn anh" (Minh Thụy)	Nguyễn Phương Thùy (39)	Lose
10,000,000 ₫	"Mãi mãi về sau" (Dương Khắc Linh, Thanh Bui, Hoàng Huy Long)	Nguyễn Thị Lệ Ngọc (62)	Win

==== Episode 2: Male Singers ====
Aired: June 01, 2013

Round 1
Money Offer	Song	Competitor (Votes)	Results
N/A	"Trái tim bên lề" (Khải Tuấn)	Trần Lân Nhã (70)	Advance
N/A	"Say You'll Be There" by Spice Girls	Phạm Dũng Hà (52)	Eliminated
N/A	"Lại gần hôn anh" (Phạm Duy)	Nguyễn Hoài Nam (41)	Eliminated
N/A	"Góc tối" (Nguyễn Hải Phong)	Nguyễn Ngọc Minh (74)	Advance
N/A	"Dấu yêu một thời" (himself)	Nguyễn Mạnh Quân (68)	Eliminated
N/A	"Xin chào! Xin chào!" (Đức Trí)	Trần Quốc Thiên (92)	Fast Track
N/A	"You Raise Me Up" by Secret Garden	Nguyễn Đức Quang (87)	Advance
N/A	"Tình nhân" (Tăng Nhật Tuệ)	Lê Việt Anh (47)	Eliminated
Round 2
Money Offer	Song	Competitor (Votes)	Results
10,000,000 ₫	"Quỳnh" (Quốc Bảo)	Trần Lân Nhã (21)	Lose
10,000,000 ₫	"Yêu thương mong manh" (Đức Trí, Hà Quang Minh)	Nguyễn Ngọc Minh (80)	Win
10,000,000 ₫	"Brave" by Josh Groban	Nguyễn Đức Quang (18)	Lose
10,000,000 ₫	"Lạc" (Toàn Thắng)	Trần Quốc Thiên (83)	Win

==== Episode 3: Groups ====
Aired: June 08, 2013

Round 1
Money Offer	Song	Competitor (Votes)	Results
N/A	"Yêu dấu theo gió bay" (Nguyễn Hoàng Duy)	TVM (32)	Eliminated
N/A	"Vive la Vida"	Coco Band (44)	Eliminated
N/A	"Love Me Tender" by Elvis Presley	Tóc Ngắn (73)	Eliminated
N/A	"Ngôi sao ước mơ" (Nguyễn Hoàng Anh Minh)	VMen (85)	Advance
N/A	"Nơi ấy" (Dương Khắc Linh, Hà Okio)	It's Time (85)	Advance
N/A	"Hương ngọc lan" (Anh Quân)	Dòng Thời Gian (95)	Fast Track
N/A	"Im lặng" (Trương Thanh Hiếu)	Nhật Nguyệt (51)	Eliminated
N/A	"Larger than Life" by the Backstreet Boys	The Leaders (80)	Advance
Round 2
Money Offer	Song	Competitor (Votes)	Results
10,000,000 ₫	"One More Night" by the Maroon 5	The Leader (47)	Lose
10,000,000 ₫	"Lạc lối" (Hồ Hoài Anh)	It's Time (54)	Win
10,000,000 ₫	"Love to Be Loved by You" by Marc Terenzi	VMen (24)	Lose
10,000,000 ₫	"Time to Say Goodbye"	Dòng Thời Gian (77)	Win

==== Episode 4: Middle Ages ====
Aired: June 15, 2013

Round 1
Money Offer	Song	Competitor (Votes)	Results
N/A	"Bánh xe lãng tử" (Trọng Khương)	Phạm Hoàng Nga (76)	Advance
N/A	"Nỗi lòng người đi" (Anh Bằng)	Đặng Phi Sơn (44)	Eliminated
N/A	"Nhớ em" (himself)	Kỳ Phương (75)	Advance
N/A	"Tình 2000" (Võ Thiện Thanh)	Đặng Thị Lệ Hoa (76)	Advance
N/A	"Imagine" by John Lennon	Y Thanh (70)	Eliminated
N/A	"Xin còn gọi tên nhau" (Trường Sa)	Lê Thị Duy Thủy (45)	Eliminated
N/A	"Bản tình cuối" (Ngô Thụy Miên)	Thái Sơn	Eliminated
N/A	"I Hate Myself for Loving You" by Joan Jett and the Blackhearts	Phạm Thị Bạch Lan (82)	Fast Track
Round 2
Money Offer	Song	Competitor (Votes)	Results
10,000,000 ₫	"Vết lăn trầm" (Trịnh Công Sơn)	Phạm Hoàng Nga (37)	Lose
10,000,000 ₫	"Cho người tình xa" (himself)	Kỳ Phương (64)	Win
10,000,000 ₫	"Hurt" by Christina Aguilera	Đặng Thị Lệ Hoa (59)	Win
10,000,000 ₫	"Trả hết cho người" (Lê Hựu Hà)	Phạm Thị Bạch Lan (42)	Lose

==== Episode 5: Students ====
Aired: June 22, 2013

Round 1
Money Offer	Song	Competitor (Votes)	Results
N/A	"Sẽ mãi bên nhau" by Hồ Ngọc Hà	Ngô Thủy Tiên (14)	Eliminated
N/A	"Torna a Surriento"	Nguyễn Thành Trung (77)	Advance
N/A	"Nếu như anh đến" by Văn Mai Hương	Nguyễn Thị Mai Phương (16)	Eliminated
N/A	"Khoảng trời của bé" (Nguyễn Duy Hùng)	Võ Xuân Hiển (91)	Fast Track
N/A	"Set Fire to the Rain" by Adele	Trần Hải Châu (73)	Advance
N/A	"Thu cuối" by Mr.T feat. Yanbi	Võ Đình Hiếu (39)	Eliminated
N/A	"Dù có cách xa" (Đinh Mạnh Ninh)	Trần Giang Đại Hoàng (48)	Eliminated
N/A	"Taxi" by Thu Minh	Phan Thị Thanh Nga (66)	Advance
Round 2
Money Offer	Song	Competitor (Votes)	Results
10,000,000 ₫	"Anh" (Xuân Phương)	Phan Thị Thanh Nga (7)	Lose
10,000,000 ₫	"Rolling in the Deep" by Adele	Trần Hải Châu (94)	Win
10,000,000 ₫	"Lá đỏ" (Hoàng Hiệp, Nguyễn Đình Thi)	Nguyễn Thành Trung (13)	Lose
10,000,000 ₫	"Radio" by Hà Anh Tuấn	Võ Xuân Hiển (88)	Win

==== Episode 6: Boys ====
Aired: June 29, 2013

Round 1
Money Offer	Song	Competitor (Votes)	Results
N/A	"Tâm hồn của đá" by Bức Tường	Hồ Minh Ngọc (35)	Eliminated
N/A	"Vệt nắng cuối trời" (Tiến Minh)	Nguyễn Công Hiếu (34)	Eliminated
N/A	"Phôi pha" (Trịnh Công Sơn)	Nguyễn Quốc Huy Luân (83)	Advance
N/A	"Đổi thay" (Kim Tuấn)	Nguyễn Văn Đức (24)	Eliminated
N/A	"Ain't No Sunshine" by Bill Withers	Thái Huy Sắc (90)	Advance
N/A	"Gửi ngàn lời yêu" (Minh Vương, Lê Việt Khanh)	Nguyễn Tuấn Nghĩa (57)	Advance
N/A	"Đến với nhau" (Dương Trường Giang)	Phan Quang Hùng (35)	Eliminated
N/A	"'O sole mio"	Nguyễn Tiến Hưng (90)	Fast Track
Round 2
Money Offer	Song	Competitor (Votes)	Results
10,000,000 ₫	"Unchained Melody" by The Righteous Brothers	Nguyễn Tuấn Nghĩa (68)	Win
10,000,000 ₫	"Độc bước" (Trần Trung Đức)	Thái Huy Sắc (33)	Lose
10,000,000 ₫	"Lạc mất mùa xuân"/"Le Géant de papier"	Nguyễn Quốc Huy Luân (52)	Win
10,000,000 ₫	"Nơi đảo xa" (Thế Song)	Nguyễn Tiến Hưng (49)	Lose

==== Episode 7: Female Singers ====
Aired: July 06, 2013

Round 1
Money Offer	Song	Competitor (Votes)	Results
N/A	"Ngôi sao cô đơn" (Thanh Tùng)	Anh Thúy (76)	Advance
N/A	"Sa mạc tình yêu"/"Ai no shinkirou"	Hà Thúy Anh (36)	Eliminated
N/A	"Oops!... I Did It Again" by Britney Spears	Nguyễn Võ Lan Trinh (74)	Advance
N/A	"Biết đâu" by herself	Thùy Hoàng Diễm (40)	Eliminated
N/A	"Hush Hush; Hush Hush" by The Pussycat Dolls	Lưu Hiền Trinh (82)	Advance
N/A	"Trắng và đen" (Minh Thụy)	H'Zina Bya (90)	Fast Track
N/A	"Giấc mơ chỉ là giấc mơ" (Đức Trí)	Nguyễn Thị Bảo Trâm (52)	Eliminated
N/A	"I Will Always Love You" by Whitney Houston	Lê Thị Hương Trà (57)	Eliminated
Round 2
Money Offer	Song	Competitor (Votes)	Results
10,000,000 ₫	"Họa mi hót trong mưa" (Thanh Tùng)	Lưu Hiền Trinh (44)	Lose
10,000,000 ₫	"To Love You More" by Céline Dion	Anh Thúy (57)	Win
10,000,000 ₫	"Ngày xưa Hoàng Thị" (Phạm Duy)	Nguyễn Võ Lan Trinh (32)	Lose
10,000,000 ₫	"Chuyện tình" (Anh Quân)	H'Zina Bya (69)	Win

==== Episode 8: Celebrities ====
Aired: July 13, 2013

Round 1
Money Offer	Song	Competitor (Votes)	Results
N/A	"Còn ta với nồng nàn" (Quốc Bảo)	Nguyễn Tuấn Nam (46)	Eliminated
N/A	"Những ngày đẹp trời"/"Your Back Towards Me"	Lê Thị Tú Vi (53, 81)	High/Advance^{1}
N/A	"Thương thầm" (Vũ Quốc Việt)	Phạm Minh Luân (53, 47)	High/Eliminated^{1}
N/A	"Lạnh lùng" (Nguyễn Hoàng Duy)	Đàm Thu Trang (36)	Eliminated
N/A	"Còn đó chút hồng phai (Vũ Quốc Việt)	Quách Ngọc Ngoan (48)	Eliminated
N/A	"Feeling Good"	Đặng Thị Hoài Trinh (95)	Fast Track
N/A	"Ngựa ô thương nhớ" (Trần Tiến)	Nguyễn Hùng Thuận (53, 70)	High/Advance^{1}
N/A	"Halo" by Beyoncé	Vũ Nguyễn Hà Anh (65)	Advance
Round 2
Money Offer	Song	Competitor (Votes)	Results
10,000,000 ₫	"All That Jazz"	Vũ Nguyễn Hà Anh (33)	Lose
10,000,000 ₫	"Bleeding Love" by Leona Lewis	Lê Thị Tú Vi (68)	Win
10,000,000 ₫	"Nếu điều đó xảy ra" (Ngọc Châu)	Nguyễn Hùng Thuận (29)	Lose
10,000,000 ₫	"Trở lại tuổi thơ" (Anh Quân)	Đặng Thị Hoài Trinh (72)	Win

^1 After the first round, Tú Vi, Minh Luân and Hùng Thuận have the same score. Audience are asked to vote for each the second time. As a result, Minh Luân leaves the competition with 47.

==== Episode 9: The Quarter-final, Part 1 ====
Live: July 20, 2013

Quarter-final, Round 1
Money Offer	Song	Competitor (Votes)	Results
20,000,000 ₫	"Chiếc lá cuối cùng" (Tuấn Khanh)	Nguyễn Tuấn Nghĩa (46)	Lose
20,000,000 ₫	"Em nhớ anh vô cùng" (Duy Mạnh)	Nguyễn Thị Lệ Ngọc (55)	Win
20,000,000 ₫	"Xin lỗi, anh yêu em" (Minh Vương)	Võ Xuân Hiển (67)	Win
20,000,000 ₫	"Hãy hát lên" (Vũ Quốc Việt)	Kỳ Phương (34)	Lose
20,000,000 ₫	"The Silence" by Alexandra Burke	Đặng Thị Hoài Trinh (40)	Lose
20,000,000 ₫	"Tìm về nơi đâu?" by Thanh Bui and Tata Young	It's Time (61)	Win
20,000,000 ₫	"Bay" (Nguyễn Hải Phong)	Trần Quốc Thiên (64)	Win
20,000,000 ₫	"It's All Coming Back to Me Now" by Céline Dion	Anh Thúy (37)	Lose

==== Episode 10: The Quarter-final, Part 2 ====
Live: July 27, 2013

Quarter-final, Round 2
Money Offer	Song	Competitor (Votes)	Results
20,000,000 ₫	"Chỉ là giấc mơ" (Kim Ngọc) by Thanh Lam	Lê Thị Tú Vi (27)	Lose
20,000,000 ₫	"Người hát tình ca" by Uyên Linh	Dòng Thời Gian (74)	Win
20,000,000 ₫	"Anh sẽ nhớ mãi" by Bằng Kiều	Nguyễn Quốc Huy Luân (60)	Win
20,000,000 ₫	"Listen" by Beyoncé	Nguyễn Thị Thùy Linh (41)	Lose
20,000,000 ₫	"Ly cà phê Ban Mê" by Siu Black	Đặng Thị Lệ Hoa (10)	Lose
20,000,000 ₫	"Titanium" by David Guetta feat. Sia	Trần Hải Châu (91)	Win
20,000,000 ₫	"Chỉ còn lại tình yêu" by Bằng Kiều	Nguyễn Ngọc Minh (58)	Win
20,000,000 ₫	"Đừng nhìn lại" (Lương Bằng Quang)	H'Zina Bya (43)	Lose

==== Episode 11: The Semi-final ====
Live: August 03, 2013

Semi-final Round
Money Offer	Song	Competitor (Votes)	Results
30,000,000 ₫ bonus 10,000,000 ₫	"Lặng thầm một tình yêu" by Hồ Ngọc Hà and Thanh Bui	Nguyễn Thị Lệ Ngọc (40)	Lose
30,000,000 ₫ bonus 10,000,000 ₫	"Hẹn hò" (Phạm Duy)	Nguyễn Quốc Huy Luân (61)	Win
30,000,000 ₫	"Trở về" (Nguyễn Dân)	Võ Xuân Hiển (16)	Lose
30,000,000 ₫	"Mượn" (Lưu Thiên Hương)	Trần Hải Châu (85)	Win
30,000,000 ₫	"Cỏ và mưa" (Giáng Son)	Trần Quốc Thiên (53)	Win
30,000,000 ₫	"Dòng thời gian" (Nguyễn Hải Phong)	Nguyễn Ngọc Minh (48)	Lose
30,000,000 ₫ bonus 10,000,000 ₫	"Nếu chỉ sống một ngày"	It's Time (41)	Lose
30,000,000 ₫ bonus 10,000,000 ₫	"Il Mio Cuore Va" by Sarah Brightman	Dòng Thời Gian (60)	Win

==== Episode 12: Season Finale ====
Live: August 10, 2013

Final Round 1
Money Offer	Song	Competitor (Votes)	Results
40,000,000 ₫	"Dấu tình sầu"	Trần Quốc Thiên (44)	Lose
40,000,000 ₫	"Chiều một mình qua phố"	Nguyễn Quốc Huy Luân (57)	Win
40,000,000 ₫	"Dẫu có lỗi lầm"	Dòng Thời Gian (11)	Lose
40,000,000 ₫	"Unfaithful" by Rihanna	Trần Hải Châu (90)	Win
Final Round 2
Money Offer	Song	Competitor (Votes)	Results
60,000,000 ₫	"Đồng xanh"/"Green Fields" by The Brothers Four "Bức họa đồng quê" (Văn Phụng)	Nguyễn Quốc Huy Luân (42^{2})	Lose
60,000,000 ₫	"Bust Your Windows" by Jazmine Sullivan "Giận anh" (Đức Trí)	Trần Hải Châu (159^{2})	The Winner

^2 The final scores are added up by score from 101 judges with score from fan vote. Huy Luân gets 27 out of possible 100 by audience voting, the rest belongs to Hải Châu.

- Guest appearance:
  - Hồ Ngọc Hà ("Hãy thứ tha cho em")
  - Văn Mai Hương ("Là em đó")

== Season 2 ==
By the high-rated demography, the TV series was renewed for another season during the grand finale of the first season. It is set to return on July 12, 2014. Application for season two began on November 14 and ends on April 30. 12 episodes are ordered to air, with differences from season 1. Contestants after being selected will be divided into eight categories, namely: Celebrity #1, Celebrity #2, Singer #1, Singer #2, Underground Singer #1, Underground Singer #2, Student, and Middle Age. Band/Group was originally an official category of this season; it, however, has been dropped out due to lack of qualified candidates.

Legend
– Contestant wins and/or advances
- Contestant wins the grand prize
– Contestant loses and/or is eliminated
– Contestant takes the money offer and is eliminated
CE1 - Candidate from first CEebrity Category
CE2 - Candidate from second CEebrity Category
SG1 - Candidate from first Singer Category
SG2 - Candidate from second Singer Category
US1 - Candidate from first Underground Singer Category
US2 - Candidate from second Underground Singer Category
MA - Candidate from Middle Age Category
STU - Candidate from Student Category

=== Results ===
Round of 16
US2	Phạm Huỳnh Hoàng Tuấn	35
US1	Phù Vạn Nam Hương	66
SG2	Trần Thị Diễm Hương	20
SG1	Hoàng Nhật Minh	80
STU	Lê Thái Sơn	N/A
MA	Nguyễn Thái Trân	N/A
CE2	Nguyễn Minh Anh	39
CE1	Trương Thế Vinh	62
Note: Pairings are re-seeded after the first round.
US1	Jean Paul Blada	42
US2	Nay Danh	59
MA	Nguyễn Thị Bích Lệ	34
STU	Hồ Ngọc Lan Anh	67
CE1	Kyo York	40
CE2	Hà Lê	61
SG1	Nguyễn Ngọc Phương Trinh	62
SG2	Đỗ Tùng Lâm	39

Round of 8
US2	Nay Danh	11
US1	Phù Vạn Nam Hương	90
STU	Lê Thái Sơn	43
STU	Hồ Ngọc Lan Anh	58
SG1	Nguyễn Ngọc Phương Trinh	39
SG1	Hoàng Nhật Minh	62
CE2	Hà Lê	42
CE1	Trương Thế Vinh	59

Round of 4
SG1	Nguyễn Ngọc Phương Trinh	48
US1	Phù Vạn Nam Hương	53
STU	Hồ Ngọc Lan Anh	77
CE1	Trương Thế Vinh	24

Finale
US1	Phù Vạn Nam Hương	64
STU	Hồ Ngọc Lan Anh	137

== Syndication ==
Season 1

No.	Air Date	Title	Notes
01	May 25, 2013	Girl Category	2 Candidates advanced
02	June 1, 2013	Male Singer Category	2 Candidates advanced
03	June 8, 2013	Band/Group Category	2 Candidates advanced
04	June 15, 2013	Middle-Age Category	2 Candidates advanced
05	June 22, 2013	Student Category	2 Candidates advanced
06	June 29, 2013	Boy Category	2 Candidates advanced
07	July 6, 2013	Female Singer Category	2 Candidates advanced
08	July 13, 2013	Celebrity Category	2 Candidates advanced
09	July 20, 2013	The Quarter-final 1, Live	Round of 16
10	July 27, 2013	The Quarter-final 2, Live	Round of 16
11	August 3, 2013	The Semi-Final, Live	Round of 8
12	August 10, 2013	Live Season Finale	Round of 4/Winner Crowned

Season 2

No.	Air Date	Title	Notes
01	July 12, 2014	Celebrity Category #1	2 Candidates advanced
02	July 19, 2014	Singer Category #1	2 Candidates advanced
03	July 26, 2014	Underground Singer Category #1	2 Candidates advanced
04	August 2, 2014	Middle Age Category	2 Candidates advanced
05	August 9, 2014	Celebrity Category #2	2 Candidates advanced
06	August 16, 2014	Student Category	2 Candidates advanced
07	August 23, 2014	Underground Singer Category #2	2 Candidates advanced
08	August 30, 2014	Singer Category #2	2 Candidates advanced
09	September 7, 2014	The Quarter-final 1, Live	Round of 16
10	September 14, 2014	The Quarter-final 2, Live	Round of 16
11	September 21, 2014	The Semi-Final, Live	Round of 8
12	September 28, 2014	Live Season Finale	Round of 4/Winner Crowned

== Cancellation ==
On September 29, 2015, HTV and Đông Tây Promotion announced that they did not renew the 4th season due to expenses. In the next year, Biến hóa hoàn hảo - My name is filled the show's 9 p.m. time slot, confirmed its cancellation.

== See also ==
- The Winner is... (the Dutch original)
- The Winner Is (adaptation for the U.S.)
