= 8Wonder =

Vietnamese music festival

8Wonder Music Festival
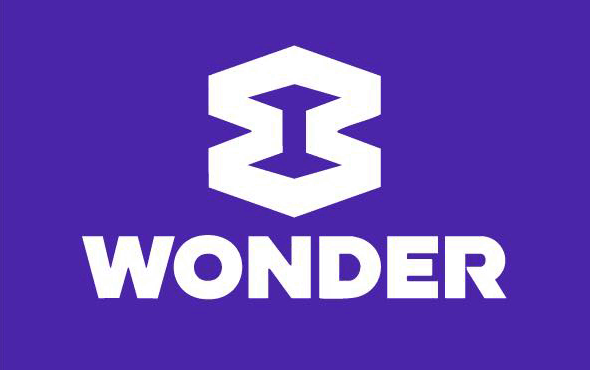
- 8Wonder's logo used since July 2025
- Genre: Pop; V-pop
- Locations: Nha Trang; Phú Quốc; Ho Chi Minh City; Haiphong; Hanoi
- Inaugurated: 2023
- Founders: Vingroup
- Website: 8Wonder

8Wonder is an annual international music festival in Vietnam, developed by Vingroup. The lineup often features international acts as headliners alongside Vietnamese artists. The festival also features interactive entertainment and cultural activities for audiences. The first 8Wonder Music Festival was held on July 22, 2023, in Nha Trang and has been held in various cities of Vietnam ever since.

== Festivals ==
Headliners are highlighted in bold.

List of 8Wonder festivals, including promotional festivals
Year	Date	Title (English)	City	Venue	Line-up	Attendance	Ref.
2023	July 22	8Wonder Music Festival (Vietnamese: Đại nhạc hội 8Wonder)	Nha Trang	VinWonders Nha Trang	**Charlie Puth**; Hà Anh Tuấn; Hồ Ngọc Hà; Hieuthuhai; Mono; Tlinh; Amee	8,000	
2023	December 16	8Wonder Winter Festival 2023	Phú Quốc	Phu Quoc United Center	**Maroon 5** Tóc Tiên; JustaTee; Phương Ly; Double2T; Grey D DJ 2Pillz	11,500	
2024	December 8	8Wonder Winter 2024	Ho Chi Minh City	Vinhomes Grand Park	**Imagine Dragons**; Binz; Soobin; Chi Pu; Hieuthuhai; Quang Hùng MasterD; Hurrykng; Manbo; DJ Mie	20,000	
2025	March 15	Road to 8Wonder: The Next Icon	Haiphong	Royal Square, Vinhomes Royal Island Vũ Yên	**B.I**; Marzuz; Rhyder; Quang Hùng MasterD	—	
2025	August 23	8Wonder: Moments of Wonder (Vietnamese: 8Wonder: Những khoảnh khắc diệu kỳ)	Hanoi	Vietnam Exposition Center	**DJ Snake**; DPR Ian; J Balvin; Hòa Minzy; Soobin; The Kid Laroi; Trong Hieu; Tlinh	50,000	

=== Cancelled festivals ===
List of cancelled 8Wonder festivals
Year	Date	Title	City	Venue	Line-up	Reason for cancellation	Ref.
2024	September 14	8Wonder Moon Festival	Hưng Yên (Note: The city is promoted as Hanoi, disregarding city boundaries.)	Vinhomes Ocean Park 3 (Ocean City)	**Ne-Yo**; **B.I**; Chi Pu; Hieuthuhai; HurryKng; Negav; Low G	2024 Typhoon Yagi in Northern Vietnam	
2025	December 6	8Wonder Winter Festival: Symphony of Stars	Hanoi	Vietnam Exposition Center	**Alicia Keys**; Aespa; Dimash; Văn Mai Hương; Hieuthuhai; MAYDAYs	Unforeseen circumstances	

== 8Wonder World Tour ==
On September 12, 2025, 8Wonder announced 8Wonder World Tour, a subunit that organises concerts, world tours, and other entertainment events featuring international artists in Vietnam. The first world tour organized by 8Wonder is G-Dragon's Übermensch World Tour in Hưng Yên province (promoted as Hanoi) on November 8 and 9.
