= Furies (2022 film) =

Vietnamese action film

- Film poster for theatrical release (Vietnam)
- Directed by: Veronica Ngo
- Screenplay by: Nha Uyen Ly Nguyen; Veronica Ngo; Nguyen Truong
- Starring: Veronica Ngo; Đồng Ánh Quỳnh; Tóc Tiên; Rima Thanh Vy; Thuận Nguyễn; Song Luân
- Production company: Studio 68
- Distributed by: CJ Entertainment, Netflix
- Release date: 23 December 2022 (Vietnam)
- Running time: 109 minutes
- Country: Vietnam
- Language: Vietnamese
- Box office: VND 22.9 billion

Furies (Vietnamese: Thanh Sói - Cúc dại trong đêm) is a 2022 Vietnamese martial arts film produced, directed by, and starring Veronica Ngo, alongside Đồng Ánh Quỳnh, Tóc Tiên, Rima Thanh Vy, Thuận Nguyễn, and Song Luân. It is a prequel to the 2019 film Furie, telling the origin story of that film's villain. Furies was released on 23 December 2022 in Vietnam and was released worldwide on the streaming service Netflix on 23 March 2023.

== Plot ==
Bi lives with her mother Lai, who works as a prostitute to support them. One day, a drunk client arrives at the boat where they are living while Lai is out shopping and decides to rape Bi rather than wait. Lai returns during the rape and furiously pulls him off her daughter; during their ensuing struggle, Bi's mother is killed by the client and in return, Bi stabs the man to death. However, the boat had been set on fire during their fight, leaving her homeless, and she flees to Ho Chi Minh City that night.

After several years of living on the streets in the late 1990s, earning money with odd jobs and pickpocketing, Bi is rescued from an attempted rape and recruited by Jacqueline Hoang (aka "Aunt Lin"), who has trained two other sexual assault survivors, Thanh and Hong, as the "Wild Daisies" vigilante group to protect women. The "Wild Daisies" target gang leader "Mad Dog" Hai, who is notorious for trafficking women and girls to serve in his brothels. Hai, who also manages a casino as his semi-legitimate business, has three principal lieutenants; one serves as a bodyguard ("Half-Blood" Son) and the other two earn money for him by managing an illegal drug trade ("The Dealer" Long) and prostitution ("Scarface" Teo). As the vigilante group bonds while training for, then fighting Hai's gang, they learn that Lin's motives are not as pure-hearted as she said initially: she also is seeking revenge for the murder of her husband and young son, during an attack ordered by Hai that left Lin grievously injured.

After Hong is killed during a raid gone bad and their hideout is uncovered, the "Wild Daisies" succeed in bringing Lin to Hai after fighting their way through the casino, with help from a mole inside Hai's organization. After Lin kills Hai, she reveals her husband was a gang leader who was betrayed by Hai, and Lin has been using the "Wild Daisies" to take over Hai's territory; Lin then orders Thanh to execute Bi and shoots Thanh when she refuses. After Bi kills Lin, she falls unconscious and is arrested, spending the next 15 years in prison. Upon her release, she adopts the street name Thanh Sói.

== Cast ==
- Veronica Ngo as Jacqueline (Lin) Hoang. She is skilled in Vovinam.
- Đồng Ánh Quỳnh as Bi, an orphan
- Tóc Tiên as Thanh
- Rima Thanh Vy as Hong
- Thuận Nguyễn as "Mad Dog" Hai (Hải 'Chó điên')
- Song Luân as "The Dealer" Long (Long 'bồ đà')
- Gi A Nguyễn as "Half-Blood" Son (Sơn 'Lai')
- Phan Thanh Hiền as "Scarface" Teo (Tèo 'mặt sẹo')

== Production ==
The trio portraying the "Wild Daisies" underwent a year of training in martial arts before filming began. Principal filming lasted for 74 days between December 2020 and April 2021. Ngô's first cut of the film was approximately three hours long, but it was trimmed to 109 minutes for the final release.

The original release date was postponed as Ngô was dissatisfied with the visual effects. Due to the protracted editing period, the total cost was rumored to be approximately VND 50–60 billion.

=== Music ===
The film was scored by Nguyen Hoang Anh; several scenes feature V-pop songs from the 1990s to establish the time period:

Popular music featured in Furies
Title	Artist	Year	Notes
"Giã Từ Dĩ Vãng"	Phương Thanh	1998	Plays as Jacqueline arrives home with Lin (00:11)
"Hoa Cúc Dại"	Tóc Tiên	2022	Plays during Bi's makeover scene (00:12)
"Hôn Môi Xa"	Đan Trường	1999	Plays during Hong's 19th birthday party (00:37)
"No Limit"	2 Unlimited	1993	Plays during a scene at the New Century club and casino (00:50)

== Release ==
The film was released in Vietnam on 23 December 2022, then moved to streaming service Netflix for a global release in March 2023.

== Reception ==
The movie was released to positive reviews. Rotten Tomatoes gives the film a score of 88% based on 16 reviews. It had its US premiere at SXSW Film and Television Festival on March 12, 2023.
