= The Winner Is =

- Genre: Game show
- Created by: John de Mol
- Written by: Paul Greenberg
- Directed by: Ivan Dudynsky
- Presented by: Nick Lachey
- Theme music composer: Martijn Schimmer
- Country of origin: United States
- Original language: English
- No. of seasons: 1
- No. of episodes: 7

Production
- Executive producers: John De Mol; Stijn Bakkers; Craig Plestis
- Producers: Patrick Reina; Barton Kimbell; Jeremy Whitham
- Editors: Dennis Schoffstall; Austin Scott
- Running time: 42 minutes
- Production companies: Endemol USA; Talpa Media USA; Smart Dog Media; Universal Television

Original release
- Network: NBC
- Release: June 10 – August 8, 2013

The Winner Is is an American singing competition television series which aired on NBC. Hosted by Nick Lachey, the seven-episode series featured singers of all ages competing for a chance to win $1,000,000. The concept of the show revolved around a series of "battles", in which two contestants compete for the votes of a jury consisting of 101 music professionals. The show premiered on June 10, 2013.

The winner of the series was Katie Ohh, a nurse who won by a 57–44 decision. For her final song, she sang "The Climb". The runner-up was Sharde Bivans, a teacher, who performed "It's a Man's Man's Man's World" in the series' final battle. The other four finalists in the Final 6 were the performers Amy Showalter, Leah Grace, and the vocal groups Senior Sounds of Touch and The LaFontaines.

With a dismal 1.0 rating/3 share among adults 18–49, NBC announced its immediate cancellation on August 6, 2013, with two episodes remaining.

== Format ==
Each episode features six contestants, who may be a single performer or a group, and consists of three rounds.

=== Round 1 ===
In the first round, the six contestants or groups are paired against each other and perform a song of their choice. After each of the contestants or groups have performed their song, each member of the 101-person jury decide who did better. The voting numbers are then revealed, but the contestants are not told which number is theirs.

The host then presents them with an offer of money, and asks them if they think they have lost or won the battle. If they think they have lost, the contestant will press the button to accept the offer - the first contestant to do so receives the cash amount but is immediately eliminated from the competition, with the win being defaulted to their opponent. If no contestants chooses to take the cash offer, the full results are then revealed, and the contestant with fewer votes is eliminated with no winnings.

The contestant with the highest number of votes, out of the three winners, automatically advances to the final round.

=== Round 2 ===
In the second round, the two winners who did not receive the highest number of votes compete against each other in the same format as Round 1, but with a higher cash offer. The winner of this round goes on to the final round.

=== Round 3 ===
In the final round, the remaining two contestants compete against each other, with a higher cash offer than in Round 2. The winner of the final round is declared the winner of the episode, and advances to the series finale.

=== Series finale ===
In the series finale, the six winners from the first six episodes (the Final 6) return to compete for the grand prize. The cash offers in each round are higher than those in the normal episodes, and the winner of the finale wins the $1,000,000 prize.

== Contestants ==
=== Preliminary rounds ===
– The contestant won the round and continued in the competition.
– The contestant won the $1,000,000 prize.
– The contestant lost the round and was eliminated.
– The contestant took the money offer and was eliminated.

==== Episode 1 (June 10, 2013) ====
Money Offered	Song	Competitor 1 (Votes)	Competitor 2 (Votes)	Song
Round 1
$10,000	"Lady Marmalade"	LaKisha Jones (33)	Lito Villareal (68)	"Nessun Dorma"
$10,000	"Domino"	Schae (35)	Kalama Brothers (66)	"More Than Words"
$10,000	"Love Is a Battlefield"	Kirbi Jo Long (5)	Katie Ohh (96)	"Independence Day"
Round 2
$25,000	"Grenade"	Lito Villareal (13)	Kalama Brothers (88)	"Hey, Soul Sister"
Final Round
$50,000	"It's Time"	Kalama Brothers (10)	Katie Ohh (91)	"Breathe"

==== Episode 2 (June 17, 2013) ====
Money Offered	Song	Competitor 1 (Votes)	Competitor 2 (Votes)	Song
Round 1
$10,000	"Proud Mary"	The Newman Twins (31)	Jesse Pringle (70)	"As Long as You Love Me"
$10,000	"Closer"	Ben Nichols (28)	Gina Wagner (73)	"I Want to Be a Cowboy's Sweetheart"
$10,000	"No One"	Legaci (28)	Leah Grace (73)^{1}	"Who's Lovin' You"
Round 2
$25,000	"It Will Rain"	Jesse Pringle (49)	Gina Wagner (52)	"Total Eclipse of the Heart"
Final Round
$50,000	"Born This Way"	Leah Grace (20)	Gina Wagner (81)	"These Boots Are Made For Walkin'"

^{1}Leah Grace and Gina Wagner tied for first place at the end of Round 1. Therefore, the 101 voters were asked to vote for who they would like to see "fast tracked" to the final round. The 101 voters decided with a 59-42 vote that Leah Grace would be "fast tracked". As a result, Gina Wagner was forced to compete in Round 2.

==== Episode 3 (July 11, 2013) ====
Money Offered	Song	Competitor 1 (Votes)	Competitor 2 (Votes)	Song
Round 1
$10,000	"Locked Out of Heaven"	Senior Sounds of Touch (80)	Miranda Rae Mayo (21)	"Set Fire to the Rain"
$10,000	"God Bless the USA"	Kenny Ray Horton (73)	Jesse Mayo (28)	"Glad You Came"
$10,000	"Feeling Good"	The American Bombshells (11)	Douglas Roegiers (90)	"Luck Be a Lady Tonight"
Round 2
$25,000	"I Can’t Help Myself"	Senior Sounds of Touch (68)	Kenny Ray Horton (33)	"Chicken Fried"
Final Round
$50,000	"Ain't That a Kick in the Head?"	Douglas Roegiers (41)	Senior Sounds of Touch (60)	"Get Ready"

==== Episode 4 (July 18, 2013) ====
Money Offered	Song	Competitor 1 (Votes)	Competitor 2 (Votes)	Song
Round 1
$10,000	"Dog Days Are Over"	Agape Love Ensemble (55)	Thomas Wells (46)	"Bless the Broken Road"
$10,000	"Drops of Jupiter"	Matt Beilis (47)	Joanna Jones (54)	"Try"
$10,000	"Fallin'"	The LaFontaines (87)	The TBA Girls (14)	"The Lonely Goatherd"
Round 2
$25,000	"Who Are You"	Agape Love Ensemble (45)	Joanna Jones (56)	"Bleeding Love"
Final Round
$50,000	"Instant Karma!"	Agape Love Ensemble (7)	The LaFontaines (94)	"Run to You"

==== Episode 5 (July 25, 2013) ====
Money Offered	Song	Competitor 1 (Votes)	Competitor 2 (Votes)	Song
Round 1
$10,000	"Hey Ya!"	Crystal Starr & The Bowties (28)	Shaylin Becton (73)	"I Wanna Dance with Somebody"
$10,000	"I'm the Only One"	Amy Showalter (94)	The Cuddlers (7)	"You Make Me Feel..."
$10,000	"Girl on Fire"	Alexa Pantaleo (12)	James Chappell III (89)	"Soul Man"
Round 2
$25,000	"Unwritten"	Shaylin Becton (7)	James Chappell III (94)	"When I Was Your Man"
Final Round
$50,000	"Before He Cheats"	Amy Showalter (45)	James Chappell III (56)	"Breakeven"

==== Episode 6 (August 1, 2013) ====
Money Offered	Song	Competitor 1 (Votes)	Competitor 2 (Votes)	Song
Round 1
$10,000	"Alone"	Vanessa Echevarria (42)	Annie McQueen (59)	"(You Make Me Feel Like) A Natural Woman"
$10,000	"Harder to Breathe"	Duwende (59)	Carson Henley (42)	"When You Were Young"
$10,000	"Born To Be Wild"	Charles Glenn (19)	Sharde Bivans (82)	"I'm Going Down"
Round 2
$25,000	"Someone Like You"	Annie McQueen (33)	Duwende (68)	"Man In the Mirror"
Final Round
$50,000	"Blown Away"	Sharde Bivans (61)	Duwende (40)	"You Get What You Give"

==== Episode 7 – Finale (August 8, 2013) ====
Money Offered	Song	Competitor 1 (Votes)	Competitor 2 (Votes)	Song
Round 1
$50,000	"This Will Be (An Everlasting Love)"	The LaFontaines (19)	Katie Ohh (82)	"Cry"
$50,000	"Ain't Too Proud to Beg"	Senior Sounds of Touch (74)	Leah Grace (27)	"Price Tag"
$50,000	"Gunpowder & Lead"	Amy Showalter (13)	Sharde Bivans (88)	"I Have Nothing"
Round 2
$100,000	"You and I"	Katie Ohh (84)	Senior Sounds of Touch (17)	"What Makes You Beautiful"
Final Round
$200,000	"It's a Man's Man's Man's World"	Sharde Bivans (44)	Katie Ohh (57)	"The Climb"

== Artists who appeared on previous shows ==
- Lakisha Jones competed on the sixth season of American Idol. She finished in fourth place.
- Kai Kalama of the Kalama Brothers competed on the eighth season of American Idol. He was eliminated in the Top 36.

== U.S. Nielsen ratings ==
Episode list

No#	Episode	Air date	Ratings	Rating/share 18–49	Viewers (millions)	Note
1	6 Songs to a Million	June 10, 2013		1.9/6	6.59	
2	Million Dollar Mistake	June 17, 2013		1.9/5	6.68	
3	Million Dollar Dreams	July 11, 2013		1.1/3	4.03	
4	Million Dollar Surprise	July 18, 2013		0.9/3	3.89	
5	Million Dollar Shock	July 25, 2013		0.9/3	3.84	
6	Million Dollar Temptation	August 1, 2013		1.0/3	4.29	
7	Million Dollar Finale	August 8, 2013		1.4/4	5.19	

== International versions ==
Countries/regions	Title	Host	Network	Top prize	Premiere
Netherlands (original version)	The Winner is...	Beau van Erven Dorens	SBS 6	€1,000,000	January 26, 2012
(Arab League) Arab world	The Winner Is...	Nadia Bassat	Al-Hayat; Dubai TV; LBCI	US$500,000	Season 1 : September 21, 2013
Brazil	O Melhor	Ratinho	SBT	R$10,000	Season 1 : May 4, 2022
China	女人如歌; Nuren ru ge	Qiū Qǐmíng & Zhū Dān	Hunan TV	Unknown	Season 1 : November 2, 2012
France	The Winner Is	Benjamin Castaldi	TF1	€100,000	Season 1 : August 2, 2014
Germany	The Winner Is...	Linda de Mol	Sat.1	€1,000,000	Season 1 : April 12, 2012
Italy	The Winner Is...	Gerry Scotti	Canale 5	€150,000	Season 1 : November 17, 2012; Season 2 : June 15, 2017
Nigeria	Star The Winner Is...	Uti Nwachukwu	Africa Magic	₦10,000,000	Season 1 : July 19, 2014
Russia	Победитель; Pobedytel'	Dmitry Nagiyev	Channel One	₽3,000,000	Season 1 : May 19, 2017 – August 4, 2017
Thailand	The Winner Is Thailand	Sarawut Martthong	Channel 3	฿10,000,000	Season 1 : April 13, 2014; Season 2 : April 5, 2015
Turkey	Ve Kazanan	Uraz Kaygılaroğlu	Star TV	₺500,000	Season 1 : February 21, 2015
Vietnam	Tôi là... người chiến thắng	Bình Minh (season 1); Hoài Linh (season 2); Đại Nghĩa (season 3, ep 2); Ngô Kiến Huy, Vũ Ngọc Hoàng Oanh (season 3, ep 1)	HTV; Hanoi TV	300,000,000 ₫	Season 1 : May 25, 2013; Season 2 : July 12, 2014; Season 3 : July 11, 2015
