= Đen Vâu =

Vietnamese rapper and songwriter (born 1989)

Đen
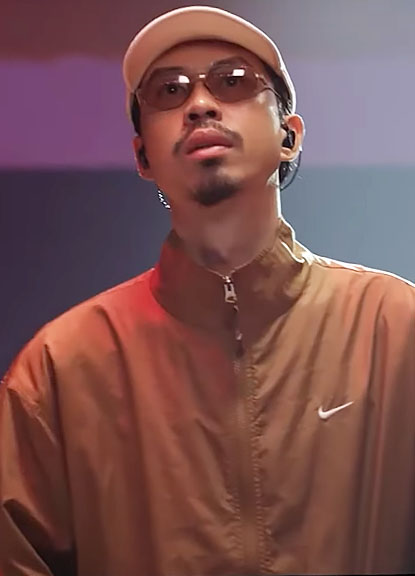
- Đen in 2021

Background information
- Born: Nguyễn Đức Cường; May 13, 1989 (age 37); Đồng Nai province, Vietnam
- Origin: Hạ Long, Quảng Ninh province, Vietnam
- Occupations: Rapper; songwriter; television presenter
- Years active: 2009–present
- Website: dventertainment.vn

Nguyễn Đức Cường (born 13 May 1989), commonly known by his stage name Đen or Đen Vâu, is a Vietnamese rapper, songwriter, and television presenter. He has been described as "one of the few artists who succeeded from the underground music and indie music wave" in Vietnam, and a recipient of several accolades.

== Early life ==
Nguyễn Đức Cường was born in 1989 in Đồng Nai. His father is from Hưng Yên, and his mother is from Hải Dương. In a previous interview with Billboard Vietnam, Đen Vâu revealed that his ancestral hometown is in Phần Hà, Bắc Sơn, Ân Thi, Hưng Yên. Since high school, he became acquainted with rap by chance. He often wrote rap lyrics in his notebooks, practiced singing, and participated in rap performances at school events. After finishing high school, due to financial hardship, he had to stop studying.

He worked for the management board of Hạ Long Bay in Quảng Ninh Province for seven years. During that time, he took unpaid leave to help his younger brother open a café. The café venture failed, with him returning to work to cover the maintenance costs until the café officially closed in 2016. After repaying his debts, he wrote the song "Ngày lang thang" (lit. "Wandering day"), marking a shift toward more positive thinking. Explaining his stage name, he said: "When I was a kid, a neighbor called me ‘Đen' because of my dark skin. Later, when I started making music, people called me ‘Đen Vâu,' so I kept it. Ugly names are easy to raise."

== Career ==
=== 2011–2017: Beginnings, rise to fame with Đưa nhau đi trốn and Kobukovu ===
In 2011, Đen and Võ Việt Phương wrote the song Cây bàng to participate in Bài hát Việt 2011. The song later won the "Impressive Song of August" award and the "Audience's Favorite Song" at the final show.

In 2014, Đen wrote the song Đưa nhau đi trốn and sent it to Linh Cáo, a friend from Huế he met on an online forum. They recorded the track separately—Đen in Quảng Ninh and Linh Cáo in Huế. After being shared online, it became a viral hit and brought him recognition. The song later won the "Most Favorite Rap/Hip-hop Song" at the Zing Music Awards 2015.

In May 2016, Đen and several friends traveled across Vietnam by motorbike from Hanoi, performing free shows at six different locations. He later said he announced it only on his personal page to gauge audience support. After the two-week journey, he was invited to perform professionally and decided to pursue music.

Đen contributed two of the fifteen tracks to the film soundtrack Mùa viết tình ca: "Mày đang kiếm cái gì" and "Ngày khác lạ" (with Giang Phạm and Triple D). Both songs were noted for their realism and rawness while fitting the film's tone. He released his debut extended play Kobukovu in August 2016 and followed it with the songs Đi theo bóng mặt trời and Ta cứ đi cùng nhau in 2017.

=== 2018–2019: "Anh đếch cần gì nhiều ngoài em", "Đố em biết anh đang nghĩ gì", "Hai triệu năm" and first Show của Đen ===
In November 2018, Đen released the song "Anh đếch cần gì nhiều ngoài em". The track caught the attention of young audiences for its unusual title, while the vocals of Đen and Vũ were notable highlights. Within half a day, the song became a social-media phenomenon and entered YouTube's Trending Top chart. These statistics were impressive for an underground music release. The song earned Đen the Rap/Hiphop/R&B Song of the Year award at the 2018 Keeng Young Awards, as well as Most Popular Underground Product and Breakthrough Artist of the Year at the 2018 We Choice Awards.

Đen also performed at his own acoustic show alongside programs such as See Sing Share by Hà Anh Tuấn, Lam Trường 9pm Live , and Hợp âm gió by Mỹ Linh. He currently has a fan base comparable to A-list stars and mainstream pop singers.

Throughout 2018, Đen also released other songs such as "Ngày khác lạ," "Đừng gọi anh là idol," and "Đố em biết anh đang nghĩ gì" (featuring JustaTee).

At the beginning of 2019, he released the song "Mười năm," marking ten years of pursuing rap. The music video was described as simple in style, visually and musically reflecting Đen's decade-long journey with rap, weaving together themes of friendship, joy, sadness, praise, and criticism. In the song's ending, Đen uses the pronoun "tao," implying defiance. "Mười năm" was co-written by Đen and Lynk Lee. Its main content centers on a person's experiences through ups and downs, friendship, and nostalgia. The track was later selected as the soundtrack for the 2021 film Rừng thế mạng. According to Zing News , the use of "tao" in the song's lyrics was unnecessary and somewhat confrontational, similar to the slang tone in "Anh đếch cần gì nhiều ngoài em." The article also noted that singer Ngọc Linh's sweet voice balanced Đen's rebellious energy. It further commented that while the song followed Đen's usual writing style, its rhymes, metaphors, and use of proper names were notably creative.

In May 2019, Đen released "Bài này chill phết," a duet with Min. He said he wrote the song six months earlier after reuniting with old friends and reflecting on his musical path. The song has three sections, each describing different emotions and moods, which made naming it difficult. He chose "Bài này chill phết" to evoke a relaxed, uplifting feeling for listeners. The song was later listed among the top 10 most popular songs of the year, and Đen became the first rapper to win Male Singer of the Year at the 2019 Làn Sóng Xanh Awards.

On June 19, 2019, Đen released the track "Hai triệu năm." The music video was filmed spontaneously during a company trip, with singer Biên joining the song by chance, though it was still shot with professional equipment. During filming, Đen submerged himself underwater for five hours. His image in the MV led fans to edit photos comparing him to the Loch Ness monster. The video was noted for its simplicity yet striking visuals, depicting Đen immersed in the sea under calm and rainy conditions. The lyrics were praised for their inventive rhyming and spontaneous wordplay, which helped the song go viral online. It also referenced several world figures, while Biên's vocals added a unique contrast. Đen received the Inspiring Singer award at the We Choice Awards and Breakthrough Image of the Year at the 2019 ELLE Style Awards.

On October 21, 2019, Đen returned to V-pop with two songs, "Lối nhỏ" and "Cảm ơn." These were gifts to his fans ahead of his live concert Show của Đen, held on November 9 at the Military Zone 7 Stadium. The show, marking his 10-year career anniversary, attracted 5,000 attendees.

=== 2022–present: Gieo quẻ, Đi Trong Mùa Hè, debut album Dongvui harmony & second liveshow Show of Đen ===
In 2022, Đen collaborated with Hoàng Thùy Linh on the song "Gieo quẻ". He also joined singers Tùng Dương, Hồ Ngọc Hà, Văn Mai Hương and Issac to perform the official song of SEA Games 31, "Hãy tỏa sáng (Let's Shine)", composed by Huy Tuấn, for which he also contributed lyrics.

On May 9, 2022, Đen and composer Trần Tiến released the music video "Đi Trong Mùa Hè". The song was created to encourage Vietnam's national football teams. Its lyrics evoke the vibrant atmosphere of post-match street celebrations ("đi bão") and the enthusiasm of Vietnamese fans cheering for their team. The MV features three famous Vietnamese football players: Quế Ngọc Hải, Đoàn Văn Hậu, and Đỗ Duy Mạnh. The project was strongly supported by the Vietnam Football Federation. Despite controversy, "Đi Trong Mùa Hè" reached No. 1 on YouTube Trending just one day after release.

On June 11, 2022, Đen released the rap track "Ai muốn nghe không", part of his personal project *Lộn Xộn* and the fifth entry in the series. The song reflects Đen's emotions following the release of "Đi Trong Mùa Hè".

On September 12, 2022, Đen released "Diễn viên tồi", produced as a live session where he performed with a band alongside vocalist Thành Bùi and backing group Cadillac. In addition to Đen's long hair and nostalgic styling, the MV stood out for its meaningful portrayal of love through a sequence of connected paintings.

He released his first live-recorded album Dongvui Harmony in November of the same year. The 40-minute video, filmed in a theater, features eight of Đen Vâu's hit songs, ranging from earlier works such as Mơ, Anh đếch cần gì nhiều ngoài em, Bài này chill phết to more recent tracks like Mang tiền về cho mẹ and Ai muốn nghe không. After its release on the evening of November 9, the album entered YouTube's trending chart with nearly 500,000 views. He later appeared as a guest on the second season of Cuộc hẹn cuối tuần and donated all of his performance fees to support children in the Cặp lá yêu thương program.

In 2023, Đen collaborated with Cheng to release Luôn yêu đời. Though not highly groundbreaking, the release showed noticeable changes in his work. The song conveys a positive message, with a music video that blends cheerfulness and nostalgia. Its varied melody keeps listeners engaged. Additionally, the rapper took a bold step by collaborating with Cheng, a relatively new voice in the music scene. In April 2023, Đen announced that he would hold his live concert Show của Đen on May 27 in Hanoi.

On May 13, 2023, Đen Vâu released the song Nấu ăn cho em, donating its proceeds to build schools and support children. The visuals and lyrics depict Đen's special journey with friends to visit children at the Sá Tổng boarding school for ethnic minority primary and secondary students in Mường Chà District, Điện Biên Province. He stated that the latest proceeds from Nấu ăn cho em were used to fund four computer rooms for underprivileged children and disclosed that from October 1, 2023, to January 31, 2024, the song had generated over 369 million VND in revenue. This included both video and audio income. He also revealed that two computer rooms had been completed at schools in Sá Tổng (Điện Biên) and Tương Dương (Nghệ An). Đen's second live show in Hanoi drew more than 10,000 attendees—twice the audience of Show của Đen held four years earlier in Ho Chi Minh City. He returned with Miền đất hứa, a collaboration with Hoàng Thùy Linh, on November 27, marking their next joint release after the 2022 music video Gieo quẻ.

Đen was among the ten recipients of the 2023 National Volunteer Award, announced by the Central Committee of the Ho Chi Minh Communist Youth Union. Earlier, he had donated 690 million VND to build two schools in Sơn La and Điện Biên provinces, and contributed over 160 million VND to the "Nuôi Em" program, supporting 30 students over four years. Through his music, particularly Nấu ăn cho em, he mobilized community support via YouTube, raising more than 1 billion VND to build two additional schools in Lai Châu and Cao Bằng provinces. He also sponsored the "Spring Journey – Tết Reunion 2024" program by the Ho Chi Minh City Student Support Center, funding transportation for 2,000 disadvantaged students to return home for Tết. At the 29th Mai Vàng Awards, he received two honors: Artist for the Community 2023 and Male Singer/Rapper, recognizing his impactful charitable projects. He was also honored by the Ministry of Culture, Sports and Tourism as Artist for the Community of 2023 for his song Nấu ăn cho em.

On March 4, 2024, Đen Vâu released a musical project titled Nhạc của rừng in collaboration with Hiền VK (real name Nguyễn Thu Hiền), a vocal coach and member of the VK backing group. The song aimed to encourage tree planting, environmental protection, and greater awareness of ecological issues. Đen was named one of the ten Outstanding Young Faces of Vietnam in 2023 by the Central Committee of the Ho Chi Minh Communist Youth Union. He also received two awards at the 2024 Cống hiến Awards: Music Video of the Year for Nấu ăn cho em and Male Singer of the Year. On June 25, he released a new song titled Friendship, centered on the theme of camaraderie and featuring a choir of his friends. Through this song, Đen sought to convey a positive message about the strength of friendship. In December, he released Triệu điều nhỏ xíu xiêu lòng featuring Kim Long, a heartfelt song that moved many listeners with its uplifting message about finding meaning in life's simple moments.

At the beginning of 2025, Đen Vâu released the song Vị nhà, marking his return to Tết-themed music after a three-year hiatus. The song resonated with audiences through its simple yet profound lyrics and a melody that blends traditional and modern elements. In August, he released Lãng đãng, a song about appreciating life and learning to cherish peaceful moments.
