= Issac =

Issac is a spelling variant of the name Isaac.

Issac may refer to:

== Given name ==
- Issac Bailey, American writer
- Issac Blakeney (born 1992), American football wide receiver
- Issac Booth (born 1971), American football player
- Issac Ryan Brown (born 2005), American child actor and singer
- Issac Delgado (born 1962), Cuban-Spanish musician, and salsa performer
- Issac Koga (1899–1982), Japanese electronics researcher/engineer
- Issac Luke (born 1987), New Zealand rugby league hooker
- Issac Osae (born 1993), Ghanaian footballer

== Surname ==
- Osthatheos Issac (born 1976), Syriac Orthodox bishop
- Rod Issac (born 1989), American football cornerback

== Other ==
- Issac, Dordogne, a commune in France
- Issacs Building, in Los Angeles, California

== See also ==
- Isaac (name)
- Isaac (disambiguation)
