= Quang Hùng MasterD =

Vietnamese singer-songwriter and record producer

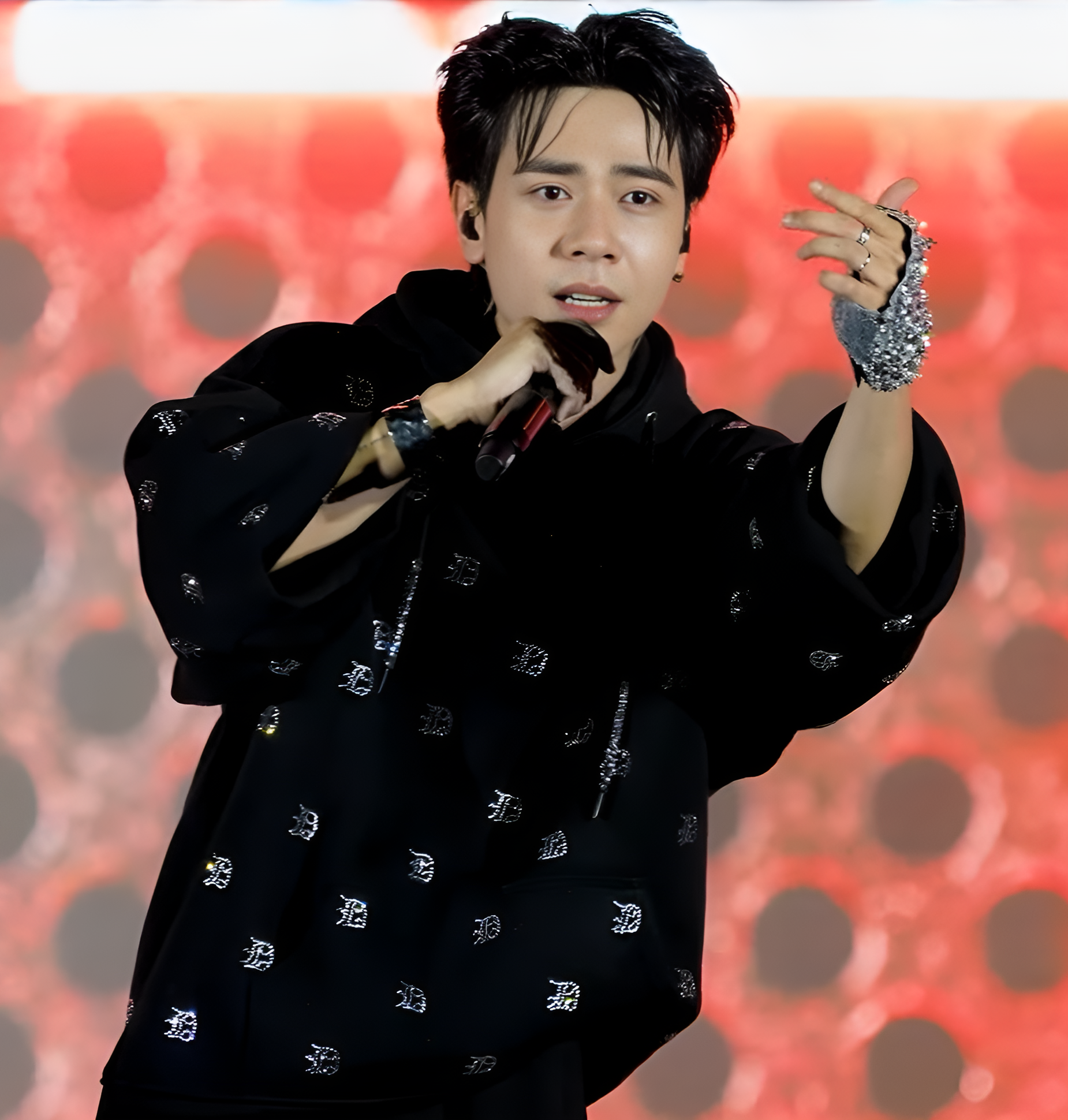
- Born: Lê Quang Hùng; 7 October 1997 (age 28); Huế, Vietnam
- Years active: 2010–present

Lê Quang Hùng (born 7 October 1997), commonly known by his stage name Quang Hùng MasterD, is a Vietnamese singer, songwriter, rapper and record producer. He first became an internet phenomenon when he posted a mashup of 30 V-pop hits in 2015, then officially debuted to the audience when participating in the show The Debut.

Quang Hung MasterD is widely known in Thailand through a few songs such as "De den de di" and "Thuy trieu", but his name only really became more prominent in Vietnam after participating in the show Anh trai "say hi" and entering the lineup of the best five-member group. He won the sympathy of the audience thanks to his good performance and songwriting skills, innocent and lovely personality and is considered one of the singers with great potential in the future.

== Life and career ==
=== 1997-2016: Childhood and the beginning of a career ===
Born in Hue city, Quang Hung MasterD inherited his love of music from his biological father from a young age. He started composing and making music on his own in 2010, and a year later he went to a friend to learn how to make remix music. During this time, he had to both make music for clients and take advantage of opportunities to produce his own music under difficult conditions, he even sneaked to the Internet cafe to make music so much that he was punished for being misunderstood as being playful. Later, realizing his son's passion, the family bought him his first computer on the condition that he would not neglect his studies; the computer was later used by his younger brothers at home to produce music. Besides music, Quang Hung also loves lion dance and has participated in a lion dance team in the area.

In 2013, he joined HowFEEL Production - a small music group operating in Hue - where he regularly sang cover versions of hits by famous singers with his friends and posted them on social media. At the same time, Hung also spent time practicing his singing and composing music; he composed his first song, "Silent Gaze," in 2015.

Quang Hung began receiving attention from the online community in 2016, when he appeared with his friend Ho Minh Triet (Rum) in a nearly 7-minute mashup video of 30 V-pop songs that they both made. The video quickly attracted over 1 million views on YouTube and tens of thousands of shares at the time, and Quang Hung MasterD was recognized as an "internet phenomenon". Within half a year, he stopped studying at Hue Academy of Music to go to Ho Chi Minh City to pursue his career and joined the company of music producer Only C.

=== 2018-2020: Participated in The Debut and then pursued an independent career ===
In 2018, Hung participated in the reality TV show Project No. 1 – The Debut and left an impression as a shy, somewhat insecure boy on stage. He was advised by judge Hoang Thuy Linh to be nervous on stage and to enjoy the music instead of worrying too much. Making it to the top 30 of the program, Quang Hung was placed in the group for the "Pioneer stage" and performed his self-composed song "Lỡ lầm" in the next round. Although the judges gave quite good comments on his vocal handling and modern musical style, this performance could not help him go further in the program. After leaving the competition, he released the song "Why hasn't anyone come back yet" in collaboration with Rum, and also participated in composing many other songs such as "Because love is remembering" (Han Sara), "I accidentally fell in love with the wrong guy" (Jin Ju), "Being friends means not being able to love" (Lou Hoang).

After more than two years of making music, Quang Hung decided to leave Only C's company in 2019 to pursue a singing career. He then went to work for a new entertainment company, but after only a few months, the company ceased operations. In a difficult situation, and seemingly about to return to Hue, he wrote the song "Don't Cry Alone" that night to encourage himself, and immediately someone in the production team of the web drama "Young Master's Servant" contacted him to buy his song for the soundtrack. The money from selling the song helped him cover his expenses to stay in the city for a while longer. Later, he released another song "Don't Cry Because of Me" composed by Tang Duy Tan; both songs created quite a good effect and contributed to the initial success of Quang Hung MasterD.

However, not long after the two aforementioned songs, Quang Hung continued to lose his appeal quickly. He himself fell into a state of uncertainty, vague about his career future, and many nights he wandered the streets and slept in parks because he no longer had money for rent. For 6–7 years, he repeatedly had to perform at events without receiving any payment, paying for all his makeup and travel expenses himself. He was even diagnosed with autonomic nervous system disorder just because he stayed home making music for too long.

=== 2020-2024: "Easy to come, easy to go" and operations in Thailand ===
A career turning point came for Quang Hung MasterD in early 2021, following the unexpected popularity of his song "Easy to Come, Easy to Go," which he composed and performed. When it was first released in November 2020, the song didn't immediately gain traction in the domestic market, but within a few months it quickly spread across social media in Thailand, being widely shared by many users there and becoming a TikTok trend. The song then went on to become popular in several Southeast Asian countries such as Cambodia, Laos, and Myanmar; even in China, "Easy to Come, Easy to Go" was translated and performed by Ju Jingyi and Hou Minghao at a major event in the country. Thanks to the song's popularity, Quang Hung became a beloved and highly sought-after figure in Thailand; his fan community called Muzik also grew accordingly. The money earned from the artwork was used to help his family pay off debts incurred from a failed business.

On May 24, 2022, he released the music video (MV) "Last Dark" in collaboration with Thai rapper F. Hero, with Xoài Non acting in the MV. The song was written in Vietnamese lyrics but the melody was arranged and orchestrated with a strong Thai flavor. This is considered a further step for the male singer towards the Thai market, where he has a large fan base after "Easy to Come Easy to Go". On his 25th birthday in 2022, Quang Hùng MasterD held his first mini-concert in Bangkok called The Journey of Memories to look back on his journey to music and to thank his fans. Also during the show, he announced a collaboration with singer Wha Wha to release a new song "Oscar". In June 2023, he released the MV for the song "The Day of Separation (Losing)", a composition he and musician Do Nguyen Phuc wrote in 2020. Initially, he planned to create a music video in a historical, past-life style based on the folk instrument sounds of the song, but later the entire storyline for the video was changed with scenes filmed in Thailand, and the music was modified but still retained its folk style. This is also the video where he co-starred with Thai actress Noah Naphat. Quang Hung has won the Asia Top Awards in Thailand twice in a row in 2023 and 2024, both in the category of promising young singer/artist.

=== 2024-present: "Tide", "Anh trai say hi", reception in Vietnam and debut album ===
In early 2024, he returned to the music scene with his new song "Tidal Wave," a composition inspired by a natural phenomenon to symbolize romantic love. First performed in the 2 Days 1 Night Season 2 program, the song was released on the 3rd day of the Lunar New Year (February 12, 2024) and reached number 1 on Zing MP3's #zingchart within the first two hours. The MV Visualizer version of the song also reached top 1 on YouTube Vietnam's trending music category after a week of release with about 2.5 million views, becoming a new trend on TikTok thanks to its catchy, easy-to-dance melody. With this event, Sports & Culture commented that "it seems that the Vietnamese public is 'pulling' the Vietnamese singer, who has been very popular with Thai youth in recent years, back to the domestic music market." Following that, on May 14, he continued to release the MV "Hail" – another song with a weather theme and connected to the singer's story during the stagnation period due to the COVID-19 pandemic; this song, along with "Tide," was announced as the lead singles for an upcoming album.

In June 2024, Quang Hung MasterD participated in the first season of the reality TV show Anh trai "say hi". Throughout the episodes of "Anh trai "say hi"", he demonstrated his songwriting ability, good musical thinking, and natural, captivating stage performance style, and was a key contributor to many popular songs in the show. In the second round, Quang Hung performed the song "Catch Me If You Can" with Negav, Nicky, and Cong Duong, in which he composed the melody. Although he was only ranked last among the four songs in the same round, the song garnered over 7.2 million views on YouTube after one week of release, becoming the first performance in the show to reach number one on the platform's trending chart – an achievement that helped "Catch Me If You Can" receive the "Most Viewed and Listened to Song" award (The Best Hit) with totaling over two billion views across multiple platforms.

In the final night, he performed his self-composed song "Tie You Up" for the individual competition. The song had many cultural influences, with rap lyrics in Hue accent in the middle of the song and a Thai-style dance at the end of the performance. In the group competition, in his first and only time being given the role of team captain, he performed "First Love Too Drunk" with members Negav, Erik, and Phap Kieu. After only four days of airing, "First Love Too Drunk" rose to the top of the trending music chart on YouTube Vietnam with about 2.6 million views, taking the ranking from his own individual song "Tie You Up". In the end, he won a spot in the winning group called "Brother" "Best 5", alongside the other names including Isaac and Duc Phuc, Hieuthuhai and Rhyder.

After the show, he, along with Dương Domic, JSOL, and HURRYKNG, formed the band MOPIUS on November 26, 2024, operating under the management of NOMAD MGMT Vietnam, a member company of DatVietVAC Group Holdings. The group released their debut single titled "Priority Lane" on December 3. The overwhelming success from the "Drunk Brother" show also helped Quang Hung increase his fame significantly in the country, frequently appearing and receiving attention in many major programs and events. He successfully organized the first fan meeting series in Vietnam with a total of five nights of performances (two in Ho Chi Minh City, one in Hanoi, one in Da Nang, and one in Can Tho), attracting thousands of fans to attend. During his fourth fan meeting in Da Nang on February 22, 2025, he officially introduced the MV for his new song "Investing in the Heart," a combination of pop and R&B genres, featuring the female lead in the video. They are seen as representing Muzik - the fans the singer wants to express his gratitude to.

In June 2025, Quang Hung MasterD was the only Vietnamese artist to participate and perform at the VPBank K-Star Spark in Vietnam music festival held at My Dinh National Stadium (Hanoi) along with many famous artists from Korea. In the first concert of the Em xinh "say hi" program on September 13 in Ho Chi Minh City, he and the Mopius group introduced their second single titled "Design" after almost a year since the release of the song "Lan ưu tiên". On November 22, the male singer announced the official release of his first album in his career titled Bloomever, which includes 12 songs including previously released songs such as "Hao huyen", "Thuy trieu" or "Tha anh ra" along with completely new compositions. Immediately after its release, the entire physical version of the album quickly sold out in two sales rounds, and the album topped the iTunes Vietnam Top Album chart after one day. Along with that, Quang Hung announced he would return to Bangkok to hold his sixth fan meeting on December 20, concluding his fan meeting activities for the year.

== Public image ==
Quang Hung MasterD has a fan community called "Muzik," established in 2016. When Quang Hung's name became famous in Thailand, the fan support activities there were very lively, including a series of promotional campaigns for the male singer at large shopping malls on his birthday in 2021. From April 2024, Quang Hung owned his own company called MasterD Entertainment, which he co-founded with a friend. On the occasion of the 50th anniversary of the reunification of the country, his family, together with Muzik and the magazine Brand and Public Opinion, organized the giving of 60 gifts to Vietnamese Heroic Mothers, veterans, and families of wounded soldiers and martyrs in Vy Da, Thuy Van, and Thuan Loc wards of Hue city.

== Personal life ==
Quang Hung has a younger brother named Le Quang Huy (born in 2003), a singer with the stage name Ryn Lee.

== Controversies ==
=== Copyright dispute with Drum7 and Xuan Dinh K.Y. ===
Quang Hung MasterD was involved in a copyright dispute with music producer Drum7 and singer-songwriter Xuan Dinh K.Y in October 2024, concerning the songs "Easy to Come, Easy to Go", "Tie Her Up", and "First Love Too Drunk". The incident began when Xuan Dinh K.Y posted a video of himself singing a part of the song "First Love Too Drunk" on TikTok and claimed he had composed two verses for the song; this is also the song that Quang Hung MasterD's group performed on the show "Brother Say Hi", in which Quang Hung revealed that he wrote the lyrics from 2 AM and finished in three hours.

== Discography ==
=== Singles ===
Title	Year	Album
"Sao Em Vẫn Chưa Về" (feat RUM)	2018	Non-album singles
"Xuân An Lành"	2019	Non-album singles
"Thiệp Cưới Trên Bàn"	2019	Non-album singles
"Nỗi Nhớ Lặng Im"	2019	Non-album singles
"Đừng Vì Anh Mà Khóc"	2019	Non-album singles
"Dễ Đến Dễ Đi"	2020	Non-album singles
"Gotcha (Đã Có Anh)"	2021	Non-album singles
"Cảm Ơn Em Đã Đến"	2021	Non-album singles
"Chỉ Còn Một Đêm (Last Dark) (feat F.HERO)"	2022	Non-album singles
"Ngày Biệt Ly (Losing)"	2023	Non-album singles
"Thủy Triều"	2024	Non-album singles
"Mưa Đá"	2024	Non-album singles
"Ngày Trong Xanh"	2024	Non-album singles
"Hão Huyền"	2024	Non-album singles
"Ánh Mắt Biết Cười (feat Tăng Duy Tân)	2025	Non-album singles
"Đầu Tư Cho Trái Tim"	2025	Non-album singles
"Thả Anh Ra"	2025	Non-album singles
