= Quốc Bảo =

Vietnamese songwriter and record producer

- Birth name: Bùi Quốc Bảo
- Born: June 30, 1967 (age 58)
- Origin: Vietnam
- Occupation(s): songwriter, producer, art critic
- Instrument: Guitar
- Labels: QB Music

Bùi Quốc Bảo, stagename simply Quốc Bảo (born June 30, 1967) is a Vietnamese songwriter and record producer. He became a prominent songwriter in Vietnam in the late 1990s and noted as producer who helps launch new artists.
