= Hà Anh Tuấn =

Vietnamese singer (born 1984)

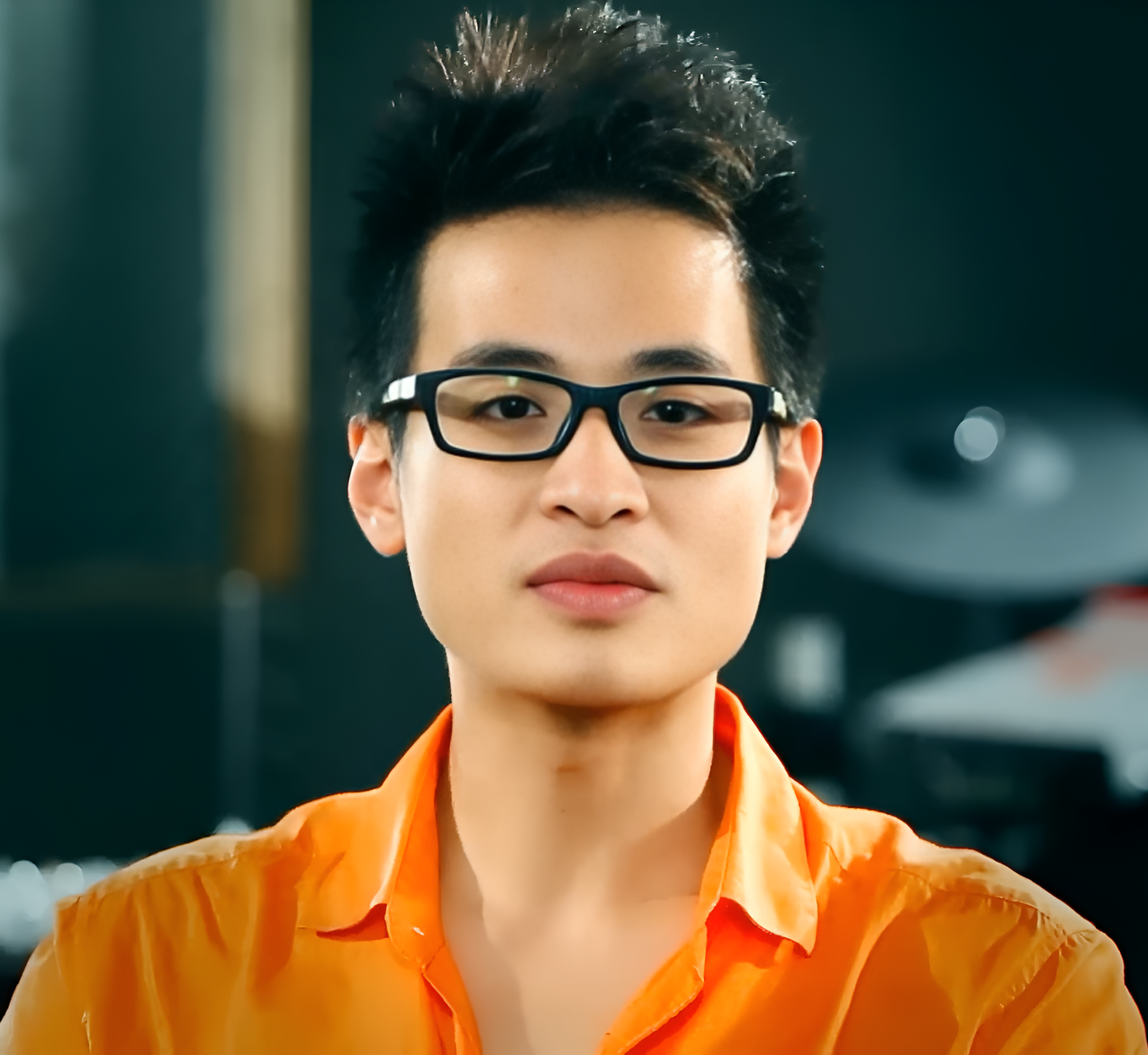
- Hà Anh Tuấn in 2012

Background information
- Born: December 17, 1984 (age 41); Ho Chi Minh City, Vietnam
- Occupations: Singer, businessman
- Years active: 2006–present

Hà Anh Tuấn (born December 17, 1984) is a Vietnamese male singer. He became famous when he entered the top 3 of Sao Mai điểm hẹn singing contest.

== Biography ==
Hà Anh Tuấn was born in Ho Chi Minh City. His parents are from Ninh Bình. He is an alumnus of Lê Hồng Phong High School for the Gifted.

When he was a student, Tuấn participated in various art-related activities of his school and the city. In 2002, he won the first prize in the city's "Student Singing Festival".

After graduating from high school, Tuấn went studying abroad at Technische Universität Darmstadt.

== Career ==
In 2006, after completing his study in Germany, Hà Anh Tuấn returned to Vietnam to participate in the Sao Mai điểm hẹn singing contest held by Vietnam Television (VTV). In that contest, he won the promising singer award and was one of the top 3 most popular singers – alongside singer Hoàng Hải and rocker Phạm Anh Khoa.

After his success at Sao Mai điểm hẹn, he decided to pursue a professional singing career.

In 2007, Tuấn released his first album, Cafe sáng – which consists of 9 songs composed by musicians Võ Thiện Thanh and Hồ Hoài Anh.

In 2008, he was the MC for Phạm Duy's liveshow "Con đường tình ta đi", which was organized by Phuong Nam Film Studio at Hòa Bình Theater.

== Discography ==
=== Studio albums ===
- Café sáng (2007)
- Saigon Radio (2008)
- Acous'84 (2010)
- Cock-tail (2010)
- Lava (2014)
- Streets Rhythm (2015)
- Fragile (2017)
- Truyện ngắn (2019)
- Cuối ngày người đàn ông một mình (2020)

=== Album released in the US ===
- Chân dung (2012)
- Biết tương tư (2013)
- Veston: The Golden Melodies (2018)

=== Promotional albums ===
- Acoustic Guitar: Mơ tóc (2008)

=== Singles ===
Year	Name	Type	Note
2013	"Chuyện của mùa đông"	Single	From Fragile
2014	"Hai giọt nước"	Single	with Phương Linh
2016	"Người"	Single	From Fragile
2016	"Tháng tư là lời nói dối của em"	EP	From Fragile
2017	"Cuộc đời là những bước chân"	Single	with Bích Phương
2017	"Mình yêu nhau yêu nhau bình yên thôi!"	Single	with Đinh Hương
2017	"Người tình mùa đông"'	Single	
2017	"Nơi ấy bình yên"	Single	
2018	"Mẹ chỉ mong Tết về"	Single	

=== Music projects ===
- See Sing Share 1 (10 episodes)
- See Sing Share 2 – The Love Land (10 episodes)
- See Sing Share 3 – Sweet Memories (10 episodes)
- See Sing Share 4 – Trong rừng có cơn mát lành (9 episodes)

== Liveshow ==
- December 17, 2016: Liveshow Café in Concert – Nâu nóng at Hanoi Palace of Culture.
- December 22, 2016: Liveshow Café in Concert – Sữa đá at The Youth Cultural Center of Ho Chi Minh City.
- September 9–10, 2017: Liveshow Fragile Live Concert at Hanoi Palace of Culture.
- November 30, 2017: Liveshow Fragile+ Live Concert in Saigon at White Palace, Ho Chi Minh City.
- April 7, 2018: Liveshow See Sing Share Concert: Romance – Người đàn ông & bông hoa trên ngực trái at Vietnam National Convention Center, Hanoi.
- April 14, 2018: Liveshow See Sing Share Concert: Romance – Người đàn ông & bông hoa trên ngực trái at Hoa Binh Theater, Ho Chi Minh City.
- December 23, 2018: Liveshow See Sing Share Concert – Gấu at Da Lat Pedagogical College, Lâm Đồng.
- September 13–14, 2019: Live Concert: Truyện ngắn – Hội An at Hội An Theater, Quảng Nam.
- October 12, 2019: Live Concert: Truyện ngắn at Hòa Bình Theater, Ho Chi Minh City.
- October 26, 2019: Live Concert: Truyện ngắn at Vietnam National Convention Center, Hanoi.
