= Izak =

Izak (or Izaak, also Isak, Izhak, Itzchak, Itzik, etc.) is a given name which is an alternate spelling for Isaac.

Notable people and characters with the name include:

== Izak ==
- Izak, Polish esports player
- Izak Akakpo (born 2004), Togolese footballer
- Izak Aloni (1905–1985), Israeli chess master
- Izak Buys (1895–1946), South African cricketer
- Izak Davel (born 1943), South African actor
- Izak David du Plessis (1900–1981), South African Afrikaans writer
- Izak Moerdijk (born 1958), Dutch mathematician
- Izak Reid (born 1987), English sportsman
- Izak Rober (1930–2000), Turkish sportsman
- Izak Šantej (born 1973), Slovenian motorcyclist
- Izak van der Merwe (born 1984), South African tennis player
- Izak Van Heerden (1910–1973), South African rugby coach

Surname

- Vian Izak, South African American singer-songwriter

== Izaak ==
- Izaak Appel (1905–1941), Polish chess master
- Izaak Grunbaum (1879–1970), Israeli politician
- Izaak Grynfeld (1912–?), Israeli chess master
- Izaak Walton Killam (1885–1955), Canadian financier
- Izaak Kolthoff (1894–1993), Dutch chemist
- Izaak H. Reijnders (1879–1966), Dutch military commander
- Izaak Towbin (1899–1941), Polish chess master
- Izaak Walton (1593–1683), English writer

== Izaac ==
- Izaac Pacheco (born 2002), American baseball player
- Izaac Johanes Wanggai (born 1982), Indonesian sportsman
- Izaac Wang (born 2007), American child actor
- Izaac Williams (born 1989), New Zealand sportsman

== Isak ==
- Isak Andersson (born 1996), Swedish hurdler
- Isak Andic (1953–2024), Turkish-born Spanish businessman
- Isak-Beg (died 1457), Ottoman governor and soldier
- Isak Gustaf Clason (1856–1930), Swedish architect
- Isak Dinesen (1885–1962), pen name of Karen Blixen, Danish author
- Isak From (born 1967), Swedish politician
- Isak Hien (born 1999), Swedish footballer
- Per Isak Juuso (born 1953), Swedish-Sámi artisan and teacher
- Isak Musliu (born 1970), Yugoslavian camp guard
- Isak Penttala (1883–1955), Finnish politician
- Isak Saba (1875–1921), Norwegian leader
- Isak Valtersen, fictional character in the Norwegian TV show Skam

Surname

- Abdi Isak (born 1966), Somali marathon runner
- Alexander Isak (born 1999), Swedish footballer
- Joesoef Isak (1928–2009), Indonesian publisher, translator and left-wing intellectual
- Kim Isak (born 1985), German-American singer, actress and radio personality

== Itzhak ==
- Itzhak Perlman (born 1945), Israeli-American musician
- Itzhak Rabin (1922–1995), Israeli leader
- Itzhak Shum (born 1948), Israeli sportsman
- Itzhak Ben-Zvi (1884–1963), Israeli president
- Itzhak Katzenelson (1886–1944), Jewish intellectual
- Itzhak Shamir (1915–2012), Israeli politician
- Itzhak Fintzi (born 1933), Bulgarian actor
- Itzhak Stern (1901–1969), Polish Holocaust survivor
- Itzhak Bentov (1923–1979), Czech intellectual
- Itzhak Sadeh (1890–1952), Israeli leader

Surname

- Gil Itzhak (born 1993), Israeli footballer
- Gonen Ben Itzhak (born 1971), Israeli lawyer
- Itzik Ben-Itzhak (born 1952), American professor of physics
- Liora Itzhak (born 1974), Israeli singer
- Ran Itzhak (born 1987), Israeli footballer
- Yuval Ben-Itzhak, Israeli executive and entrepreneur

== Itzchak ==
- Itzchak Tarkay (1935–2012), Israeli painter

== Itzik ==
- Itzik Zohar (born 1970), Israeli sportsman
- Itzik Manger (1901–1969), Yiddish intellectual
- Itzik Feffer (1900–1952), Soviet intellectual
- Itzik Kol (1932–2007), Israeli TV producer
- Itzik Kornfein (born 1971), Israeli sportsman

Surname

- Dalia Itzik (born 1952), Israeli politician

== Izhak ==
- Izhak Mamistvalov (born 1979), Israeli swimmer
- Izhak Graziani (1924–2003), Israeli conductor

== Izsak ==
- Izsák Lőwy (1793–1847), Hungarian industrialist
- Imre Izsák (1929–1965), Hungarian scientist
- Carolina Izsak (born 1971), Venezuelan beauty queen
- Meir ben Izsak Eisenstadt (1670–1744), Jewish rabbi

Surname

- Éva Izsák (born 1967), Hungarian road cyclist
- Imre Izsák (1929–1965), Hungarian mathematician, physicist, and astronomer
- Ladislav Izsák (born 1954), Hungarian footballer
- Márton Izsák, Hungarian sculptor
- Szabolcs Izsák (1944–1993), Hungarian sailor

== Other variants ==
- Isakas Vistaneckis (1910–2000), Lithuanian chess master
- Isaka Cernak (born 1989), Australian sportsman

== See also ==
- Isaac (disambiguation)
- Isaacs (disambiguation)
- Ishak (disambiguation)
- Zack (disambiguation)
- Izzy (disambiguation)
- Izak catsharks
