= List of Israeli football transfers winter 2024–25 =

This is a list of Israeli football transfers for the winter 2024–25 Transfer Window.

== Ligat Ha'Al ==
=== Beitar Jerusalem ===
In:

No.	Pos.	Nation	Player
—	FW	(Israel) ISR	Omer Atzili (from (Cyprus) Omonia)

Out:

No.	Pos.	Nation	Player
—	DF	(Israel) ISR	Raz Baruchian (on loan to F.C. Jerusalem)
—	MF	(Israel) ISR	Ofir Kriaf (to F.C. Ashdod)
—	MF	(Israel) ISR	Nadav Markovich (on loan to Hapoel Kfar Saba)

=== Bnei Sakhnin ===
In:

No.	Pos.	Nation	Player
—	DF	(Israel) ISR	Hatem Abd Elhamed (from Ironi Tiberias)
—	MF	(Israel) ISR	Elad Shahaf (from F.C. Ashdod)
—	FW	(Ghana) GHA	Barnes Osei (from (Kazakhstan) FC Astana)
—	FW	(Republic of the Congo) CGO	Mavis Tchibota (from (Russia) Akron Toylatti)
—	FW	(Cameroon) CMR	Kévin Soni (Free transfer)

Out:

No.	Pos.	Nation	Player
—	DF	(Cyprus) CYP	Constantinos Soteriou (to (Poland) Korona Kielce)
—	MF	(Israel) ISR	Matanel Tadesa (to Ironi Tiberias)
—	MF	(Belgium) BEL	Stephane Omeonga (to (Greece) Panserraikos)
—	FW	(Georgia (country)) GEO	Paata Gudushauri (Free agent)
—	FW	(Cameroon) CMR	Kévin Soni (to (Bosnia and Herzegovina) Železničar Pančevo)
—	FW	(Israel) ISR	Anis Porat Ayash (to Hapoel Haifa, his player card still belongs to Maccabi Tel Aviv)

=== F.C. Ashdod ===
In:

No.	Pos.	Nation	Player
—	GK	(Poland) POL	Karol Niemczycki (from (Germany) SV Darmstadt 98)
—	DF	(Israel) ISR	Nir Bitton (from Maccabi Tel Aviv)
—	MF	(Israel) ISR	Ofir Kriaf (from Beitar Jerusalem)
—	FW	(Argentina) ARG	Israel Coll (from (Cyprus) Apollon Limassol)
—	FW	(Israel) ISR	Ori Azo (on loan from Maccabi Tel Aviv)
—	FW	(Israel) ISR	Idan Dahan (from Hapoel Jerusalem)

Out:

No.	Pos.	Nation	Player
—	DF	(Ghana) GHA	Montari Kamaheni (to Hapoel Kfar Shalem)
—	DF	(Dominican Republic) DOM	Luiyi de Lucas (to (Cyprus) Nea Salamis Famagusta)
—	MF	(Israel) ISR	Elad Shahaf (to Bnei Sakhnin)
—	MF	(Israel) ISR	Omer Ifrah (on loan to Hapoel Ramat HaSharon)
—	MF	(Ghana) GHA	Emmanuel Agyei (on loan to Hapoel Ramat Gan)
—	FW	(Israel) ISR	Asil Kna'ani (to Hapoel Nof HaGalil)

=== Hapoel Be'er Sheva ===
In:

No.	Pos.	Nation	Player
—	DF	(Cape Verde) CPV	Carlos Ponck (from (Portugal) Moreirense)
—	MF	(Portugal) POR	Iuri Medeiros (Free transfer)

Out:

No.	Pos.	Nation	Player
—	DF	(Israel) ISR	Or Dadia (on loan to Ironi Kiryat Shmona)
—	MF	(Israel) ISR	Mariano Bareiro (Free transfer)
—	MF	(Israel) ISR	Tomer Yosefi (to (Ukraine) Polissya Zhytomyr)
—	MF	(Romania) ROU	Antonio Sefer (on loan to (Poland) Motor Lublin)
—	FW	(Israel) ISR	Guy Badash (on loan to Hapoel Jerusalem)
—	FW	(Israel) ISR	Rotem Hatuel (on loan to Hapoel Tel Aviv)
—	FW	(Israel) ISR	Eylon Almog (on loan to Hapoel Jerusalem)

=== Hapoel Hadera ===
In:

No.	Pos.	Nation	Player
—	DF	(Israel) ISR	Tomer Levi (Free transfer)
—	DF	(Israel) ISR	Nir Bardea (Free transfer)
—	MF	(Israel) ISR	Dan Azaria (Free transfer)
—	MF	(Israel) ISR	Dan Einbinder (Free transfer)
—	MF	(Israel) ISR	Gilad Avramov (Free transfer)
—	MF	(Georgia (country)) GEO	Levan Osikmashvili (on loan from (Georgia (country)) Dinamo Tbilisi)
—	FW	(Colombia) COL	José Cortés (from (Peru) Carlos A. Mannucci)
—	FW	(Israel) ISR	Osher Eliyahu (on loan from Maccabi Netanya)

Out:

No.	Pos.	Nation	Player
—	DF	(Guinea) GUI	Abdoulaye Cissé (to (Serbia) Novi Pazar)
—	DF	(Israel) ISR	Harel Shalom (to Maccabi Netanya)
—	DF	(Israel) ISR	Tomer Levi (to Hapoel Ramat Gan)
—	DF	(Israel) ISR	Reef Amsalem (to Hapoel Ramat HaSharon)
—	MF	(Israel) ISR	Yadin Lugasi (to Hapoel Afula)
—	MF	(Israel) ISR	Ilay Trost (to Bnei Yehuda)
—	MF	(Israel) ISR	Tamir Adi (to Hapoel Kfar Shalem)
—	FW	(Israel) ISR	Raz Twizer (to Hapoel Acre)
—	FW	(Ivory Coast) CIV	Duvan Diby (on loan to Hapoel Ramat HaSharon)
—	FW	(Israel) ISR	Osher Eliyahu (on loan to Hapoel Hadera)

=== Hapoel Haifa ===
In:

No.	Pos.	Nation	Player
—	MF	(Israel) ISR	Aviel Zargari (on loan from Maccabi Haifa)
—	FW	(Ivory Coast) CIV	Aboubacar Doumbia (on loan from (Cyprus) Karmiotissa FC)
—	FW	(Jamaica) JAM	Javon East (from (Costa Rica) Saprissa)
—	FW	(Israel) ISR	Anis Porat Ayash (on loan from Maccabi Tel Aviv)

Out:

No.	Pos.	Nation	Player
—	FW	(Israel) ISR	Guy Melamed (to Maccabi Haifa)

=== Hapoel Jerusalem ===
In:

No.	Pos.	Nation	Player
—	FW	(Israel) ISR	Guy Badash (on loan from Hapoel Be'er Sheva)
—	FW	(Israel) ISR	Eylon Almog (on loan from Hapoel Be'er Sheva)

Out:

No.	Pos.	Nation	Player
—	DF	(Israel) ISR	Shahar Piven (to Hapoel Tel Aviv)
—	MF	(Israel) ISR	Ofek Bitton (to (Ukraine) Polissya Zhytomyr)
—	FW	(Netherlands) NED	Jelle Duin (to (Denmark) Vejle)
—	FW	(Israel) ISR	Idan Dahan (to F.C. Ashdod)

=== Ironi Kiryat Shmona ===
In:

No.	Pos.	Nation	Player
—	DF	(Israel) ISR	Or Dadia (on loan from Hapoel Be'er Sheva)
—	FW	(Cameroon) CMR	Christian Bella (from (Lithuania) Džiugas Telšiai)

Out:

No.	Pos.	Nation	Player
—	DF	(Israel) ISR	Salah Hussein (to Hapoel Nof HaGalil)
—	DF	(Israel) ISR	Shon Edri (to Hapoel Petah Tikva, his player card still belongs to Maccabi Tel Aviv)
—	FW	(Israel) ISR	Hamza Shibli (to Maccabi Bnei Reineh, his player card still belongs to Maccabi Haifa)
—	FW	(Israel) ISR	David Dego (to Hapoel Petah Tikva)

=== Ironi Tiberias ===
In:

No.	Pos.	Nation	Player
—	DF	(Israel) ISR	Aviv Solomon (Free transfer)
—	MF	(Israel) ISR	Michael Ohana (Free transfer)
—	MF	(Israel) ISR	Matanel Tadesa (from Bnei Sakhnin)
—	MF	(Israel) ISR	David Keltjens (from (Scotland) St Johnstone)
—	FW	(Nigeria) NGA	Peter Michael (on loan from (Romania) CFR Cluj)

Out:

No.	Pos.	Nation	Player
—	DF	(Israel) ISR	Hatem Abd Elhamed (to Bnei Sakhnin)
—	MF	(Argentina) ARG	Franco Mazurek (to (Chile) Deportes Copiapó)
—	MF	(Israel) ISR	Yaniv Brik (to Bnei Yehuda)
—	FW	(The Gambia) GAM	Mansour Badjie (on loan to Maccabi Jaffa)
—	FW	(Israel) ISR	Nawaf Bazea (to F.C. Kafr Qasim)

=== Maccabi Bnei Reineh ===
In:

No.	Pos.	Nation	Player
—	MF	(Israel) ISR	Omri Altman (from (Greece) Volos)
—	FW	(Israel) ISR	Hamza Shibli (on loan from Maccabi Haifa)

Out:

No.	Pos.	Nation	Player
—	FW	(Israel) ISR	Meir Buhbut (on loan to Hapoel Bu'eine)

=== Maccabi Haifa ===
In:

No.	Pos.	Nation	Player
—	FW	(Brazil) BRA	Ricardinho (on loan from (Czech Republic) Viktoria Plzeň)
—	FW	(Israel) ISR	Guy Melamed (from Hapoel Haifa)

Out:

No.	Pos.	Nation	Player
—	DF	(Israel) ISR	Ilay Feingold (to (United States) New England Revolution)
—	MF	(Israel) ISR	Aviel Zargari (on loan to Hapoel Haifa)

=== Maccabi Netanya ===
In:

No.	Pos.	Nation	Player
—	DF	(Israel) ISR	Harel Shalom (from Hapoel Hadera)
—	DF	(Israel) ISR	Amit Cohen (from Bnei Yehuda)

Out:

No.	Pos.	Nation	Player
—	DF	(Israel) ISR	Joel Abu Hanna (to (Greece) Levadiakos)
—	FW	(Israel) ISR	Itamar Shviro (to Hapoel Tel Aviv)
—	FW	(Israel) ISR	Idan Baranes (on loan to Hapoel Acre)

=== Maccabi Petah Tikva ===
In:

No.	Pos.	Nation	Player
—	MF	(Israel) ISR	Arad Bar (on loan from (Ukraine) LNZ Cherkasy)
—	FW	(Israel) ISR	Wilson Harris (from (United States) Louisville City)
—	FW	(Belgium) BEL	Jordy Soladio (from (Belgium) Dender)

Out:

No.	Pos.	Nation	Player
—	DF	(Bosnia and Herzegovina) BIH	Renato Gojković (to (Bosnia and Herzegovina) FK Sarajevo)
—	MF	(Israel) ISR	Itay Shalev (on loan to Hapoel Nof HaGalil)
—	MF	(Israel) ISR	Harel Shasha (on loan to Maccabi Jaffa)
—	MF	(Israel) ISR	Itamar Masharki (on loan to F.C. Kafr Qasim)
—	FW	(Colombia) COL	Deinner Quiñones (Free agent)
—	FW	(Slovenia) SVN	Luka Štor (to (Spain) CF Intercity)

=== Maccabi Tel Aviv ===
In:

No.	Pos.	Nation	Player
—	GK	(Croatia) CRO	Simon Sluga (Free transfer)

Out:

No.	Pos.	Nation	Player
—	DF	(Israel) ISR	Nir Bitton (to F.C. Ashdod)
—	MF	(Israel) ISR	Ido Ouli (on loan to Hapoel Ramat HaSharon)
—	FW	(Israel) ISR	Agam Hanoun (on loan to Hapoel Ramat HaSharon)

== Liga Leumit ==
=== Bnei Yehuda ===
In:

No.	Pos.	Nation	Player
—	DF	(Russia) RUS	Nikolai Tarasov (Free transfer)
—	MF	(Nigeria) NGA	Olawale Onanuga (Free transfer)
—	MF	(Israel) ISR	Yaniv Brik (from Ironi Tiberias)
—	MF	(Israel) ISR	Ilay Trost (from Hapoel Hadera)
—	FW	(Georgia (country)) GEO	Giorgi Lomtadze (on loan from (Georgia (country)) Gagra)
—	FW	(Democratic Republic of the Congo) COD	Christy Manzinga (from (South Korea) Seongnam FC)
—	FW	(Belgium) BEL	Ziguy Badibanga (Free transfer)
—	FW	(Israel) ISR	Julian Shelufe (from Hapoel Nof HaGalil)

Out:

No.	Pos.	Nation	Player
—	DF	(Israel) ISR	Dolev Azruel (to Hapoel Afula)
—	DF	(Israel) ISR	Yakov Ababa (to Hapoel Kfar Shalem)
—	DF	(Israel) ISR	Amit Cohen (to Maccabi Netanya)
—	MF	(Albania) ALB	Erisildo Smaci (Free agent)
—	MF	(Israel) ISR	Moti Barshazki (to Hapoel Ramat Gan)
—	MF	(Belgium) BEL	Ziguy Badibanga (to Hapoel Afula)
—	MF	(Israel) ISR	Samuel Broun (to Hapoel Rishon LeZion)
—	MF	(Israel) ISR	Liad Vaknin (to Hapoel Kfar Shalem)
—	FW	(Israel) ISR	Shavit Mazal (to Hapoel Ramat Gan)

=== F.C. Kafr Qasim ===
In:

No.	Pos.	Nation	Player
—	MF	(France) FRA	Romain Habran (from Hapoel Acre)
—	MF	(Israel) ISR	Itamar Masharki (on loan from Maccabi Petah Tikva)
—	FW	(Israel) ISR	Nawaf Bazea (from Ironi Tiberias)

Out:

No.	Pos.	Nation	Player
—	MF	(Israel) ISR	Shay Golan (to F.C. Holon Yermiyahu)
—	FW	(Israel) ISR	Moamen Iraqi (to F.C. Tira)
—	FW	(Israel) ISR	Abd al-Salam Hamouda (on loan to Hapoel Bu'eine)

=== Hapoel Acre ===
In:

No.	Pos.	Nation	Player
—	GK	(Israel) ISR	Poraz Volkovich (from Hapoel Ashdod)
—	DF	(Israel) ISR	Muflah Shalata (Free transfer)
—	DF	(Benin) BEN	Charlemagne Azongnitode (from Hapoel Petah Tikva)
—	FW	(Israel) ISR	Idan Golan (Free transfer)
—	FW	(Brazil) BRA	Marco Túlio (Free transfer)
—	FW	(Democratic Republic of the Congo) COD	Kule Mbombo (from Hapoel Afula)
—	FW	(Israel) ISR	Raz Twizer (from Hapoel Hadera)

Out:

No.	Pos.	Nation	Player
—	DF	(Israel) ISR	Shalev Ben Muha (to Ironi Nesher)
—	MF	(France) FRA	Romain Habran (to F.C. Kafr Qasim)
—	MF	(Israel) ISR	Iham Shehade (to Hapoel Nof HaGalil)
—	MF	(Ivory Coast) CIV	Claude Kouakou (to (Austria) Wolfsberger AC)
—	FW	(Israel) ISR	Idan Golan (to Hapoel Umm al-Fahm)
—	FW	(Israel) ISR	Eden Ben Simon (to Hapoel Umm al-Fahm)
—	FW	(Israel) ISR	Amit Zenati (to Maccabi Herzliya)

=== Hapoel Afula ===
In:

No.	Pos.	Nation	Player
—	DF	(Israel) ISR	Yazan Nassar (Free transfer)
—	DF	(Israel) ISR	Dolev Azruel (from Bnei Yehuda)
—	MF	(Israel) ISR	Ismaeel Ryan (Free transfer)
—	MF	(Israel) ISR	Nir Hasson (Free transfer)
—	MF	(Israel) ISR	Yadin Lugasi (from Hapoel Hadera)
—	MF	(Belgium) BEL	Ziguy Badibanga (from Bnei Yehuda)
—	FW	(Israel) ISR	Ben Azubel (from Hapoel Acre)

Out:

No.	Pos.	Nation	Player
—	GK	(Israel) ISR	Amit Suiri (to Maccabi Ata Bialik)
—	DF	(Colombia) COL	Gustavo Chará (Free agent)
—	MF	(Israel) ISR	Ilay Azar (to Hapoel Beit She'an)
—	MF	(Israel) ISR	Ismaeel Ryan (to Hapoel Ra'anana)
—	FW	(Democratic Republic of the Congo) COD	Kule Mbombo (to Hapoel Acre)

=== Hapoel Kfar Saba ===
In:

No.	Pos.	Nation	Player
—	DF	(Israel) ISR	Tal Archel (on loan from Hapoel Tel Aviv)
—	DF	(Israel) ISR	Yuval Ben Ami (from Hapoel Kfar Shalem)
—	MF	(Israel) ISR	Nadav Markovich (on loan from Beitar Jerusalem)

Out:

No.	Pos.	Nation	Player
—	MF	(Brazil) BRA	Léo Índio (to (Brazil) Ponte Preta)

=== Hapoel Kfar Shalem ===
In:

No.	Pos.	Nation	Player
—	DF	(Ghana) GHA	Montari Kamaheni (from F.C. Ashdod)
—	DF	(Israel) ISR	Yakov Ababa (from Bnei Yehuda)
—	DF	(Israel) ISR	Shahaf Tzafrir (from Hapoel Umm al-Fahm)
—	MF	(Israel) ISR	Tamir Adi (from Hapoel Hadera)
—	MF	(Israel) ISR	Liad Vaknin (from Bnei Yehuda)
—	FW	(Israel) ISR	Raz Stain (from Hapoel Rishon LeZion)

Out:

No.	Pos.	Nation	Player
—	DF	(Israel) ISR	Manamto Asefa (to Hapoel Ashdod)
—	DF	(Israel) ISR	Yuval Ben Ami (to Hapoel Kfar Saba)
—	DF	(Israel) ISR	Niv Vahaba (to F.C. Yermiyahu Holon)
—	MF	(Israel) ISR	Din Soffer (to Maccabi Kiyat Malakhi)
—	MF	(Israel) ISR	Eden Otachi (to Hapoel Ramat HaSharon)
—	FW	(Israel) ISR	Nasser Issa (to Hapoel Umm al-Fahm)

=== Hapoel Nof HaGalil ===
In:

No.	Pos.	Nation	Player
—	GK	(Israel) ISR	Matan Ambar (from Hapoel Ramat HaSharon)
—	DF	(Israel) ISR	Salah Hussein (from Ironi Kiryat Shmona)
—	DF	(Israel) ISR	Tal Sarig (from F.C. Yermiyahu Holon)
—	DF	(Mali) MLI	Hamidou Diallo (Free transfer)
—	DF	(Israel) ISR	Najwan Khatib (from Hapoel Ramat HaSharon)
—	MF	(Israel) ISR	Eyas Masalha (Free transfer)
—	MF	(Israel) ISR	Iham Shehade (from Hapoel Acre)
—	MF	(Israel) ISR	Itay Shalev (on loan from Maccabi Petah Tikva)
—	FW	(Israel) ISR	Asil Kna'ani (from F.C. Ashdod)
—	FW	(Israel) ISR	Liad Ramot (on loan from Hapoel Tel Aviv)

Out:

No.	Pos.	Nation	Player
—	GK	(Israel) ISR	Gil Barda (to Hapoel Umm al-Fahm)
—	DF	(Ivory Coast) CIV	Abdoul Kudus Coulibaly (to Hapoel Umm al-Fahm, his player card still belongs to Hapoel Be'er Sheva)
—	MF	(Israel) ISR	Mohammed Abu Ras (on loan to Maccabi Umm al-Fahm)
—	MF	(Israel) ISR	Dor Kochav (to Hapoel Ra'anana)
—	MF	(Israel) ISR	Amit Mualem (to Maccabi Ata Bialik)
—	FW	(Israel) ISR	Guy Dahan (to (Moldova) Zimbru Chișinău)
—	FW	(Israel) ISR	Julian Shelufe (to Bnei Yehuda)

=== Hapoel Petah Tikva ===
In:

No.	Pos.	Nation	Player
—	DF	(Israel) ISR	Shon Edri (from Ironi Kiryat Shmona, his player card still belongs to Maccabi Tel Aviv)
—	DF	(Israel) ISR	Idan Cohen (from Hapoel Ramat HaSharon)
—	FW	(Israel) ISR	Ben Azubel (from Hapoel Afula)
—	FW	(France) FRA	Franck Rivollier (from (Bulgaria) Spartak Varna)
—	FW	(Israel) ISR	Yuval Sasson (on loan from Hapoel Rishon LeZion)
—	FW	(Israel) ISR	David Dego (from Ironi Kiryat Shmona)

Out:

No.	Pos.	Nation	Player
—	DF	(Benin) BEN	Charlemagne Azongnitode (to Hapoel Acre)
—	MF	(Israel) ISR	Shay Sabah (to F.C. Dimona)
—	FW	(Israel) ISR	Amir Berkovits (to Hapoel Rishon LeZion)

=== Hapoel Ramat Gan ===
In:

No.	Pos.	Nation	Player
—	DF	(Israel) ISR	Tomer Levi (from Hapoel Hadera)
—	MF	(Israel) ISR	Moti Barshazki (from Bnei Yehuda)
—	MF	(Ghana) GHA	Emmanuel Agyei (on loan from F.C. Ashdod)
—	FW	(Israel) ISR	Shavit Mazal (from Bnei Yehuda)

Out:

No.	Pos.	Nation	Player
—	DF	(Israel) ISR	Assaf Simantov (on loan to Shimshon Tel Aviv)
—	FW	(Israel) ISR	Meir Cohen (to Sektzia Ness Ziona)

=== Hapoel Ramat HaSharon ===
In:

No.	Pos.	Nation	Player
—	DF	(Israel) ISR	Reef Amsalem (from Hapoel Hadera)
—	DF	(Israel) ISR	Ben Itzhak (from Beitar Nordia Jerusalem)
—	MF	(Israel) ISR	Ido Ouli (on loan from Maccabi Tel Aviv)
—	MF	(Israel) ISR	Omer Ifrah (on loan from F.C. Ashdod)
—	MF	(Israel) ISR	Dor Osowsky (from Hapoel Rishon LeZion)
—	MF	(Israel) ISR	Eden Otachi (from Hapoel Kfar Shalem)
—	FW	(Israel) ISR	Agam Hanoun (on loan from Maccabi Tel Aviv)
—	FW	(Ivory Coast) CIV	Duvan Diby (on loan from Hapoel Hadera)
—	FW	(Nigeria) NGA	Chinemerem Godwin (from Hapoel Umm al-Fahm)

Out:

No.	Pos.	Nation	Player
—	GK	(Israel) ISR	Matan Ambar (to Hapoel Nof HaGalil)
—	DF	(Israel) ISR	David Tiram (to Maccabi Jaffa)
—	DF	(Israel) ISR	Najwan Khatib (to Hapoel Nof HaGalil)
—	DF	(Israel) ISR	Idan Cohen (to Hapoel Petah Tikva)
—	FW	(Israel) ISR	Dovev Gabay (to Maccabi Jaffa)
—	FW	(Israel) ISR	Ori Azo (to F.C. Ashdod, his player card still belongs to Maccabi Tel Aviv)

=== Hapoel Rishon LeZion ===
In:

No.	Pos.	Nation	Player
—	DF	(Israel) ISR	Osher Abu (from Hapoel Ra'anana)
—	MF	(Israel) ISR	Dan Kaduri (from Hapoel Umm al-Fahm)
—	MF	(Israel) ISR	Samuel Broun (from Bnei Yehuda)
—	FW	(Nigeria) NGA	Innocent Kingsley (from (Nigeria) Katsina United)
—	FW	(Israel) ISR	Amir Berkovits (from Hapoel Petah Tikva)

Out:

No.	Pos.	Nation	Player
—	GK	(Israel) ISR	Eliran Gomelski (on loan to Maccabi Herzliya)
—	MF	(Israel) ISR	Dor Osowsky (to Hapoel Ramat HaSharon)
—	FW	(Israel) ISR	Raz Stain (to Hapoel Kfar Shalem)
—	FW	(Israel) ISR	Yuval Sasson (on loan to Hapoel Petah Tikva)

=== Hapoel Tel Aviv ===
In:

No.	Pos.	Nation	Player
—	DF	(Israel) ISR	Shahar Piven (from Hapoel Jerusalem)
—	MF	(Portugal) POR	Henrique Jocú (from (Portugal) Feirense)
—	FW	(Israel) ISR	Ya'akov Berihon (Free transfer)
—	FW	(Israel) ISR	Rotem Hatuel (on loan from Hapoel Be'er Sheva)
—	FW	(Israel) ISR	Itamar Shviro (from Maccabi Netanya)

Out:

No.	Pos.	Nation	Player
—	DF	(Israel) ISR	Tal Archel (on loan to Hapoel Kfar Saba)
—	FW	(Israel) ISR	Sagi Genis (on loan to Hapoel Ra'anana)

=== Hapoel Umm al-Fahm ===
In:

No.	Pos.	Nation	Player
—	GK	(Israel) ISR	David Ben Lulu (from Maccabi Ata Bialik)
—	GK	(Israel) ISR	Gil Barda (from Hapoel Nof HaGalil)
—	DF	(Israel) ISR	Niran Rotstein (Free transfer)
—	DF	(Ivory Coast) CIV	Abdoul Kudus Coulibaly (on loan from Hapoel Be'er Sheva)
—	MF	(Israel) ISR	Dan Kaduri (Free transfer)
—	MF	(Israel) ISR	Liel Cohen (from Hapoel Baqa al-Gharbiyye)
—	MF	(Israel) ISR	Ilay Segev (from F.C. Tzeirei Kafr Kanna)
—	FW	(Israel) ISR	Roy Buganim (Free transfer)
—	FW	(Israel) ISR	Idan Golan (from Hapoel Acre)
—	FW	(Israel) ISR	Eden Ben Simon (from Hapoel Acre)
—	FW	(Israel) ISR	Nasser Issa (from Hapoel Kfar Shalem)
—	FW	(Israel) ISR	Karem Arshid (from F.C. Tirat Carmel)

Out:

No.	Pos.	Nation	Player
—	GK	(Palestine) PLE	Mahdi Zoabi (to F.C. Tira)
—	DF	(Russia) RUS	Nikita Khodorchenko (Free agent)
—	DF	(Israel) ISR	Shahaf Tzafrir (to Hapoel Kfar Shalem)
—	MF	(Israel) ISR	Amir Agayev (to F.C. Dimona)
—	MF	(Israel) ISR	Liel Cohen (to F.C. Kiryat Yam)
—	MF	(Israel) ISR	Dan Kaduri (to Hapoel Rishon LeZion)
—	FW	(Israel) ISR	Imran Agbaria (to Tzeirei Umm al-Fahm)
—	FW	(Israel) ISR	Abdallah Jabarin (to Tzeirei Umm al-Fahm)
—	FW	(Nigeria) NGA	Chinemerem Godwin (to Hapoel Ramat HaSharon)

=== Hapoel Ra'anana ===
In:

No.	Pos.	Nation	Player
—	MF	(Israel) ISR	Sean Buskila (Free transfer)
—	MF	(Israel) ISR	Awajo Asefa (Free transfer)
—	MF	(Israel) ISR	Ismaeel Ryan (from Hapoel Afula)
—	MF	(Israel) ISR	Dor Kochav (from Hapoel Nof HaGalil)
—	FW	(Israel) ISR	Sagi Genis (on loan from Hapoel Tel Aviv)

Out:

No.	Pos.	Nation	Player
—	DF	(Israel) ISR	Osher Abu (to Hapoel Rishon LeZion)

=== Maccabi Herzliya ===
In:

No.	Pos.	Nation	Player
—	GK	(Israel) ISR	Eliran Gomelski (on loan from Hapoel Rishon LeZion)
—	MF	(Israel) ISR	Or Ostvind (Free transfer)
—	MF	(Israel) ISR	Eylon Yerushalmi (from Maccabi Jaffa)

Out:

No.	Pos.	Nation	Player
—	MF	(Benin) BEN	Bienvenu Vigninou (Free agent)
—	FW	(Israel) ISR	Harel Ben Avi (on loan to Ironi Modi'in)

=== Maccabi Jaffa ===
In:

No.	Pos.	Nation	Player
—	DF	(Israel) ISR	Ilay Tomer (Free transfer)
—	DF	(Israel) ISR	Or Zahavi (Free transfer)
—	DF	(Israel) ISR	David Tiram (from Hapoel Ramat HaSharon)
—	MF	(Ghana) GHA	Isaac Nortey (from (Cyprus) Enosis Neon Paralimni)
—	MF	(Israel) ISR	Harel Shasha (on loan from Maccabi Petah Tikva)
—	MF	(Israel) ISR	Assaf Hershko (Free transfer)
—	FW	(The Gambia) GAM	Mansour Badjie (on loan from Ironi Tiberias)
—	FW	(Israel) ISR	Dovev Gabay (from Hapoel Ramat HaSharon)

Out:

No.	Pos.	Nation	Player
—	DF	(Nigeria) NGA	Adeleke Adekunle (Free agent)
—	MF	(Israel) ISR	Yasmao Cabeda (Free agent)
—	MF	(Israel) ISR	Eylon Yerushalmi (to Maccabi Herzliya)
—	FW	(Israel) ISR	Liad Ramot (to Hapoel Nof HaGalil, his playet card still belongs to Hapoel Tel Aviv)
