= Isakov =

Isakov (Russian: Исаков) is a Slavic-language patronymic surname, a derivative from "Isaac". It may refer to the following people:

- Dimitar Isakov (born 1924), Bulgarian football player
- Eduard Isakov (born 1973), Russian politician
- Evgeny Isakov (born 1984), Russian ice hockey player
- Gregory Alan Isakov (born 1979), South African-American singer-songwriter
- Ismail Isakov (born 1950), Kyrgyzstan politician and Lieutenant General in the Kyrgyz military
- Ivan Isakov (1894–1967), Soviet Armenian Admiral of the Fleet
- Mile Isakov (born 1950), Serbian politician and journalist
- Pyotr Isakov (1900–1957), Soviet football player and manager
- Victor Isakov (1947–2021), American mathematician
- Vladimir Isakov (disambiguation), multiple people
- Yuri Isakov (1912–1988), Soviet ornithologist and biogeographer
- Yury Isakov (1949–2013), Soviet pole vaulter

== See also ==
- Isaacs
- Isaak
