= Isaacs =

Isaacs may refer to:

- The Isaacs, a bluegrass Southern gospel music group
- Isaacs (surname)
- Isaacs, Australian Capital Territory, a suburb of Canberra, Australia
- Isaacs on the Quay, a pub in Ipswich, Suffolk, England
- Division of Isaacs, a federal electoral division in Victoria, Australia
- Division of Isaacs (1949–1969), a former Australian Electoral Division

== See also ==
- Isaacs Creek (disambiguation)
- Isaac (disambiguation)
- Ishak (disambiguation)
- Izak (disambiguation)
- Zack (disambiguation)
- Izzy (disambiguation)
