= Isaacman =

Isaacman is a surname. Notable people with the surname include:

- Alan Isaacman (born 1942), U.S. lawyer
- Allen Isaacman, U.S. historian
- Jared Isaacman, U.S. businessman and NASA administrator
- Sonia Bunting (1922–2001, born Sonia Beryl Isaacman), South African journalist and anti-apartheid activist
- Zachary R. Isaacman, a 2010 school shooter, see List of school shootings in the United States

== See also ==
- Isaacs (surname)
- Isaacson
- Isaac (disambiguation)
- Man (disambiguation)
