= Software monetization =

Strategy employed by software companies and device vendors

Software monetization is a strategy employed by software companies and device vendors to maximize the profitability of their software. The software licensing component of this strategy enables software companies and device vendors to simultaneously protect their applications and embedded software from unauthorized copying, distribution, and use, and capture new revenue streams through creative pricing and packaging models. Whether a software application is hosted in the cloud, embedded in hardware, or installed on premises, software monetization solutions can help businesses extract the most value from their software. Another way to achieve software monetization is through paid advertising and the various compensation methods available to software publishers. Pay-per-install (PPI), for example, generates revenue by bundling third-party applications, also known as adware, with either freeware or shareware applications.

== History ==
The exact origin of the term 'software monetization' is unknown, however, it has been in use in the information security industry since 2010. It was first used to articulate the value of licensing for cloud-hosted applications, but later came to encompass applications embedded in hardware and installed on premises. Today, software monetization broadly applies to software licensing, protection, and entitlement management solutions. In the digital advertising space, the term refers to solutions that increase revenue through installs, traffic, display ads, and search.

== Key areas of software monetization ==
=== IP protection ===
Software constitutes a significant part of a software company or device vendor's intellectual property (IP) and, as such, may benefit from strong security, encryption, and digital rights management (DRM). Depending on a company's particular use case, they can choose to implement a hardware, software, or cloud-based licensing solution, or by open sourcing software and relying on donations and/or compensation for support, customization or enhancements.

A hardware-based protection key, or dongle, is best suited to software publishers concerned about the security of their product as it offers the highest level of copy protection and IP protection. Although a key must be physically connected in order to access or run an application, end users are not required to install any device drivers on their machines. A software-based protection key is ideal for software publishers who require flexible license delivery. The virtual nature of software keys eliminates the need to ship a physical product, thus enabling end users to quickly install and use an application with minimal fuss. Cloud-based licensing, on the other hand, provides automatic and immediate license enablement, so users can access software from any device including virtual machines and mobile devices.

It is in the best interests of software companies and device vendors to take the necessary measures to protect their code from software piracy, a problem that costs the global software industry more than $100 billion annually. However, software protection is not just about preventing revenue loss; it is also about an organization's ability to protect the integrity of its product or service and brand reputation.

=== Pricing and packaging ===
An independent report by Vanson Bourne found that software vendors are losing revenue due to rigid licensing and delivery options. Since the demands of enterprise and end users are constantly evolving, software companies and device vendors must be able to adapt their pricing and packaging strategies on the fly. Separating an application's features and selling them individually at a premium is a highly effective way to reach new market segments. Customers have come to expect the freedom to consume a software offering on their own terms, which is why software companies and device vendors are increasingly turning to flexible licensing solutions.

=== Entitlement management ===
An entitlement management solution makes it possible to activate and provision cloud, on-premises, and embedded software applications from a single platform. Having the ability to manage homegrown or third-party licensing systems from one, centralized interface is conducive to an operationally efficient back office. With such a solution in place, time-consuming manual tasks can be automated for greater accuracy and reduced costs. Self-service web portals allow end users to perform a variety of tasks themselves, cutting down on support calls and improving customer satisfaction.

=== Usage tracking ===
Usage tracking provides essential business insight into end-user entitlements, as well as the consumption of products and features. Advanced data collection and reporting tools help optimize investment in the product roadmap and drive future business strategies. Only by analyzing end-user behaviors can software companies and device vendors make sound pricing, packaging, and marketing decisions that will improve their business processes and enhance the customer experience. Furthermore, making usage data accessible to users helps them stay in compliance with their license agreements

=== Advertising ===
The use of commercial advertisements and contextual advertisements have been a foundation of software monetization since free software first hit the market. Advertisements can come out in many different ways such as text ads, banners, short commercial videos and other types of software advertisements.

== Software Monetization Strategies ==
Software monetization is a critical aspect for developers and companies seeking to generate revenue from their software products. Strategies range from traditional models like one-time purchases, where users pay a single fee for perpetual access, to more dynamic approaches like subscriptions and freemium models, where users pay for ongoing access or advanced features. Other methods include advertising, licensing, and pay-per-use systems. The choice of monetization strategy depends on various factors including the software type, target audience, and desired revenue model. Emerging trends also indicate a move towards blockchain and value-based pricing. Effective monetization is essential for long-term success and sustainability in the software industry.

== Emerging trends ==
Many traditional device vendors still see themselves as hardware providers, first and foremost, even though the most valuable component of their offering is the embedded software driving it. However, since the advent of the Internet of Things (IoT), that paradigm is shifting toward a more software-centric focus, as device vendors large and small make the inevitable business transformation into software companies. The need to license software, manage entitlements, and protect trade secrets cuts across all industries; from medtech to industrial automation and telecommunications. Whatever industry a software company or device vendor happens to be in, or the delivery model it chooses, it requires a comprehensive software monetization program to future-proof its business and gain a competitive advantage.

== Antitrust compliance of software monetization ==
A number of software companies are some of the most profitable businesses in the world. For example, Amazon is the dominant market leader in e-commerce with 50% of all online sales in the United States going through the platform. Another highly-successful software company, Apple shares a duopoly with Alphabet in the field of mobile operating systems: 27% of the market share belonging to Apple (iOS) and 72% to Google (Android). Alphabet, Facebook and Amazon have been referred to as the "Big Three" of digital advertising.

In most jurisdictions around the world, is an essential legal obligation for any software company to utilize their software monetization strategy in compliance with antitrust laws. Unfortunately, the e-commerce is highly susceptible for antitrust violations that often have to do with improper software monetization. Some software companies systematically utilize price fixing, kickbacks, dividing territories, tying agreements and anticompetitive product bundling (although, not all product bundling is anticompetitive), refusal to deal and exclusive dealing, vertical restraints, horizontal territorial allocation, and similar anticompetitive practices to limit competition and to increase the opportunity for monetization.

In 2019 and 2020, the Big Tech industry become center of antitrust attention from the United States Department of Justice and the United States Federal Trade Commission that included requests to provide information about prior acquisitions and potentially anticompetitive practices. Some Democratic candidates running for president proposed plans to break up Big Tech companies and regulate them as utilities. "The role of technology in the economy and in our lives grows more important every day," said FTC Chairman Joseph Simons. "As I’ve noted in the past, it makes sense for us to closely examine technology markets to ensure consumers benefit from free and fair competition."

In June 2020, the European Union opened two new antitrust investigations into practices by Apple. The first investigation focuses on issues including whether Apple is using its dominant position in the market to stifle competition using its Apple music and book streaming services. The second investigation focuses on Apple Pay, which allows payment by Apple devices to brick and mortar vendors. Apple limits the ability of banks and other financial institutions to use the iPhones' near field radio frequency technology.

Fines are insufficient to deter anti-competitive practices by high tech giants, according to European Commissioner for Competition Margrethe Vestager. Commissioner Vestager explained, "fines are not doing the trick. And fines are not enough because fines are a punishment for illegal behaviour in the past. What is also in our decision is that you have to change for the future. You have to stop what you're doing."

Gig economy online marketplaces like Uber, Lyft, Handy, Amazon Home Services, DoorDash, and Instacart have perfected a process where workers deal bilaterally with gigs whose employers have none of the standard obligations of employers, while the platform operates the entire labor market to its own benefit – what some antitrust experts call a "for-profit hiring hall." Gig workers, such as Uber drivers are not employees, and hence Uber setting the terms on which they transact with customers, including fixing the prices charged to customers, constitutes a violation of the ban on restraints of trade in the Sherman Antitrust Act of 1890. In the United States, the issue of whether companies such as Uber is a price-fixing conspiracy, and whether that price fixing is horizontal has yet to be resolved at trial. In response to price fixing allegations, Uber publicly stated that: "we believe the law is on our side and that"s why in four years no anti-trust agency has raised this as an issue and there has been no similar litigation like it in the U.S."

The spirit of the antitrust law is to protect consumers from the anticompetitive behavior of businesses that have either monopoly power in their market or companies that have banded together to exert cartel market behavior. Monopoly or cartel collusion creates market disadvantages for consumers. However, the antitrust law clearly distinguishes between purposeful monopolies and businesses that found themselves in a monopoly position purely as the result of business success. The purpose of the antitrust law is to stop businesses from deliberately creating monopoly power.

Discussions of antitrust policy in software are often clouded by common myths about this widely misunderstood area of the law. For example, the United States federal Sherman Antitrust Act of 1890 criminalizes monopolistic business practices, specifically agreements that restraint of trade or commerce. At the same time, the Sherman Act allows organic creation of legitimately successful businesses that gain honest profits from consumers. The Act's main function is to preserve a competitive marketplace. The Big Tech companies are large and successful companies, but success alone is not reason enough for antitrust action. A legitimate breach of antitrust law must be the cause of any action against a business.

Antitrust law does not condemn a firm for developing a universally popular search engine, such as Google, even if that success leads to market dominance. It's how a monopoly is obtained or preserved that matters — not its mere existence.

== See also ==
- Big Tech
- Business models for open-source software
- Competition law
- Gig economy
- License manager
- Software protection dongle
- Video game monetization
- Website monetization
