= Ben Itzhak =

Ben Itzhak, Ben-Itzhak or Ben Itzhok (Hebrew: בן יצחק) is a Jewish surname literally meaning "son of Itzhak". Notable people with the surname include:

- Gonen Ben Itzhak, Israeli lawyer
- Itzik Ben-Itzhak, American professor of physics
- Yuval Ben-Itzhak, Israeli executive and entrepreneur

== Fictional characters ==
- Yankele ben Itzhok, the sidekick of The King of Schnorrers
