= Kuza Biashara =

Business training organisation based in Nairobi, Kenya

Kuza Biashara is an organization offering small business learning, training and empowerment in Africa. The organization is based in Nairobi, Kenya. In July 2015 Kuza Biashara partnered with The Coca-Cola Africa Foundation (TCCAF) in an arrangement dubbed The YES Initiative to train 25,000 youths on best practices of entrepreneurship and self-improvement. A pilot project was rolled out in Kibra Slums of Nairobi County the same year.

Since 2012 Kuza Biashara has been part of the Kenya Top 100 initiative which is sponsored by Nation Media Group and KPMG East Africa among others.

The organization operates under the mantra of Learn, Connect and Grow.

== Social Media Following ==
Kuza Biashara has developed a significantly large following on social media. Their blog has over 15,000 active subscribers and around 837,000 followers on Facebook as of February 2024. According to data from social media analytics and publishing company Socialbakers, As of August 2015, Kuza Biashara was the brand with the second largest Facebook audience in Kenya after Safaricom.
