= Zăpodea =

Zăpodea may refer to several places in Romania:

- Zăpodea, a village in Gălăuțaș Commune, Harghita County
- Zăpodea, a village in Sânger Commune, Mureș County
