= Preluca =

Preluca may refer to several villages in Romania:

- Preluca, a village in Horea Commune, Alba County
- Preluca, a village in Scărișoara Commune, Alba County
- Preluca, a village in Gălăuțaș Commune, Harghita County
- Preluca, a village in Pângărați Commune, Neamț County
- Preluca Nouă and Preluca Veche, villages in Copalnic-Mănăștur Commune, Maramureș County
