= Emplifi =

Company that provides social media network statistics and analysis

- Type: Private
- Industry: Customer experience software
- Predecessor: Astute, Socialbakers
- Founded: 2021
- Number of locations: 10
- Key people: Ohad Hecht, CEO
- Number of employees: >600
- Website: emplifi.io

Emplifi is an American private company headquartered in Columbus, Ohio. It develops and markets customer experience systems. The business was founded in 2020 after social media analytics company Socialbakers was acquired by customer experience systems business Astute. The combined entity changed its name to Emplifi.

== History ==
Emplifi's predecessor Socialbakers was a social media monitoring and analytics company based in Prague, Czech Republic, founded in 2008.

In 2014, Socialbakers acquired Facebook monitoring and analytics company EdgeRank Checker. The next year, Socialbakers co-founder and CEO Jan Rezab resigned and Robert Lang was appointed CEO. By 2016, Socialbakers had 350 employees, about $30–50 million in annual revenues, and had raised $34 million in total funding over the years.

In 2020, customer engagement software company Astute acquired Socialbakers. At the time, Socialbakers was one of the last remaining major independent social media analytics companies. In June 2021, the companies rebranded as Emplifi, and Socialbakers CEO Yuval Ben-Itzhak became president of Emplifi. The name combines the words "empathy" and "amplification." That September, Emplifi acquired video-streaming service Go Instore. In 2022, Emplifi attained unicorn status with an additional investment that valued the business at more than $1 billion.

== Operations ==
Emplifi has offices worldwide. As of September 2021, the company reported 750 employees.
