= Isaacs Creek =

Isaacs Creek may refer to:

- Isaacs Creek (Missouri)
- Isaacs Creek (Virginia)
