= Ishak =

Ishak, Ishaq or Eshaq may refer to:

- Ishak (name), list of people with this given name or surname
- Isaaq, a Somali clan-family in the Horn of Africa
- Ishaaq bin Ahmed, the forefather and common ancestor of the Isaaq clan-family
- Atakapa, a Native American people who call themselves the Ishak
- Ishak, Iran, a village in South Khorasan Province
- Eshaqabad, Shahr-e Babak, village in Kerman Province, Iran also known as Esḩāq or Is-hāq

== See also ==
- Isaac (disambiguation)
- Izak (disambiguation)
- Ishak Pasha Palace
