= Márton Izsák =

Transylvanian monument sculptor

- Born: 12 April 1913; Galócás, Austria-Hungary
- Died: 1 February 2004 (aged 90); Târgu Mureș, Romania
- Education: College of Applied Arts, Budapest
- Occupation: sculptor
- Years active: 1947–1983

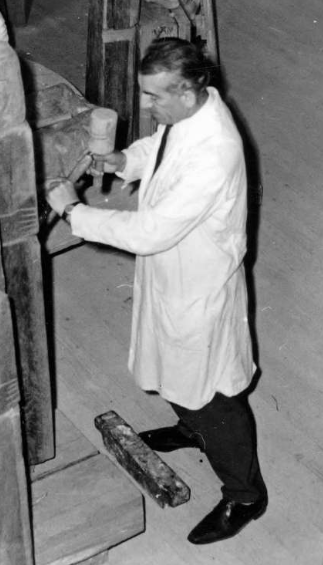
Izsák sculpting in Târgu Mureș

Márton Izsák (12 April 1913 – 1 February 2004) was a prolific Transylvanian Jewish sculptor of Hungarian descent, noted personality and recipient of the honorary citizenship award from the city of Târgu Mureș, Romania.

The son of Jakab Izsák (a government official, professional soldier, and eventual store owner), by arranged marriage to Vilma Friedmann, Márton was born in Galócás (now Gălăuțaș, Harghita County). After his family home in Gheorgheni burned down in World War I, his family spent some years in Petelea, before eventually settling down in Târgu Mureș.

After moving to the city, he spent some time apprenticing in furniture making under an artist named Géza Rózsa, who noted Márton's artistic talent. At the artist's behest, Márton's father enrolled him in an arts program, and he spent the next 3 years learning how to carve at the Industrial High School in Târgu Mureș. Before finishing, he was invited by Rózsa to complete high school, and then continue to an arts degree, at the College of Applied Arts in Budapest, graduating (notably early for his age) in 1933. While at the college, he studied under notable sculptors Imre Simay and Lajos Mátrai.

In the late 1930s he returned home to Târgu Mureș, where he gained recognition and eventually presented his works in personal exhibitions in 1936 and in 1937. He remained there until his deportation at the beginning of World War II, despite his fathers' World War I medals, which should have afforded some protection.

In 1940, as a result of the Second Vienna Award, Northern Transylvania (including Târgu Mureș) was annexed by Hungary. During the war, Izsák lost 25 relatives, including his mother, in the Nazi death camps of the Holocaust. After Romanian and Soviet troops regained control of the region in Fall 1944, he returned to the city from labor camp. He worked as an instructor and eventually art director at the acclaimed Art High School in Târgu Mureș, 1945 to 1974.

During his time at the art school, he produced many notable works, including several collaborations with István Csorvássy. His Monument to the Deportees, erected in Dej in front of the local Orthodox synagogue is one of the earliest Holocaust memorials to be erected in Europe, and memorializes c. 7,000 Jews relocated to the nearby Dej ghetto and eventually deported and killed at Auschwitz-Birkenau. Many of his other works still are on display in several cities, but primarily in Târgu Mureș – including the notable "Two Bolyai" in Bolyai Square in Târgu Mureș.

The mysterious overnight removal, in 1962 of his statue of Joseph Stalin, erected just five years earlier in 1957, is remembered as signifying the metaphorical end of the Soviet occupation of Romania during De-Stalinization in Romania.

In 2003, a public Holocaust memorial was erected in Târgu Mureș, based on a cast and plans originally produced for the city of Dej in 1947. Shortly before his death, he was ordained as Cetățean de onoare (Honorary Citizen, an order recognizing civic contribution) for the city.

== Mysterious disappearance of the Stalin statue in 1962 ==
According to local tales, the Târgu Mureș statue was not officially destroyed — it simply disappeared overnight, without indication of where it went or what was done with it. All this occurred against a background of significant political upheaval, including the start and end of the Magyar Autonomous Region, the de-Stalinization process, and Romania's gradual distancing from the Warsaw Pact.

The event has entered public folklore, and to this day continues to be a subject of conversation and the source of several urban myths — for example, the popular idea that the statue was originally meant to contain a library in its base (which is also a myth related to the Bucharest statue), or that the library was actually constructed — still currently exists. Some claim that the statue is still stored inside.

== Selected works ==
His works include the following:

Statue of Béla Bartók in Târgu Mureș

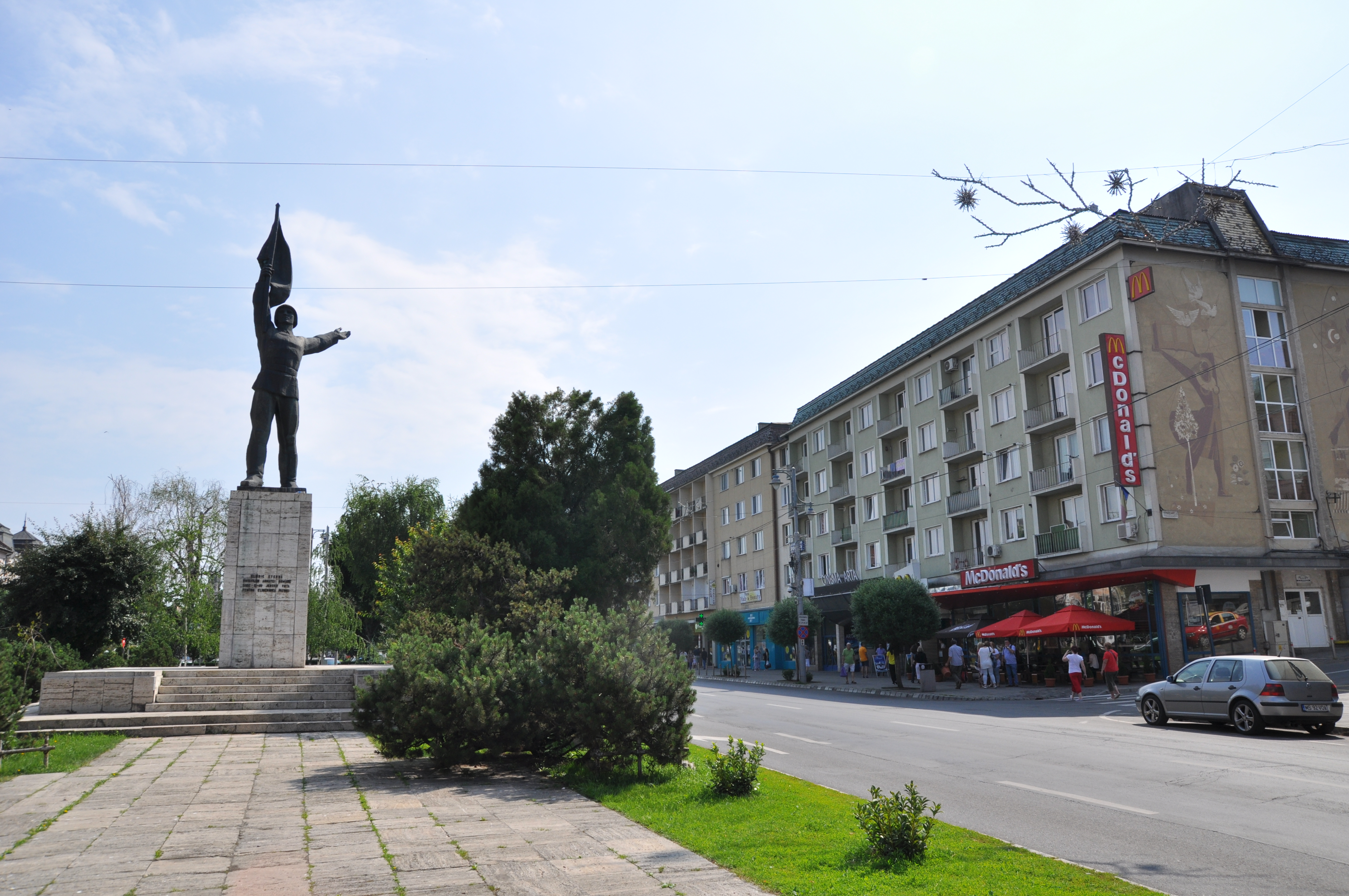
Unknown Soldier Monument, Târgu Mureș

- Monument to the Deportees (Bronze, 1947, Dej)
- Wedding customs (relief, 1951, Sfântu Gheorghe, theater façade)
- Nicolae Bălcescu (bust, in Sfântu Gheorghe)
- István Szentgyörgyi (1953, Târgu Mureș, in front of the College of Theater)
- Stalin (1955, Târgu Mureș with István Csorvássy; demolished in 1962)
- Farkas Bolyai and János Bolyai (also known as the Two Bolyais Statue), in front of the Farkas Bolyai Theoretical High School in Târgu Mureș, with István Csorvássy)
- "Unknown Soldier Monument" (bronze, 1963 to 1964, Târgu Mureș, War Memorial, Main Square, with István Csorvássy)
- The poet Ernő Salamon (20 February 1968, in front of the Salamon Ernő High School, Gheorgheni)
- Mihai Eminescu (1969, 1989 Târgu Mureș)
- Andor Bernath (1974, Saint John the Baptist Church, Târgu Mureș)
- Béla Bartók (bust, 1980, Târgu Mureș)
- George Enescu statue composition (1983, Târgu Mureș)
- Holocaust Memorial (2003, Târgu Mureș)
