= Charlemagne Azongnitode =

Beninese footballer (born 2001)

Personal information
- Date of birth: 8 August 2001 (age 25)
- Place of birth: Benin
- Height: 1.87 m (6 ft 2 in)
- Position: Centre back

Team information
- Current team: TPS
- Number: 15

Senior career*
Years	Team	Apps	(Gls)
2021	USS Kraké		
2021–2022	ASVO		
2022	Dadjé		
2022–2024	Oman Club	18	(1)
2024–2025	Hapoel Petah Tikva	2	(0)
2025	Hapoel Acre	14	(0)
2025	AC Oulu	8	(0)
2026–	TPS	12	(0)

International career^{‡}
2026–	Benin	2	(0)
- * Club domestic league appearances and goals as of 13 November 2026 ‡ National team caps and goals as of 21:35, 6 June 2026 (UTC)

Charlemagne Azongnitode (born 8 August 2001) is a Beninese professional footballer, playing as a centre back for Veikkausliiga club TPS and the Benin national team.

== Club career ==
After starting his senior career in his native Benin, Azongnitode signed with Oman Club in 2022.

During the 2024–25 season, he played in Israeli second-tier Liga Leumit for Hapoel Petah Tikva and Hapoel Acre.

On 30 July 2025, Azongnitode signed with Finnish Veikkausliiga club AC Oulu.

== International career ==
Azongnitode was called up to the Benin national team for a set of friendlies in March 2026.
