= International Society for Analysis, its Applications and Computation =

The International Society for Analysis, its Applications and Computation (ISAAC) was founded at the University of Delaware in 1996 and is dedicated to the promotion of mathematical analysis and its applications. It has organized international congresses biannually since 1996 and supported regional conferences in various fields of analysis in developing countries since then. The society has members from all inhabited continents, and the elected ISAAC Board has members from almost all continents. Robert Gilbert (University of Delaware), Heinrich Begehr (Free University Berlin), MW Wong (York University), Michael Ruzhansky (Imperial College London), Luigi Rodino (University of Turin), Michael Reissig (TU Bergakademie Freiberg), and Uwe Kähler (University of Aveiro) served as its past presidents. The current president is Joachim Toft (Linnaeus University).

== Conferences ==
International ISAAC Congresses have taken place biannually (with one three-year interval) since 1996, in the following locations:

- University of Delaware, Newark, USA (1996)
- Fukuoka University, Fukuoka, Japan (1998)
- Free University Berlin, Berlin, Germany (2001)
- York University, Toronto, Canada (2003)
- University of Catania, Catania, Italy (2005)
- Middle East Technical University, Ankara, Turkey (2007)
- Imperial College London, London, UK (2009)
- Peoples' Friendship University of Russia, Moscow, Russia (2011)
- Pedagogical University of Krakow, Krakow, Poland (2013)
- University of Macao, Macau, China (2015)
- Linnaeus University, Växjö, Sweden (2017)
- University of Aveiro, Aveiro, Portugal (2019)
- Ghent University, Ghent, Belgium (2021) (in online form)
- University of São Paulo, Ribeirão Preto, Brazil (2023)
- Nazarbayev University, Astana, Kazakstan (2025)

These congresses have attracted an increasing number of analysts and applied mathematicians from around the world.

The next ISAAC Congress is due to be held in Jimei University, Xiamen, China, during 8 August to 14 August, 2027.

== Organizational structure ==
The governing body of the society is the Board of Directors, commonly referred to as the ISAAC Board, which contains up to 19 members at any one time, including the president, vice-president, secretary and treasurer. The Board is elected by the ISAAC membership, and the officers are elected by the Board, with two-year terms usually punctuated by ISAAC Congresses. The current Board members at any time are listed on the ISAAC website, and the Board of Directors is legally and financially responsible for the society.

The current ISAAC president and officers are as follows.

- President: Joachim Toft (Linnaeus University, Växjö, Sweden), 2025 -
- Vice-President: Paula Cerejeiras (University of Aveiro, Portugal).
- Secretary and Treasurer: Irene Sabadini (Polytechnic University of Milan, Italy).

Earlier presidents are as follows, since the foundation of the society.

- Robert Gilbert (University of Delaware, USA), 1996 - 2001.
- Heinrich Begehr (Free University Berlin, Germany), 2001 - 2005.
- Man Wah Wong (York University, Toronto, Canada), 2005 - 2009.
- Michael Ruzhansky (Imperial College London, UK), 2009 - 2013.
- Luigi Rodino (University of Turin, Italy), 2013 - 2017.
- Michael Reissig (TU Bergakademie Freiberg, Germany) 2017-2021.
- Uwe Kähler (University of Aveiro, Portugal) 2021 - 2025.

== Special Interest Groups ==
To promote different areas of mathematical analysis within the broad scope of ISAAC, certain Special Interest Groups have been created within ISAAC. Some of these have regularly organized workshops, mini-symposia, or special sessions at ISAAC Congresses. Any Special Interest Group with sufficiently many members is automatically represented on the ISAAC Board. The currently active Special Interest Groups are as follows.

- ISAAC Group in Pseudo-Differential Operators (IGPDO)
- ISAAC Group in Partial Differential Equations (IGPDE)
- ISAAC Group in Generalized Functions (IGGF)
- ISAAC Interest Group in Complex Analysis (IGCA)
- ISAAC Group in Integral Transforms and Reproducing Kernels (IGITRK)
- ISAAC Interest Group in Clifford and Quaternionic Analysis (IGCQA)
- ISAAC Interest Group in Complex Variables and Potential Theory (IGCVPT)
- ISAAC Group: Spectral Analysis of Boundary Value Problems (IGSABV)
- Operator Theory and Harmonic Analysis (OTHA)
- Fractional Calculus & Applied Analysis (FCAA)
