= Izak (disambiguation) =

Izak is a given name.

Izak may also refer to:

- Izak catshark, a type of cat shark
- Izak, a character in the video game Suikoden IV
- Piotr "Izak" Skowyrski, Polish esports commentator and streamer
- Vian Izak, American singer/songwriter, producer, and audio engineer

== See also ==
- Izakaya, a Japanese drinking establishment
- Izakaya Chōji, a Japanese film
- Izaskun Aramburu, a Spanish canoer
- Itzig family, German-Jewish family
- Itzig, Luxembourg, a town
- Itz, river in Germany
- Izaak Walton League, environmental organization
- Izaak-Walton-Killam Award, awarded to Canadian researchers
- Izaak Synagogue, in Kraków, Poland
- Isakhel, a town in Pakistan
- Isakhel Tehsil, area in Pakistan
- Izsák (Hungary), a town in Hungary
- Izsak (crater) on the Moon
