= Charles Edward Isaacs =

American physician and anatomist

Charles Edward Isaacs (June 24, 1811 – June 16, 1860) was an American medical doctor and anatomist who was among the first to examine the structure and functioning of the kidneys. Following the studies made by Sir William Bowman about fifteen years earlier, he examined the role of the renal glomeruli in excretion.

== Biography ==
Isaacs was born in Bedford, New York, the youngest of five children in a farming family. He went to a parish school and then began to study medicine at the College of Physicians and Surgeons, New York followed by an MD in 1832 from the University of Maryland, Baltimore. He served as an army surgeon and rode with Native American tribes around the Southern States. He served at Governor's Island, Fort Kent, Maine, and Copper, Lake Superior, before moving to Fort Niagara in 1845. He resigned the next year and started a private medical school along with W. H. Van Buren in New York. He later became a demonstrator of anatomy at the College of Physicians and Surgeons and still later served as a ship surgeon, travelling to Europe. He also served as an adjunct professor of anatomy at the University Medical College and ran a practice in Brooklyn.

A major contribution of Isaacs was his study of kidney tissue and the experimental examination of the role of glomeruli or Malphigian coils as he called them in renal functioning based on renal tissues obtained from a range of animals. He published his findings in 1856 and 1857.

Isaacs may have contracted malaria early in his career and although he died at Brooklyn of pleuropneumonia, he had long suffered from a malarial infection and had Bright's disease.
