= Ladislav Izsák =

Hungarian footballer

Personal information
- Full name: Ladislav Izsak
- Date of birth: 13 October 1954 (age 72)
- Place of birth: Oradea, Romania
- Position: Midfielder

Youth career
- 1966–1968: Bihor Oradea

Senior career*
Years	Team	Apps	(Gls)
1968–1972	Bihor Oradea	41	(3)
1972–1973	Apollon Athens	5	(0)
1973–1974	Hapoel Daliyat	9	(2)
1975–1977	Richmond Brighouse	39	(12)
Total		94	(17)
- * Club domestic league appearances and goals

Ladislav Izsák (Hungarian: Izsak Lászlo, born 13 October 1954) is a retired Hungarian footballer. He played as a central defender or defensive midfielder and spent the majority of his playing career at FC Bihor Oradea. He would also spend time playing in Greece and Israel as well as Canada after his family's immigration to Vancouver in the 1970s.

== Youth career ==
Growing up playing for the famous youth program at Bihor Oradea he would play alongside future stars such as Zoltan Crișan, Attila Kun and Alexandru Sătmăreanu. He would eventually make his senior debut in 1968.

== Professional career ==
He would spend the next 4 years of his career with Bihor Oradea before eventually immigrating to Greece where he would join 2nd Division side Apollon Athens. Registering just 5 starts and no goals.

In the summer of 1973 he would leave on a free transfer to Liga Leumit side Hapoel Daliyat registering 2 goals in 9 starts.

In 1974 his family would immigrate to Vancouver, British Columbia, Canada where he would join semi-professional side Richmond Brighouse choosing to retire at the end of the 1977 season.

== Personal life ==
Currently resides in Vancouver, BC with his wife and son Robert Izsak.
