= Isaacs Creek (Missouri) =

Stream in Ripley County, Missouri, United States

Isaacs Creek is a stream in Ripley County in the U.S. state of Missouri. It is a tributary of the Current River.

The stream headwaters arise at 36°42′34″N 90°50′02″W at an elevation of approximately 585 feet. It flows to the southwest entering the Mark Twain National Forest and then turns to the south and flows roughly parallel to Missouri Route Y. It crosses under Route Y and enters the Current at 36°39′18″N 90°51′37″W approximately 2.5 miles northwest of Doniphan and an elevation of 341 feet.

Isaacs Creek has the name of Isaac Payne, an early citizen.

== See also ==
- List of rivers of Missouri
