= Salamon Ernő High School =

School in Gheorgheni, Romania

Coordinates: 46.7237°N 25.6001°E

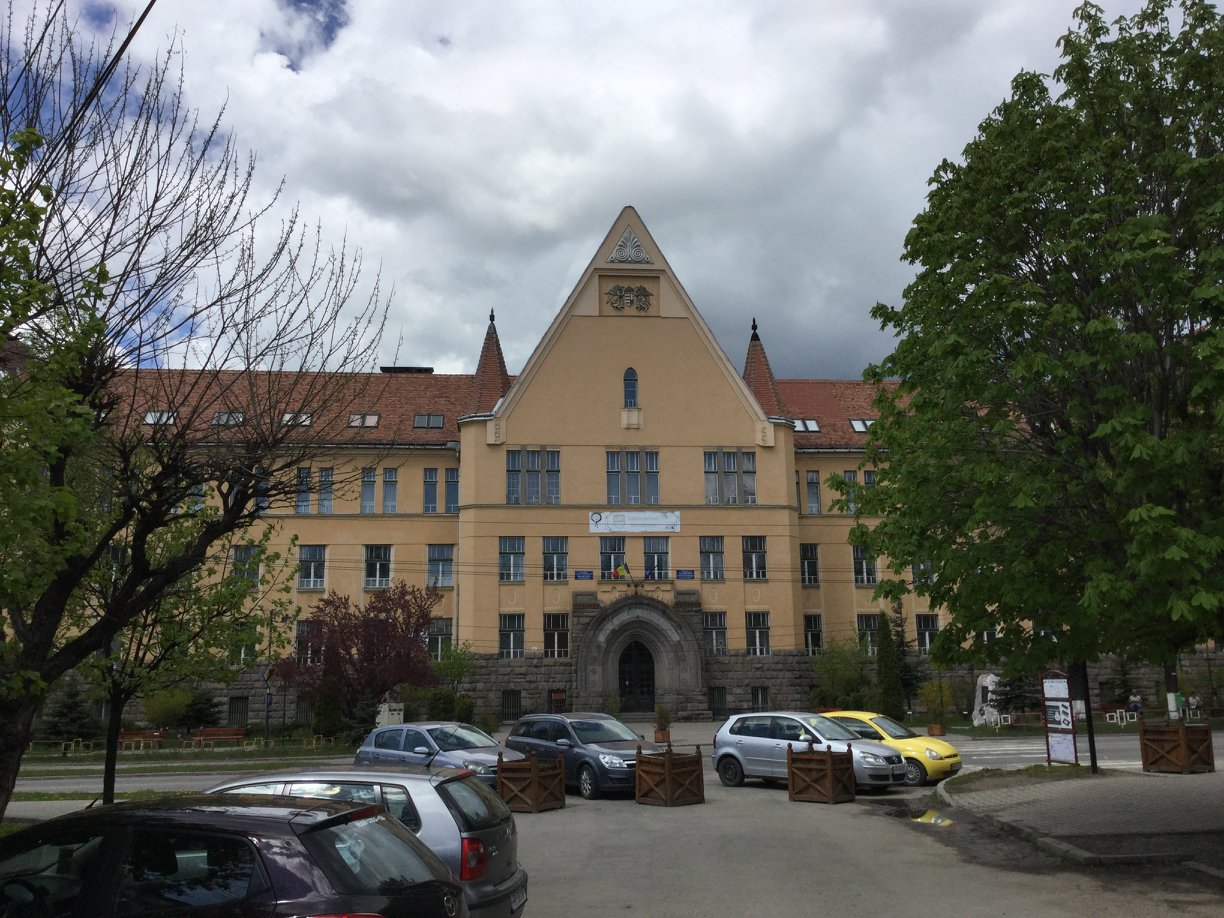
Salamon Ernő High School

Salamon Ernő High School (Romanian: Liceul Teoretic Salamon Ernő; Hungarian: Salamon Ernő Gimnázium) is a high school located at 3-5 Lacul Roșu Boulevard, Gheorgheni, Romania.

The school originates at the turn of the 20th century, when the area was part of Austria-Hungary. In 1897, the city council called upon the Hungarian Education Ministry to turn the state boys’ school into a high school. The request was renewed in 1905, when the government stipulated a contribution of 300,000 korona, which were raised the same year. The high school opened in 1908, although the question of a permanent building remained unresolved, with site plans being drawn up months later. Building plans were approved in 1912. The architects were from Budapest, while the carving was done by a local craftsman, using stone from Lăzarea. The Art Nouveau building was inaugurated in 1915. The following year, classes were suspended due to World War I, and a military hospital was set up inside. Until the union of Transylvania with Romania, Hungarian was the language of teaching, with Romanian offered in parallel classes.

In 1921, the new Romanian authorities removed the coat of arms of Hungary from the façade. Two years later, instruction switched to Romanian, with Hungarian becoming an optional subject. The situation became reversed in 1940, after the Second Vienna Award. Starting with the 1944-1945 year, when Hungary again lost control over the area, the building hosted separate Romanian and Hungarian schools. A sports department was introduced in 1954. The two high schools were merged in 1956, while the resulting school continued to be bilingual. In 1968, it was named for an alumnus, the poet Ernő Salamon. The institution became an industrial high school in 1977, and Hungarian classes were sharply reduced.

In January 1990, just after the Romanian Revolution, Salamon Ernő became a Hungarian-language school. Drawing, music and Romani language classes were introduced in 1998. The building was restored in 2001–2003, with language laboratories set up in the attic. In 2004, a tombstone carver restored the tree of life motif to the facade, based on the original plans. A new wing housing a Romanian high school opened in 2009. The Hungarian coat of arms was restored in 2011. This sparked discussion at the national level, with Senator Lia Olguța Vasilescu writing to Education Minister Daniel Funeriu, asking for an explanation. He replied that he had approved the move, calling the seal a "façade ornament" not subject to laws governing the symbols of foreign countries.

The school building is listed as a historic monument by Romania's Ministry of Culture and Religious Affairs.
