= Victor Isakov =

Victor Isakov (November 4, 1947 – May 14, 2021) was a mathematician working in the field of inverse problems for partial differential equations and related topics (potential theory, uniqueness of continuation and Carleman estimates, nonlinear functional analysis and calculus of variation). He was a distinguished professor in the Department of Mathematics and Statistics at Wichita State University.

His areas of professional interest included:

- Inverse problems of gravimetry (general uniqueness conditions and local solvability theorems) and related problems of imaging including prospecting active part of the brain and the source of noise of the aircraft from exterior measurements of electromagnetic and acoustical fields.
- Inverse problems of conductivity (uniqueness of discontinuous conductivity and numerical methods) and their applications to medical imaging and nondestructive testing of materials for cracks and inclusions.
- Inverse scattering problems (uniqueness and stability of penetrable and soft scatterers).
- Finding constitutional laws from experimental data (reconstructing nonlinear partial differential equation from all or some boundary data).
- Uniqueness of the continuation for hyperbolic equations and systems of mathematical physics.
- The inverse option pricing problem.

== Publications ==
Isakov had over 90 publications in print or in preparation as of late 2005, which include:

- Increased stability in the continuation of solutions to the Helmholtz equation (with Tomasz Hrycak), Inverse Problems, 20(2004), 697-712.
- Inverse Problems for Partial Differential Equations, Applied Mathematical Sciences (Springer-Verlag), Vol 127, 2nd ed., 2006. ISBN 0-387-25364-5

Presentations:

He delivered invited talks at international and national conferences and universities in Austria, Canada, China, Finland, France, Germany, Italy, Japan, Poland, Russia, Sweden, Switzerland, South Korea, Tunisia, and United Kingdom.

He was a principal speaker at the summer AMS-SIAM research conferences in Boulder, CO (1999), South Hadley, MA (1998, 1995), Seattle, WA (1995), at programs on Inverse Problems at MSRI, Berkeley, CA(2001), IPAM, Los Angeles (2003, 2005, 2006), RICAM, Linz, Austria (2009), Universidad Autonoma de Madrid, Spain, Isaac Newton Institute for Mathematical Sciences, Cambridge, England,(2011), and at international conferences in Edinburgh, UK (2000), St. Petersburg, Russia, Gargnano, Italy, Hong Kong, China (2001), Cortona and Pisa, Italy (2002), Banff Center and the Fields Institute, Toronto, Canada, and Seville, Spain (2003), IMA, Minneapolis, Helsinki, Finland, Fethiye, Turkey (2004), Catania, Italy (2005), Banff, Canada, Sapporo, Japan (2006), Cracow, Poland, vancouver, Canada (2007), Ecole Normale, Paris, France, Orlando, Florida, Cortona, Italy, Shanghai, China (2008), Linz, Austria, Manchester, England (2009), Valparaiso, Chile, Wuhan, China, Dresden, Germany, Pisa, Bologna, Italy (2010), Trieste, Gargnano, Italy (2011).

He gave colloquium talks at the Courant Institute of New York University, Northwestern University, City University of Hong Kong, Fudan University (China), Universities of Goettingen, Muenster (Germany), Florence, Milan, Rome, Trieste (Italy), Linz (Austria), Kyoto and Tokyo (Japan).

He was on editorial boards of the international journals Applicable Analysis, Inverse Problems and Imaging, Evolution Equations and Control Theory, J. Inverse Ill-Posed Problems.

After 1990, his research has been supported by the NSF. The last grant was: "Stability issues in some biomedical, financial, and geophysical inverse problems" NSF DMS-2008154 (2020-2023) $255,214.
