= Isaac (disambiguation) =

Isaac was one of the patriarchs of the Abrahamic faiths.

Isaac may also refer to:

- Isaac (name), including a list of people and fictional characters with the given name or surname of Isaac and its variants

== Organizations ==
- International Society for Analysis, its Applications and Computation
- International Society for Augmentative and Alternative Communication
- International Symposium on Algorithms and Computation

== Places ==
- Great Isaac Cay, Bahamas
- Issac, Dordogne, Nouvelle-Aquitaine, France
- Isaac River, Australia
- Isaac Region, Australia
- Isaac's Harbour, Nova Scotia, Canada
- Isaac's Harbour North, Nova Scotia, Canada
- Port Isaac, Cornwall, United Kingdom

== Other uses ==
- Infrared Spectrometer And Array Camera (ISAAC)), an instrument on the Very Large Telescope
- ISAAC (cipher), a cryptographically secure pseudorandom number generator
- ISAAC (comics), a supercomputer in Marvel Comics
- Isaac (talk show), a talk show hosted by Isaac Mizrahi
- List of storms named Isaac, used for various tropical cyclones
- "Isaac" (song), a song by Hollyn
- "Isaac", a song by Madonna, from her album Confessions on a Dance Floor
- Isaac, the northeasternmost country in the Fire Emblem universe continent Jugdral

== See also ==
- Isaacs (disambiguation)
- Isaaq, a Somali clan
- Ishak (disambiguation)
- International Symposium on Symbolic and Algebraic Computation (ISSAC)
- Izak (disambiguation)
- Izzy (disambiguation)
- Zack (disambiguation)
