= Ashbak =

Village in South Khorasan province, Iran

Ashbak اشباك
- Village
- Location within Iran
- Coordinates: 31°36′36″N 59°22′39″E
- Country: Iran
- Province: South Khorasan
- County: Nehbandan
- Bakhsh: Central
- Rural District: Meyghan

Population (2006)
  - Total: 57
- Time zone: UTC+3:30 (IRST)
  - Summer (DST): UTC+4:30 (IRDT)

Ashbak (Persian: اشباك, also Romanized as Ashbāk and Eshbāk; also known as Eshak and Ishāk) is a village in Meyghan Rural District, in the Central District of Nehbandan County, South Khorasan Province, Iran. At the 2006 census, its population was 57, in 15 families.
