= Tal Archel =

Israeli footballer

Tal Archel טל ארצ'ל
Personal information
- Full name: Tal Archel
- Date of birth: 10 June 2003 (age 23)
- Place of birth: Rishon LeZion, Israel
- Height: 1.87 m (6 ft 1 1/2 in)
- Position: Centre-back

Team information
- Current team: Hapoel Tel Aviv
- Number: 18

Youth career
- 2011–2023: Hapoel Tel Aviv

Senior career*
Years	Team	Apps	(Gls)
2023–	Hapoel Tel Aviv	44	(1)
2025	→ Hapoel Kfar Saba	16	(0)

International career
2021–2022	Israel U19	13	(0)
2023–2024	Israel U21	2	(0)
- * Club domestic league appearances and goals as of 23 June 2026

Tal Archel (Hebrew: טל ארצ'ל; born 10 June 2003) is an Israeli footballer who currently plays as a centre-back for Hapoel Tel Aviv.

== Career statistics ==
=== Club ===
As of 1 June 2025.

Club	Season	League			State Cup		Toto Cup		Continental		Other		Total	
Club	Season	Division	Apps	Goals	Apps	Goals	Apps	Goals	Apps	Goals	Apps	Goals	Apps	Goals
Hapoel Tel Aviv	2022–23	Israeli Premier League	1	0	0	0	1	0	–		0	0	2	0
Hapoel Tel Aviv	2023–24	Israeli Premier League	24	1	1	0	2	0	–		0	0	27	1
Hapoel Tel Aviv	2024–25	Liga Leumit	4	0	0	0	5	0	–		0	0	9	0
Hapoel Tel Aviv	Total		29	1	1	0	8	0	0	0	0	0	38	1
Hapoel Kfar Saba	2024–25	Liga Leumit	16	0	0	0	0	0	–		0	0	16	0
Hapoel Kfar Saba	Total		16	0	0	0	0	0	0	0	0	0	16	0
Career total			45	1	1	0	8	0	0	0	0	0	54	1
