= Vian Izak =

American singer-songwriter

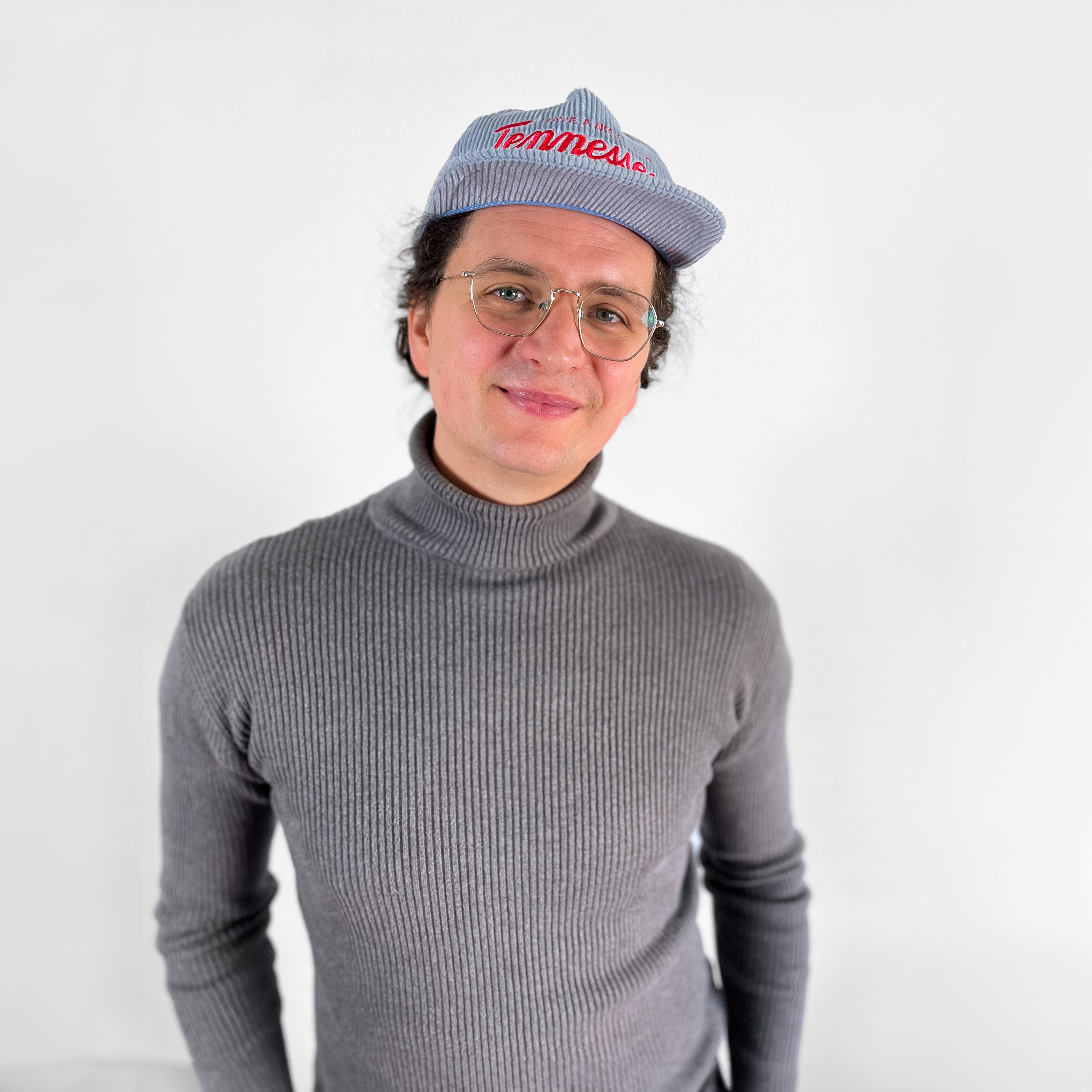
- Vian Izak in 2024 retrieved from Flickr

Background information
- Origin: Nashville, Tennessee, United States
- Years active: 2014–present
- Labels: Vohnic Music LLC, Merlin Network
- Spouse: Sarah Jane Woods
- Website: http://www.vianizak.com

Vian Izak, is a South African American alternative folk singer-songwriter, record producer, and audio engineer. He created an animated alias to maintain his anonymity online. Izak's artist project is part of the virtual band movement popularized by acts such as the Gorillaz and The Archies where the members of the group are portrayed as animations. Although he later dropped the animated persona in favor of personally connecting with his audience, this early focus on multimedia releases, including visual art, comics, and storytelling, has continued.

He has worked with artists Ladysmith Black Mambazo, Keith Getty, and Kristyn Getty. He is known for his songs "The London Air Raids" and "Revolver." He also owns and operates his own independent record label called Vohnic Music LLC in Nashville. The record label is part of the Merlin Network which is the world's fourth largest music rights holder after Universal Music Group, Sony, and the Warner Music Group. Vian also produces more electronic based music under the name I the AI and has used the label I the AI Records to release both his own music and Juniper Vale's.

Vian is married to Sarah Jane Wood (stage name Juniper Vale). The pair have also released many songs together, and Vian has produced all of Juniper Vale's solo work to date.

Many of Vian's songs, including popular tracks "The London Air Raids" and "Revolver", were written by his brother Hein Zaayman.

== Career ==
=== 2015–2019: Early career and music ===
Vian is a South African immigrant who moved to the United States in 2000. His love of songwriting started out of a need to communicate as English was not his native language. He cites U2, Coldplay, and Death Cab for Cutie as early influences. As a young man he moved to Nashville and opened a recording studio on the historic Music Row. Izak brought an international sound to the Nashville music scene which made him stand out. This is exemplified in his collaborations with Grammy winning South African group Ladysmith Black Mambazo on "Brink of Love" and with Grammy winning Italian composer Davide Rossi on "Sangre de Cristo".

He often combines his music with the illustrations of his brother, Hein Zaayman, to create multimedia comic stories. His first multimedia release, Northern Anthems (2018), was nominated for numerous awards including two Independent Music Awards. Music streaming platform Spotify also highlighted the release as a unique project from Nashville.

Starting in February 2019, Vian ran a 13-episode podcast series called "Sounds About Music" where he interviewed other creatives and discussed the process of creating his second album, The Navigator (2019). Guests included artists from his Vohnic Music label, illustrator Hein Zaayman, and more.

=== 2020: Music and COVID aid ===
In March 2020 Vian worked with U.S. Bancorp to release a COVID-19 television advertisement using his song "Things Will Get Better" encouraging people to stay hopeful in hard times. The advertisement was played nationally in the United States. Additionally, Izak released a music video for his song "The Navigator" thanking healthcare workers for their bravery during the pandemic which received over fifty thousand views on Facebook and YouTube.

=== 2020-2021: Third studio album, Flight of the Aeronaut ===
In 2020, Vian followed the release of his 2019 album The Navigator with a deluxe edition featuring additional songs, as well as a short webcomic following the concept of the album, which can still be viewed on his website. Unlike the Vian Izak's Adventures comic, a print version was never released. Vian also released an animated YouTube lyric video for the song The Navigator, as well as a behind the scenes look with the director, Michael Saby.

Later in 2020, he began releasing one song each month leading up to the July 2021 release of his third album, Flight of The Aeronaut. The album and accompanying singles featured artwork by his brother Hein Zaayman. The album was also released on Vinyl, his only LP to date to have done so.

On March 24, 2021, Vian performed a live acoustic concert in Nashville, playing songs from Flight of The Aeronaut. He performed alongside Sarah Jane from Juniper Vale and string instrumentalist RǾRE. Recordings from this concert were later released on YouTube, as well as on streaming services as the EP Vian Izak Live 2021.

Vian also released Vian Izak: After Hours EP in October 2021, a collaboration with UK composer Ben Laver. It features instrumental arrangements of six of Vian's songs in a jazzy, lo-fi style.

=== 2022-2023: Fourth studio album, All the Worlds We Built ===
Vian continued this same method of continuous releases for his fourth album All the Worlds We Built, releasing one song each month from May 2022 until the album's release in February 2023. Each release was accompanied by an exclusive poster, with artwork done by Andreas Rocha. The concept of the album is loosely based on the Berlin Wall, as well as a Sci-Fi story that Vian developed while traveling through Europe. The album includes features from German band Who's Amy, UK electronic project ah BLOOM, saxophone player Max Abrams, and more, all contributing to the international nature of the project.

Vian released a short comic book alongside the album, his third time to do so. Incorporating illustrations by Andreas Rocha and AI art, the comic warns about the dangers of machines taking the place of human expression. The comic was one of the first that incorporated AI art and human art equally. A limited number of print versions of the comic were available for purchase online. Izak eventually announced that he will no longer use any AI art in his album covers after learning more about how the models were trained on copyrighted works without compensation to the owners.

=== 2024: Fifth studio album, Where Do We End Up When Life Goes On? ===
In April 2024, Vian Izak released his fifth studio album, Where Do We End Up When Life Goes On?. The album was noted in independent reviews for its focus on themes of grief, reflection, and emotional processing. It continues Izak’s pattern of releasing conceptual, narrative-driven projects that blend music with broader storytelling elements.

=== 2026: Sixth studio album, The Reign of the Heart ===
On May 15, 2026, Izak released his sixth studio album, The Reign of the Heart. The 11-track record combines indie rock, folk, and piano-driven pop, with lyrics exploring themes of love, trauma, identity, and faith. The album includes the duet "Hallelujah Hope" with singer-songwriter Juniper Vale.

The album received positive reviews from independent music publications. Writing for AnalogueTrash, Mark Buckley praised its melodic songwriting and thematic progression from isolation toward hope and self-acceptance, drawing comparisons to Coldplay, Keane, and Tom Odell. Happy Mag similarly highlighted the album's acoustic instrumentation and introspective songwriting, describing its exploration of personal struggle and emotional resilience.

== Discography ==
=== Albums ===
- Northern Anthems (Album, 2018)
- The Navigator (Album, 2019)
- The Navigator (Deluxe Edition) (Album, 2020)
- Flight of the Aeronaut (Album, 2021)
- Flight of the Aeronaut (Companion Edition) (Album, 2021)
- All the Worlds We Built (Album, 2023)
- where do we end up when life goes on? (Album, 2024)
- The Reign of the Heart (Album, 2026)

=== EPs and singles ===
- Revolver (Single, 2016)
- Brink of Love (EP, 2016) features Ladysmith Black Mambazo and Eliza Ramgren
- Revolver Remixes (EP, 2016) single charted on Spotify's Viral Charts in Canada at #19.
- The Astronaut (EP, 2017)
- The Astronaut Acoustic (EP, 2017)
- Will I Find My Home (Single, 2017)
- Starlit Summer's Eve (EP, 2017)
- Till Your Heart is Still (EP, 2017)
- The London Air Raids (EP, 2017)
- Marble Floors (EP, 2017)
- Little Lost (EP, 2017)
- City of Love (EP, 2017)
- Starlit Summer's Eve (Noble Remix) (Single, 2018)
- Till Your Heart is Still (Parkwild Remix) (Single, 2018)
- Save My Heart (Single, 2018)
- Can you Feel My Love (Single, 2018)
- Witchcraft (Single, 2018)
- Lover's Hill (Single, 2018)
- The London Air Raids (Michael Schaewel Remix) (Single, 2019)
- Threw a Stone (Single, 2019)
- Morning Star (Single, 2019)
- Light Up (Single, 2019)
- Midnight Dance (Single, 2019)
- The Guide (feat. Dan Russo) (Single, 2019)
- The Navigator (Acoustic Version) (Single, 2020)
- Sangre De Cristo (with Davide Rossi) (Single, 2020)
- Forward (Single 2020)
- The Sweetest Words (Single, 2020)
- Orchards (Single, 2020)
- My Bonaparte (Single 2020)
- Keep Me Warm (with Juniper Vale and Ben Laver) (Single, 2020)
- Shining Down (Single, 2021)
- Feel My Love (with Juniper Vale) (Single, 2021)
- The Rule of Life (Single, 2021)
- Can You Feel My Love? (Acoustic Version) (With Juniper Vale and Erika Ishii)
- Vian Izak: After Hours (with Ben Laver) (EP, 2021)
- When I Fall (Single, 2021)
- Decades (with Juniper Vale) (Single, 2022)
- Song I Believe In (with Davide Rossi) (Single, 2022)
- Who Am I (Without You) (Single, 2022)
- Tear it Down (Single, 2022)
- Carry it Down (US Version) (with Who's Amy and Max Abrams) (Single, 2022)
- Letting Go (Single, 2022)
- Berlin Sunrise (Single, 2022)
- New Year '89 (Single, 2022)
- You Are Not Alone In This (Single, 2022)
- Let the Old Fall Away (Single, 2023)

=== Live releases ===
- The Astronaut - Live 2017 (Single, 2018)
- Sangre De Cristo (Live in Nashville) (Single, 2021)
- Mostly (Live in Nashville) (Single, 2021)
- Vian Izak Live 2021 (EP, 2021)

=== Production, songwriting, and engineering credits ===
Year	Song(s)	Artist	Album	Role
2016	All	Keith & Kristyn Getty	Facing a Task Unfinished	Editing Engineer
2016	Auld Lang Syne	Captain Dipper & The Strawberry Girl	Auld Lang Syne	Producer, Primary Artist
2016	Heroes, L-O-V-E	Captain Dipper & The Strawberry Girl	Heroes	Producer, Primary Artist
2016	Song of the Revolution, War Against Ourselves, Porcelain Skin, Wind in the Willows, Black Forest Wedding	Captain Dipper & The Strawberry Girl	Love: A Revolution	Producer, Primary Artist
2016	Now (I Want to Move)	Captain Dipper & The Strawberry Girl	Now (I Want to Move)	Producer, Primary Artist
2016	All	The Arcadian Wild	The Arcadian Wild	Producer, Engineer, Mastering Engineer
2016	The Last Time	Juniper Vale	The Last Time	Producer, Engineer, Composer
2016	Wolves of the Revolution	The Arcadian Wild	Wolves of the Revolution	Producer, Engineer, Composer
2017	Fractions	Juniper Vale	Fractions	Producer, Engineer, Composer
2017	The Last Time (I the AI Remix)	Juniper Vale	The Last Time Remixes	Producer, Composer
2017	Envy Green	The Arcadian Wild	Envy Green	Producer, Engineer
2017	Fractions Acoustic	Juniper Vale	Fractions Acoustic	Producer, Engineer, Composer
2017	Will I Find My Home (feat. Vian Izak)	Juniper Vale	Will I Find My Home	Producer, Featured Artist
2017	Willow	The Arcadian Wild	Willow	Producer, Engineer
2017	Singing in the Rain	Juniper Vale	Singing in the Rain	Producer, Engineer
2017	Unchangeable Love	Juniper Vale	Unchangeable Love	Producer, Engineer, Composer
2017	All	Juniper Vale	Fractions Remixes	Composer
2017	The Storm	The Arcadian Wild	The Storm	Producer, Engineer
2017	All	St. Dawn in Slumber	My Heart Awakened in a Dream	Producer, Engineer
2017	Bird Song	Juniper Vale	Bird Song	Producer, Composer
2017	All	POLR	For the Fatherless	Mastering Engineer
2017	All	St. Dawn in Slumber	when soft you held aloft a light	Mastering Engineer, Engineer
2018	All	POLR	Break of Dawn	Mastering
2018	The Poet, Millstatt	The Arcadian Wild	Look Around	Producer, Engineer
2018	All	POLR	Into the Night	Mastering
2018	Fractions (I the AI Remix)	Juniper Vale	Everything is Color	Producer, Engineer, Writer
2018	Lost	Jeremy Ravine	Lost	Producer, Engineer, Writer
2018	Save My Heart	Ben Laver	Save My Heart	Producer, Mixing, Vocals, Composer, Featured Artist
2018	Mirror Mirror	Juniper Vale	Mirror Mirror	Producer, Mixing, Writer
2018	Bester Fehler	Who's Amy	Bester Fehler	Composer
2018	Bester Fehler	Who's Amy	Bester Fehler	Composer
2018	I'm not Alone	Jeremy Ravine	I'm Not Alone	Composer, Mixing, Producing
2018	Don't Hold Back	Paden	Don't Hold Back	Mixing, Producing
2018	Sail On	Paden	Sail On	Mixing, Producing
2018	Have Yourself a Merry Little Christmas (Re-Imagined)	Juniper Vale	Have Yourself a Merry Little Christmas (Re-Imagined)	Mixing, Producing
2018	For the Lost and alone Christmas is Hope	Jeremy Ravine	For the Lost and alone Christmas is Hope	Mixing, Producing
2018	Christmas Chorus	Paden	Christmas Chorus	Mixing, Producing, Composer
2019	Songbird	Paden	Songbird	Mixing, Producing
2019	Jeremy Ravine	Jeremy Ravine	Don't Let Go	Mixing, Producing, Composer
2019	Juniper Vale	Juniper Vale	The Expanse	Mixing, Producing, Composer
2019	Paden	Paden	Northern Wind	Mixing, Producing
2019	Paden	Paden	Ghost of You	Mixing, Producing, Composer
2019	POLR	POLR	Greenhouse	Mastering
2019	Paden	Paden	Have I Found My Home	Mixing, Producing
2019	POLR	POLR	Row House	Mastering
2019	POLR	POLR	Pond	Mastering
2019	POLR	POLR	Park	Mastering
2019	Jeremy Ravine	Jeremy Ravine	Breathe	Mixing, Producing
2019	Dan Russo	Dan Russo	Gameboy	Mixing, Producing, Composer
2019	Hannah Schaefer	Hannah Schaefer, Dan Russo	Safe House	Composer, Co-Producing
2019	Paden	Paden	Stories	Mixing, Producing

== Chart positions ==
Rank Date	Rank	Peak	Song	Platform	Chart	Country
June 7, 2020	10	10	Threw a Stone	Apple Music	Singer Songwriter	Panama
March 20, 2020	122	41	Call the Nightingale	iTunes	Alternative	Italy
March 20, 2020	123	42	As You Healed / The Guide	iTunes	Alternative	Italy
March 20, 2020	124	43	The Navigator	iTunes	Alternative	Italy
July 12, 2019	187	187	Mostly	iTunes	Singer Songwriter	Canada
February 16, 2019	51	28	Revolver	iTunes	Pop	Brazil
February 16, 2019	91	75	Revolver	iTunes	All Genres	Brazil
May 14, 2018	19	14	Revolver (I the AI Remix)	iTunes	Dance	New Zealand
April 12, 2018	149	149	Revolver	iTunes	Pop	Switzerland
May 10, 2017	107	107	Revolver	iTunes	Singer Songwriter	Australia
April 29, 2017	47	47	The Astronaut (Acoustic Version)	Spotify	Most Viral	Ireland
December 16, 2016	36	36	Revolver	iTunes	Singer Songwriter	Mexico

== Awards ==
Year	Nominee / work	Award	Result
2018	Vian Izak - Starlit Summer's Eve	Independent Music Award for Best AC Song	Nominated
2019	Vian Izak - Northern Anthems	Independent Music Award for Best AC Album	Nominated
