= Yuval Ben-Itzhak =

Israeli businessman

- יובל בן-יצחק
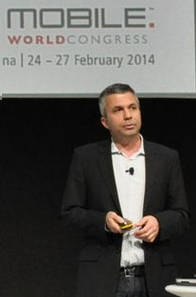
- Keynote at the 2014 Mobile World Congress
- Born: Israel
- Education: Ben-Gurion University of the Negev, B.Sc Information systems, Management & Industrial Engineering (Cum Laude)
- Occupation: Partner at Evolution Equity

Yuval Ben-Itzhak (Hebrew: יובל בן-יצחק) is an executive and entrepreneur. He received a number of honors and public recognition for his work as a chief technology officer throughout his career. Ben-Itzhak has been selected as the 25 most influencing CTO by InfoWorld, 40 Innovative IT People To Watch by Computerworld, and 2017 Chief Technology Officer of the Year by GeekTime. He was the Chief Technology Officer at AVG and was part of the leadership team that took AVG through its initial public offering on the New York Stock Exchange in 2012. He was the Chief Technology Officer at Outbrain until 2017, and led the acquisition of Socialbakers by Astute in 2020 as the Chief Executive Officer. Ben-Itzhak is known as the inventor of the Web application firewall (WAF) as part of Kavado, a company he founded in 2000. Yuval is the inventor of 26 US patents. He currently resides in Prague, Czech Republic.

== Career ==
- 2023–Today: General Partner, Evolution Equity Partners
- 2017–2020: Chief Executive Officer, Socialbakers
- 2015–2017: Chief Technology Officer, Outbrain
- 2009–2015: Chief Technology Officer, AVG Technologies (NYSE: AVG)
- 2005–2009: Chief Technology Officer, Finjan, Inc.
- 2000–2004: Chief Technology Officer, Founder, KaVaDo Inc.
- 1998–2000: Chief Technology Officer, Ness Technologies (Nasdaq: NSTC)
- 1994–1996: Software development & management, Intel (Nasdaq: INTC)
- 1988–1992: Intelligence services, IDF

== Awards ==
- 2017 – Chief Technology Officer of the Year by GeekTime
- 2007 – 40 Innovative IT People To Watch by Computerworld
- 2004 – Top 25 Most Influential CTOs by InfoWorld
