= Gălăuțaș =

- Commune
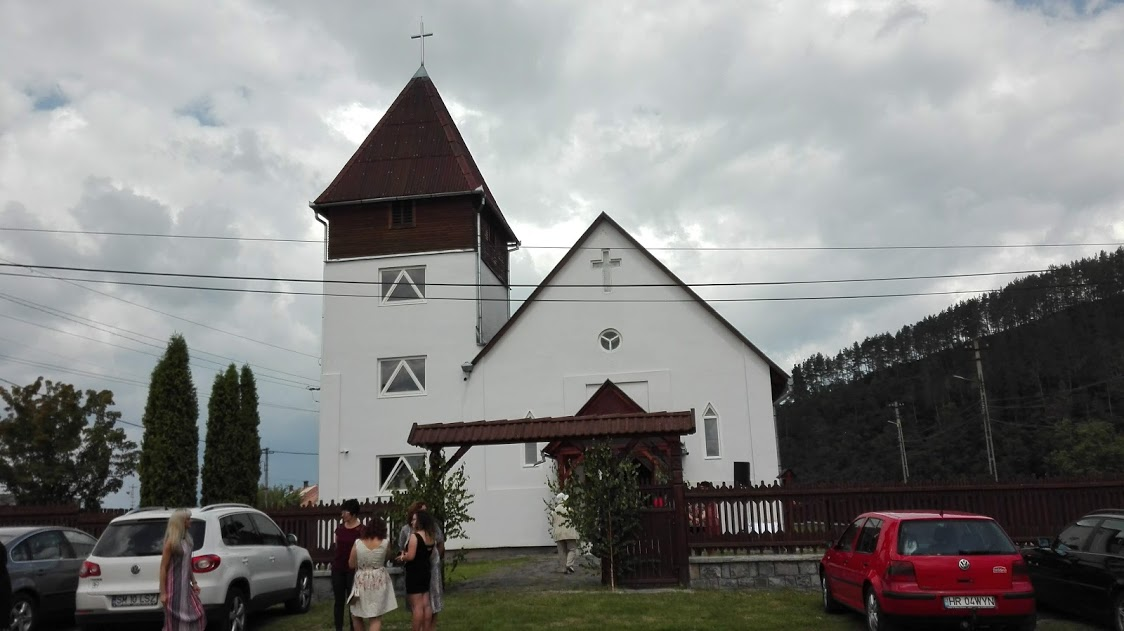
- Catholic church in Gălăuțaș village

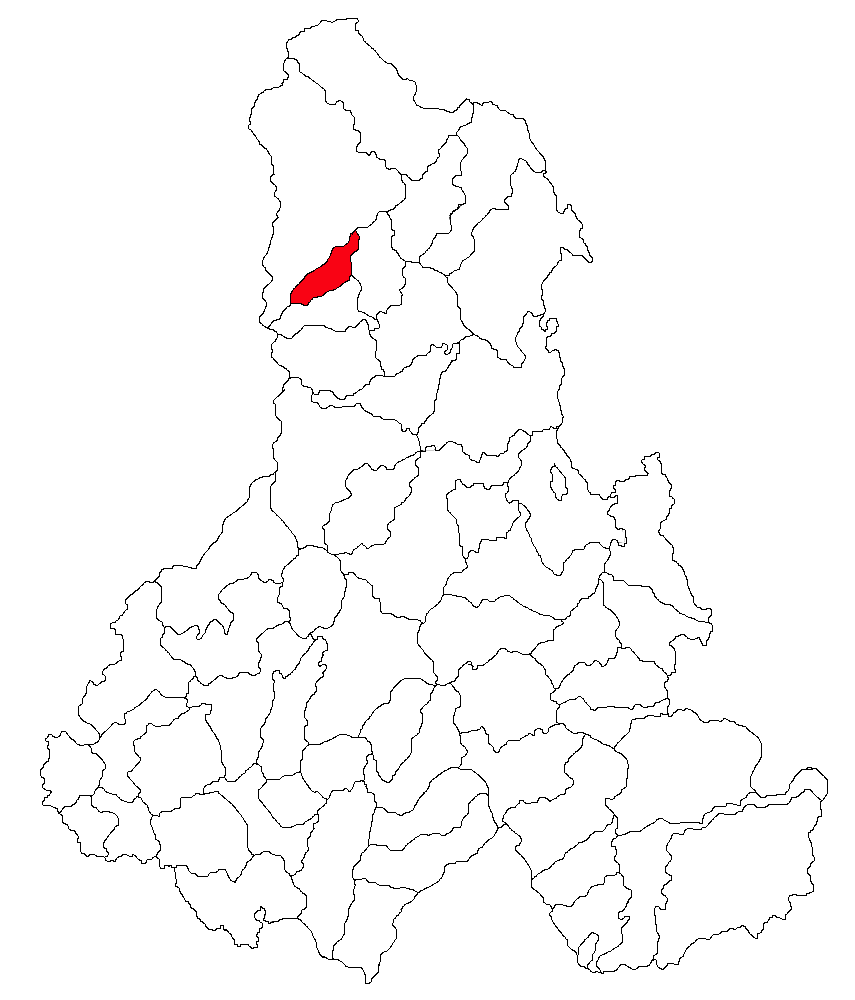
- Location in Harghita County

- Location in Romania
- Coordinates: 46°55′N 25°26′E
- Country: Romania
- County: Harghita

Government
  - Mayor (2020–2024): Radu Țăran (PSD)
- Area: 29.43 km^{2} (11.36 sq mi)
- Elevation: 695 m (2,280 ft)
- Population (2021-12-01): 2,039
  - Density: 69.28/km^{2} (179.4/sq mi)
- Time zone: UTC+02:00 (EET)
  - Summer (DST): UTC+03:00 (EEST)
- Postal code: 537120
- Area code: +(40) x66
- Vehicle reg.: HR
- Website: www.primariagalautas.ro

Gălăuțaș (Hungarian: Galócás) is a commune in Harghita County, Transylvania, Romania. It is composed of eight villages: Dealu Armanului (Ármándombja), Gălăuțaș, Gălăuțaș-Pârău (Galócáspatak), Nuțeni (Nucén), Plopiș (Ploptyis), Preluca (Preluka), Toleșeni (Tolésén), and Zăpodea (Zapodéa).

At the 2011 census, the commune had a population of 2,498; out of them, 76.14% were Romanians, 20.18% were Hungarians, and 1.12% were Roma. At the 2021 census, Gălăuțaș had 2,039 inhabitants; of those, 72.14% were Romanians, 19.96% Hungarians, and 1.23% Roma.

== Natives ==
- Márton Izsák (1913–2004), sculptor
