= Isaacs (surname) =

Isaacs is a surname. Notable people with the surname include:

- Alick Isaacs (1921–1967), Scottish virologist
- Avrom Isaacs, Canadian art dealer
- Bertha Isaacs, Bahamian tennis player and women's rights activist
- Betty Isaacs, (1894–1971), New Zealand sculptor and textile designer
- Charles Edward Isaacs (1811–1860), American anatomist and physiologist
- David Isaacs (writer), American screenwriter
- Don Isaacs (1919–1998), American sound editor
- Emma Isaacs, Australian entrepreneur
- Erwin Isaacs, South African football player
- George Isaacs, English politician and trade unionist
- Gregory Isaacs, Jamaican reggae musician
- Ike Isaacs (1923–1981), American jazz bassist
- Ike Isaacs (1919–1996), Burmese-British jazz guitarist
- Iorrie Isaacs, Wales rugby player
- Isaac Isaacs, Australian politician, jurist and Governor-General
- Jason Isaacs, English actor
- Jeremy Isaacs, Scottish television producer and executive
- John Isaacs, African-American basketball player
- John Dove Isaacs, American oceanic scientist
- Jorge Isaacs, Colombian writer, politician and soldier
- Kendal Isaacs, Bahamian politician and Leader of the Opposition
- Levi Isaacs (1860–1913), Australian tobacconist and Jewish lay leader
- Lewis Henry Isaacs, English architect, surveyor, and politician
- Mark Isaacs, Australian composer and pianist
- Martin Isaacs (1940–2025), American mathematician
- Nathaniel Isaacs, English adventurer
- Pamela Isaacs, American actress and singer
- Rufus Isaacs, 1st Marquess of Reading, English politician and jurist
- Rufus Isaacs (game theorist), American mathematician
- Sam Isaacs, Australian Aboriginal stockman
- Samuel Myer Isaacs, American educator
- Sonya Isaacs, American country singer
- Stan Isaacs, American sportswriter
- Susan Isaacs, American novelist and screenwriter
- Susan Sutherland Isaacs, English educational psychologist and psychoanalyst
- Susie Isaacs, American poker player

== Fictional characters ==
- Jeff Isaacs, from Degrassi: The Next Generation
- Doctor Sam Isaacs, from Resident Evil (film series)
- Toby Isaacs, from Degrassi: The Next Generation
- Melanie Isaacs from Disgrace
