= Itzik Ben-Itzhak =

Itzik Ben-Itzhak (born February 15, 1952) is a university distinguished professor of physics at Kansas State University. Ben-Itzhak is the director of Kansas State University's James R. Macdonald Laboratory and studies experimental atomic physics, molecular physics, and optical physics.

== Early life and education ==
Ben-Itzhak was born in Jerusalem, Israel. He attended the Technion-Israel Institute of Technology, where he earned his Bachelor of Science in physics in 1974, his Master of Science in physics in 1981, and his doctorate in physics in 1986.

After earning his doctorate, Ben-Itzhak came to Kansas State University as a research associate in the James R. Macdonald Laboratory. The laboratory is in the department of physics and includes 15 graduate faculty members in atomic physics, molecular physics, and optical physics.

== Career ==
Ben-Itzhak became a Kansas State University assistant professor of physics in 1988, an associate professor of physics in 1994 and a professor in 2000. He became director of the James R. Macdonald Laboratory in 2007 and was named a university distinguished professor in 2012.

Ben-Itzhak's research focuses on the interaction of intense ultrashort laser pulses with molecular ions, with the long-term goal of gaining sufficient understanding of these processes so that they may be controlled at the quantum mechanical level. He also studies the physics of atomic and molecular collisions.

Ben-Itzhak's work is carried out in Kansas State University's James R. Macdonald Laboratory, of which he is also the director. The laboratory is supported, in large part, by $2.5 million each year from the United States Department of Energy. In July 2012, Ben-Itzhak oversaw the installation of a major new laser system funded by a separate $1.3 million United States Department of Energy grant.

Ben-Itzhak's collaborative research has recently provided clear experimental and theoretical evidence for the dissociation of hydrogen molecular ions seemingly without absorbing any photons from the strong laser field. The knowledge allows the research team to control this process by changing the laser-pulse bandwidth or by chirping the pulse — that is, increasing or decreasing the laser frequency with time during the pulse.

Ben-Itzhak has received collaborative funding from the National Science Foundation and the United States-Israel Binational Science Foundation. He has given nearly 50 invited talks at conferences and departments across the globe, and he has written more than 140 articles in journals, conference proceedings, and books. Ben-Itzhak currently advises seven graduate students and one postdoctoral fellow. He has mentored five graduate students and five postdoctoral fellows in the past. Undergraduate students working with him have been particularly prolific and have co-authored more than 63 articles.

== Awards and honors ==
Ben-Itzhak is a member and fellow of the American Physical Society. He received the Rosi and Max Varon Visiting Professorship at the Weizmann Institute of Science in 2003. He received the Kansas State University Schwenk Teaching Award in 2000.

== Personal life ==
Ben-Itzhak is married to Svetla Ben-Itzhak, who is Assistant Professor of Space and International Relations with the West Space Scholars Program at Johns Hopkins University in Washington DC. They have two children: Shai and Joshua.

Ben-Itzhak also is known for many years of competitive model airplane flying. He was a member of the Israeli free-flight team and participated in six European championships and 12 world championships between 1974 and 2005 with rubber powered model airplanes. His top finishes were sixth in the European championship in 1982, sixth in the world championship in 1981, and ninth place in the world championship in 2003. He won the world championship held in Taft, California, in 1979.
