= Customer experience system =

Business and operational support system

A customer experience system is a business and operational support system (BSS/OSS) intended to help service providers to improve customer experience.

In the past, communications service providers (wired communication, Wireless, broadband cable, satellite) and other companies competed through product differentiation and price points. By 2005 products were increasingly commoditized and price differences negligible, leaving quality of customer service as the differentiator. (Peppers & Rogers 2005)

Customer experience systems are part of service providers' strategies to address this change, as products and prices become increasingly similar. These systems power the front and back office (BSS/OSS) and integrate billing, customer relationship management (CRM), ordering, self service, digital content delivery, service fulfillment and assurance, and computer network planning. (Musico 2008) Software companies that sell these applications, including customer care and billing vendors, and increasingly network equipment providers, can be considered providers of customer experience systems when their offerings are appropriately integrated.

== Customer opinion ==
A 2006 Bain and Company report found that 80 percent of executives believed their company delivered a superior customer experience, but only eight percent of customers said they received one. (Bain 2006) Business Week's Jeneanne Rae says, "Building great consumer experiences is a complex enterprise, involving strategy, integration of technology, orchestrating business models, brand management and CEO commitment." (Rae 2006)
