= List of awards and nominations received by Sơn Tùng M-TP =

Sơn Tùng M-TP awards and nominations
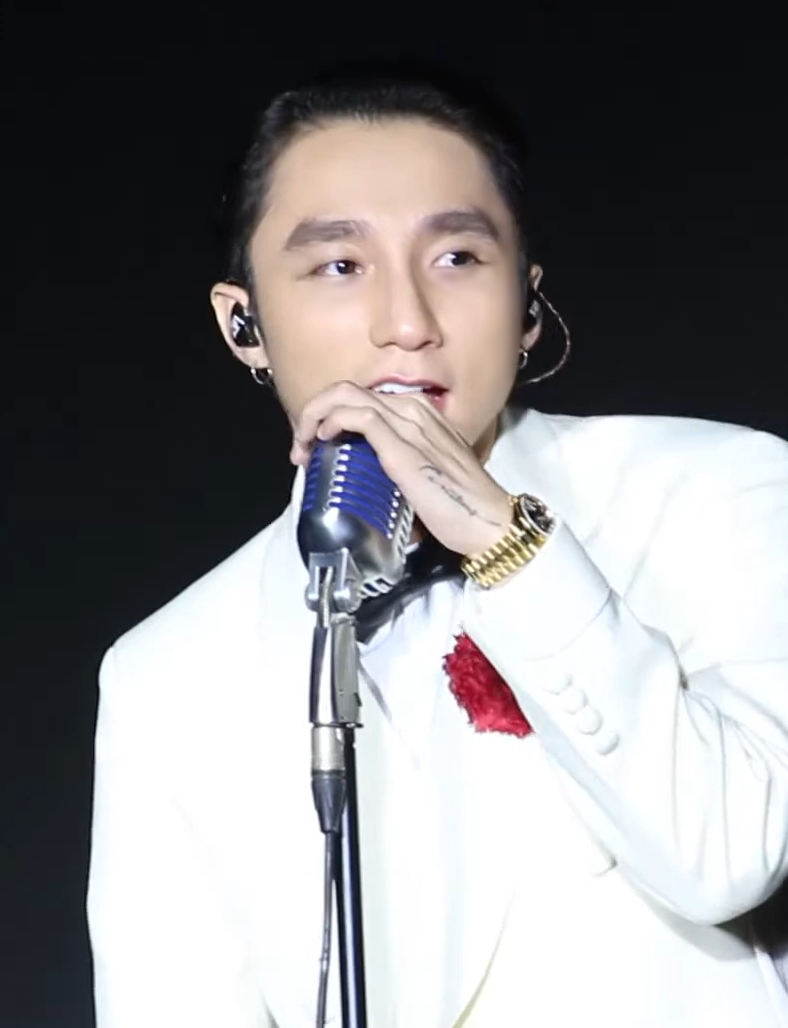
Awards and nominations (Note: Awards in certain categories do not have prior nominations and only winners are announced by the jury. For simplification and to avoid errors, each award in this list has been presumed to have had a prior nomination.) (Note: The years in the table indicate the year in which the awards show took place. If the 2012 edition of an awards show takes place in 2013, the table will indicate the latter year.)
Awards	Wins	Nominations
Big Apple Music Awards	1	1
Dedication Music Awards	1	13
Elle Style Awards (Vietnam)	1	2
Favorite Song	2	2
Golden Kite Prizes	1	1
Golden Ochna Awards	0	4
Green Wave Awards	11	22
I-Magazine Fashion Face Awards	0	1
Keeng Young Awards	2	4
Men of the Year	1	1
Mnet Asian Music Awards	1	1
MTV Europe Music Awards	1	2
Ngôi sao của năm	1	1
Nhân vật truyền lửa	1	1
SBS PopAsia Awards	1	1
The Magic Box	1	1
V Live Awards	1	1
VTV Awards	0	3
WebTVAsia Awards	1	1
WeChoice Awards	12	18
Zing Music Awards	6	16
Awards won	48
Nominations	101

Vietnamese singer-songwriter Sơn Tùng M-TP began his career as an independent artist online before finding success with "Cơn mưa ngang qua", his debut single released in 2012. It was Tùng's 2013 single, "Em của ngày hôm qua", that helped him to reach mainstream status. Both songs earned him the monthly honors from music chart television program Favorite Song. "Cơn mưa ngang qua" also received a Zing Music Award for R&B Song of the Year. In 2014, he was disqualified from Favorite Song and Green Wave Award nominations due to accusations of plagiarism toward many of his songs' instrumental tracks.

The singer later turned to acting in the feature film Dandelion (2014), a role which gave him a respected Golden Kite Prize for Young Prominent Actor. The film's soundtrack, "Chắc ai đó sẽ về", and his other single "Âm thầm bên em", respectively won a WeChoice Award for Song of the Year and a Green Wave Award for Single of the Year. At the 2015 MTV Europe Music Awards, Tùng won Best Southeast Asian Act and received Best Asian Act nomination. The three following years saw him win a prestigious Dedication Music Award for Artist of the Year in 2016, a Mnet Asian Music Award for Vietnamese Breakout Artist in 2017, another Green Wave Award for Single of the Year (for his song "Lạc trôi") and a WeChoice Award for Breakout Artist in 2018.

Since 2015, Tùng has been included on the Green Wave Awards' top five Most Favorite Singers (Top Hit board) list on three consecutive occasions. (Note: The 18th Green Wave Awards ceremony was held on December 18, 2015, but the 19th edition was held on January 3, 2017.) WeChoice Awards named him one of their five Inspiration Ambassadors in 2015 and one of the ten Most Influential People of 2014 and 2017. Forbes Vietnam also included Tùng in their 2018 edition of 30 Under 30 list. In addition to music and film recognition, he was given a 2017 Vietnamese Elle Style Award for Most Stylish Male Singer. Other international awards he has received are a Big Apple Music Award and a WebTVAsia Award.

== Awards and nominations ==
Award	Year (Note: Indicates the year of ceremony.)	Category	Recipient(s)	Result	Ref.
Big Apple Music Awards	2016	Best Vietnamese Male Artist	Sơn Tùng M-TP	Won	
Dedication Music Awards	2016	Singer of the Year	Sơn Tùng M-TP	Won	
Dedication Music Awards	2016	Song of the Year	"Âm thầm bên em"	Nominated	
Dedication Music Awards	2016	Concert of the Year	M-TP Ambition - Chuyến bay đầu tiên	Nominated	
Dedication Music Awards	2016	Music Video of the Year	"Buông đôi tay nhau ra"	Nominated	
Dedication Music Awards	2018	Music Video of the Year	"Lạc trôi"	Nominated	
Dedication Music Awards	2019	Music Video of the Year	"Chạy ngay đi"	Nominated	
Dedication Music Awards	2020	Singer of the Year	Sơn Tùng M-TP	Nominated	
Dedication Music Awards	2020	Song of the Year	"Hãy trao cho anh"	Nominated	
Dedication Music Awards	2020	Music Video of the Year	"Hãy trao cho anh"	Nominated	
Dedication Music Awards	2020	Concert of the Year	Sky Tour	Nominated	
Dedication Music Awards	2025	Male Singer of the Year	Sơn Tùng M-TP	Nominated	
Dedication Music Awards	2025	Song of the Year	"Đừng làm trái tim anh đau"	Nominated	
Dedication Music Awards	2025	Music Video of the Year	"Đừng làm trái tim anh đau"	Nominated	
Elle Style Awards (Vietnam)	2016	Most Stylish Male Singer	Sơn Tùng M-TP	Nominated	
Elle Style Awards (Vietnam)	2017	Most Stylish Male Singer	Sơn Tùng M-TP	Won	
Elle Style Awards (Vietnam)	2018	Most Stylish Male Singer	Sơn Tùng M-TP	Won	
Favorite Song	2012	Song of the Month (October)	"Cơn mưa ngang qua"	Won	
Favorite Song	2014	Song of the Month (February)	"Em của ngày hôm qua"	Won	
Golden Kite Prize	2015	Young Prominent Actor	Dandelion	Won (Note: Tied with Nguyễn Bình An for Lạc giới and Ngọc Thanh Tâm for Hiệp sĩ mù.)	
Golden Ochna Awards (Note: The Golden Ochna Awards is a Vietnamese award show presented by Người Lao Động newspaper, which honors the year's biggest achievements in music, film, television, and theatre.)	2016	Pop Male Singer	"Âm thầm bên em"	Nominated	
Golden Ochna Awards	2017	Pop Male Singer	"Chúng ta không thuộc về nhau"	Nominated	
Golden Ochna Awards	2018	Pop Male Singer	"Lạc trôi"	Nominated	
Golden Ochna Awards	2018	Music Video	"Lạc trôi"	Nominated	
Green Wave Awards	2015	Top 5 Most Favorite Singers – Top Hit	Sơn Tùng M-TP	Won (Note: This award was given to Sơn Tùng M-TP for being one of the category's top recipients, no specific ranking is ever mentioned.)	
Green Wave Awards	2015	Top 10 Songwriters that have the Most Favorite Song	Sơn Tùng M-TP	Won	
Green Wave Awards	2015	Single of the Year	"Âm thầm bên em"	Won	
Green Wave Awards	2017	Top 5 Most Favorite Singers – Top Hit	Sơn Tùng M-TP	Won	
Green Wave Awards	2018	Top 5 Most Favorite Singers – Top Hit	Sơn Tùng M-TP	Won	
Green Wave Awards	2018	Top 10 Most Favorite Songs (Songwriters)	"Lạc trôi"	Won	
Green Wave Awards	2018	Single of the Year	"Lạc trôi"	Won	
Green Wave Awards	2018	Sensational Song	"Lạc trôi"	Nominated	
Green Wave Awards	2018	Most Excellent Production and Mix	"Lạc trôi"	Nominated (Note: Shared with Triple D.)	
Green Wave Awards	2019	Male Singer of the Year	Sơn Tùng M-TP	Won	
Green Wave Awards	2019	Top 10 Most Favorite Songs	"Chạy ngay đi"	Won	
Green Wave Awards	2019	Single of the Year	"Chạy ngay đi"	Nominated	
Green Wave Awards	2019	Sensational Song	"Chạy ngay đi"	Nominated	
Green Wave Awards	2019	Top 10 Most Favorite Singers	Sơn Tùng M-TP	Nominated	
Green Wave Awards	2020	Top 10 Most Favorite Songs	"Hãy trao cho anh"	Won	
Green Wave Awards	2020	Single of the Year	"Hãy trao cho anh"	Nominated	
Green Wave Awards	2020	Music Video of the Year	"Hãy trao cho anh"	Nominated	
Green Wave Awards	2020	Male Singer of the Year	Sơn Tùng M-TP	Nominated	
Green Wave Awards	2021	Top 10 Most Favorite Songs	"Có chắc yêu là đây"	Won	
Green Wave Awards	2021	Single of the Year	"Có chắc yêu là đây"	Nominated	
Green Wave Awards	2021	Music Video of the Year	"Có chắc yêu là đây"	Nominated	
Green Wave Awards	2021	Male Singer of the Year	Sơn Tùng M-TP	Nominated	
I-Magazine Fashion Face Awards (Note: The I-Magazine Fashion Face Awards are presented by I-Magazine and Behance to award the best faces in fashion.)	2016	Asian Male	Sơn Tùng M-TP (as Nguyen Thanh Tung)	32nd	
Keeng Young Awards (Note: Established in 2017 by music streaming website Keeng and music on hold service Imuzik, the Keeng Young Awards recognize musicians under thirty for their achievements in the industry.)	2017	Most Excellent Artist	Sơn Tùng M-TP	Nominated	
Keeng Young Awards	2017	Most Favorite Male Artist	Sơn Tùng M-TP	Won	
Keeng Young Awards	2017	Top 5 Most Favorite On-Hold Music Songs	"Lạc trôi"	Won	
Keeng Young Awards	2017	Best Dance Track	"Lạc trôi (Remix)" (featuring TripleD)	Nominated	
Men of the Year	2015	Team of the Year	Sơn Tùng M-TP	Won (Note: Shared with Quang Huy, Hứa Vĩ Văn, Phạm Quỳnh Anh, Ngô Kiến Huy and Hari Won.)	
Mnet Asian Music Awards	2017	Vietnamese Breakout Artist with Close-Up	Sơn Tùng M-TP	Won	
MTV Europe Music Awards	2015	Best Southeast Asian Act	Sơn Tùng M-TP	Won	
MTV Europe Music Awards	2015	Best Asian Act	Sơn Tùng M-TP	Nominated	
Ngôi sao của năm (Star of the Year)	2014	Handsome Man of the Year	Sơn Tùng M-TP	Won	
Nhân vật truyền lửa (Inspirational Person)	2017	Culture and Entertainment	Sơn Tùng M-TP	Won	
SBS PopAsia Awards	2017	Best Solo Star	Sơn Tùng M-TP	Nominated	
The Magic Box	2015	Best Male Singer	Sơn Tùng M-TP	Won	
V Live Awards	2018	Best V Star	Sơn Tùng M-TP	Won	
VTV Awards	2016	Most Impressive Singer	Sơn Tùng M-TP	Nominated	
VTV Awards	2017	Most Impressive Singer	Sơn Tùng M-TP	Nominated	
VTV Awards	2019	Most Impressive Singer	Sơn Tùng M-TP	Nominated	
WebTVAsia Awards	2016	Most Popular Video in Vietnam	"Chúng ta không thuộc về nhau"	Won	
WeChoice Awards
WeChoice Awards	2015	Top 5 Inspiration Ambassadors voted by the Appraisal Board	Sơn Tùng M-TP	Won	
WeChoice Awards	2015	Top 10 Most Influential People of 2014	Sơn Tùng M-TP	Won	
WeChoice Awards	2015	Young Male Artist of the Year	Sơn Tùng M-TP	Nominated	
WeChoice Awards	2015	Collaboration of the Year	Sơn Tùng M-TP and SlimV	Won	
WeChoice Awards	2015	Song of the Year	"Chắc ai đó sẽ về"	Won	
WeChoice Awards	2016	Top 5 Most Influential Artists of 2015	Sơn Tùng M-TP	Won	
WeChoice Awards	2016	Inspirational Playlist	"Âm thầm bên em"	Won	
WeChoice Awards	2016	Inspirational Playlist	"Không phải dạng vừa đâu"	Won	
WeChoice Awards	2016	Inspirational Playlist	"Thái Bình mồ hôi rơi"	Nominated	
WeChoice Awards	2016	Inspirational Playlist	"Chắc ai đó sẽ về"	Nominated	
WeChoice Awards	2017	Viral Word or Catchphrase of the Year	"Mình thích thì mình làm thôi"	Won	
WeChoice Awards	2017	Viral Word or Catchphrase of the Year	"Tha thu"	Nominated	
WeChoice Awards	2018	Top 10 Most Influential People of 2017	Sơn Tùng M-TP	Won	
WeChoice Awards	2018	Breakout Artist	Sơn Tùng M-TP	Won	
WeChoice Awards	2018	Most Favorite Music Video	"Lạc trôi"	Won	
WeChoice Awards	2018	Most Favorite Album	m-tp M-TP	Nominated	
WeChoice Awards	2019	Music Video of the Year	"Chạy ngay đi"	Won	
WeChoice Awards	2021	Music Video of the Year	"Chúng ta của hiện tại"	Won	
WeChoice Awards	2025	Music Video of the Year	"Đừng làm trái tim anh đau"	Nominated	
WeChoice Awards	2025	Breakout Singer/ Rapper	Sơn Tùng M-TP	Nominated	
Zing Music Awards	2013	R&B Song of the Year	"Cơn mưa ngang qua"	Won	
Zing Music Awards	2014	Most Favorite Soul/R&B Song	"Nắng ấm xa dần"	Nominated	
Zing Music Awards	2015	New Artist of the Year	Sơn Tùng M-TP	Nominated	
Zing Music Awards	2015	Most Favorite Male Artist	Sơn Tùng M-TP	Nominated	
Zing Music Awards	2016	Artist of the Year	Sơn Tùng M-TP	Nominated	
Zing Music Awards	2016	Most Favorite Male Artist	Sơn Tùng M-TP	Won	
Zing Music Awards	2018	Artist of the Year	Sơn Tùng M-TP	Nominated	
Zing Music Awards	2018	Most Favorite Male Artist	Sơn Tùng M-TP	Won	
Zing Music Awards	2018	Song of the Year	"Lạc trôi"	Nominated	
Zing Music Awards	2018	Music Video of the Year	"Lạc trôi"	Nominated	
Zing Music Awards	2018	Most Favorite Dance/Electronic Song	"Lạc trôi"	Nominated	
Zing Music Awards	2018	Most Favorite Pop/Ballad Song	"Nơi này có anh"	Nominated	
Zing Music Awards	2018	Most Favorite Rap/Hip-hop Song	"Remember Me (SlimV 2017 Mix)"	Nominated	
Zing Music Awards	2019	Music Video of the Year	"Chạy ngay đi"	Won	
Zing Music Awards	2019	Most Favorite Dance/Electronic Song	"Chạy ngay đi"	Won	
Zing Music Awards	2019	Most Favorite Male Artist	Sơn Tùng M-TP	Won	
