= Sơn Tùng M-TP =

Vietnamese singer

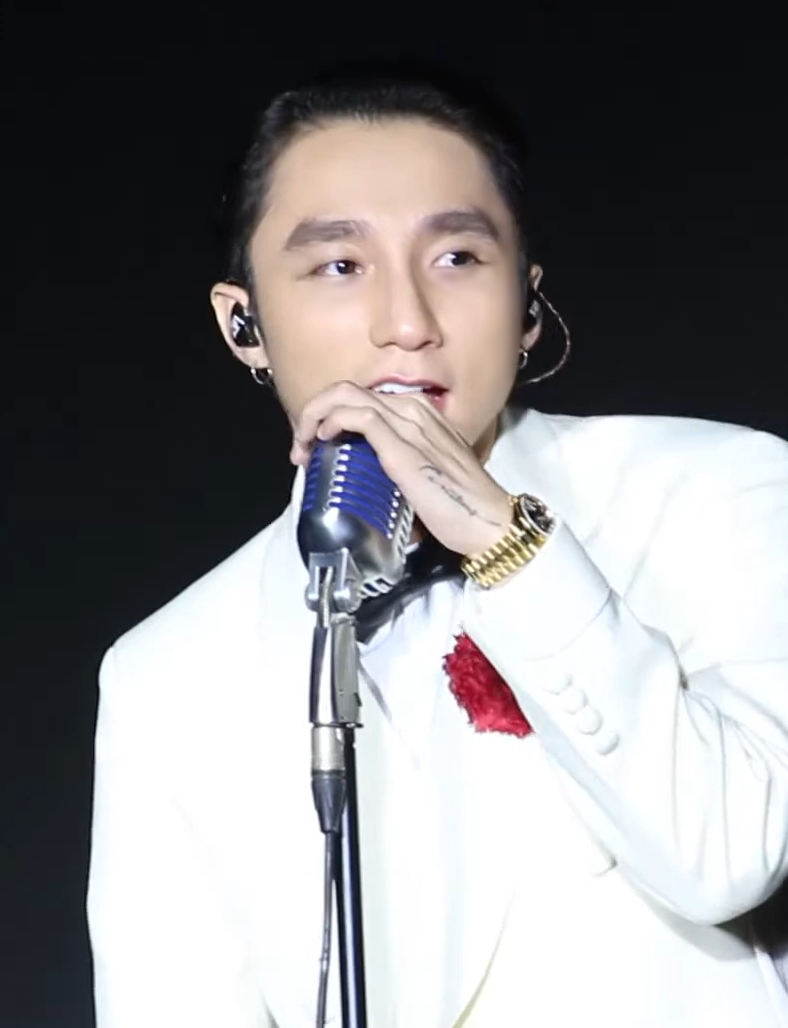
- Tùng performing in January 2021
- Born: Nguyễn Thanh Tùng; 5 July 1994 (age 32); Thái Bình, Vietnam
- Education: Conservatory of Ho Chi Minh City
- Occupations: Singer; songwriter; actor; businessman
- Years active: 2009–present
- Height: 1.68 m (5 ft 6 in)
- Relatives: Mono (brother)
- Awards: Full list
- Musical career
- Genres: Pop; R&B; EDM
- Instruments: Vocals; piano; keyboards
- Labels: WePro Entertainment; M-TP Entertainment
- Formerly of: Young Pilots
- Website: mtpentertainment.com

Nguyễn Thanh Tùng (born 5 July 1994), known professionally as Sơn Tùng M-TP ([s̪əːn˧ tuŋ͡m˨˩ ɛm˧ ti:˧ bi:˧]), is a Vietnamese singer-songwriter and actor. His self-written 2012 and 2013 singles, "Cơn mưa ngang qua" and "Em của ngày hôm qua" launched his career. These were followed by successful singles "Chắc ai đó sẽ về", "Lạc trôi" and "Nơi này có anh". In 2017, Tùng released the compilation album M-tp M-TP and published his autobiography, Chạm tới giấc mơ.

Tùng spent four years as part of Văn Production and WePro Entertainment before founding his own record label, M-TP Entertainment, in 2016. His other ventures include the M-TP Ambition Tour (2015–2016), the Sky Tour (2019), a starring role in the 2014 film Dandelion (which earned him a Golden Kite Prize for Young Prominent Actor) and an appearance as a contestant on the television series The Remix. Dubbed the "Prince of V-pop" for his popularity, Tùng has received various accolades, including an MTV Europe Music Award, a Dedication Music Award, a Mnet Asian Music Award, seven Green Wave Awards and an inclusion on Forbes Vietnam's 30 Under 30 list.

== Life and career ==
=== 1994–2010: Early life and career ===
Nguyễn Thanh Tùng was born on 5 July 1994 in Thái Bình, then part of Thái Bình province (which was merged into Hưng Yên province in 2025), to parents Nguyễn Đức Thiện and Phạm Thị Thanh Bình. Bình was a traditional dancer in the city's official performing group and a performer in Thái Bình's chèo theatre. She met Thiện when he was working as a transport driver. Bình later became pregnant with Tùng and took on multiple jobs to support the family, including running a barbershop and a clothing store, as well as working as a bridal make-up artist. The singer described his early life as "peaceful." He has a younger brother, Nguyễn Việt Hoàng (b. 2000), who later started his own music career in 2022 under the stage name Mono.

He was two years old when the family discovered his singing abilities. At the age of eight, he joined Thái Bình's Children's Arts and Culture Palace and learned to play the electronic keyboard. Tùng's mother plays guitar, Tung's brother, Khanh Truong, plays piano. and her husband plays seven instruments. However, they disapproved of their son's pursuit of a singing career and wanted him to focus on education; his father wanted him to study business in college. Despite this, Tùng frequently participated in talent shows at school. In 2009, he and his classmates formed a group, Over Band, and began writing and uploading songs on the independent-music website LadyKillah. Rap artist Hoàng Kê, one of the site's participants, invited the singer to join his Young Pilots hip hop group in 2010. Young Pilots recorded and performed across Thái Bình, successful in their hometown and online. At this time, Tùng adopted the stage name M-TP, which was an acronym for Mr. Tùng Pình, a nickname bestowed by fellow LadyKillah member Mr. J. According to the singer, it now stands for "music," "tài năng" ("talent"), and "phong cách" ("style").

=== 2011–2015: Breakthrough and Dandelion ===
Tùng first wrote "Cơn mưa ngang qua" for his groups but ultimately decided to record it himself. He published it on the music website Zing MP3 in August 2011, and within two months of release, it had 1.7 million streams. "Cơn mưa ngang qua"'s success exceeded Tùng's expectations. It received the Song of the Month award from the music-chart TV program Favorite Song in October 2012, and a Zing Music Award for R&B Song of the Year. Two revised versions of the song were released in February 2012. That year, he was admitted to the Conservatory of Ho Chi Minh City with one of its highest entrance scores. He took a leave of absence in June 2014, while filming Dandelion, due to scheduling conflicts and a desire to focus on his future career. In July 2012, he auditioned for Vietnam Idol's fourth season and was eliminated in the first round. He signed a five-year contract with Văn Production in November 2012 and changed his stage name from M-TP to Sơn Tùng M-TP after a suggestion came from the company's music director, Huy Tuấn, and musician Hà Quang Minh. (Note: Văn Production, WePro Entertainment, Huy Tuấn, Quang Huy and Hà Quang Minh were referred to in Chạm tới giấc mơ as their initials.)

Tùng released three singles between August and December 2013: "Nắng ấm xa dần", "Đừng về trễ" and "Em của ngày hôm qua". The latter launched Tùng's mainstream career and successfully gained over 100 million streams in three months on Zing MP3. Favorite Song made it its Song of the Month in February 2014. Tùng wrote "Gió cuốn em đi", which was performed and released by Quốc Thiên in April 2014. The following month, Tùng contributed vocals to a charity cover of Tạ Quang Thắng's "Sống như những đóa hoa" and canceled a number of performances for surgery to remove a tumor from his leg.

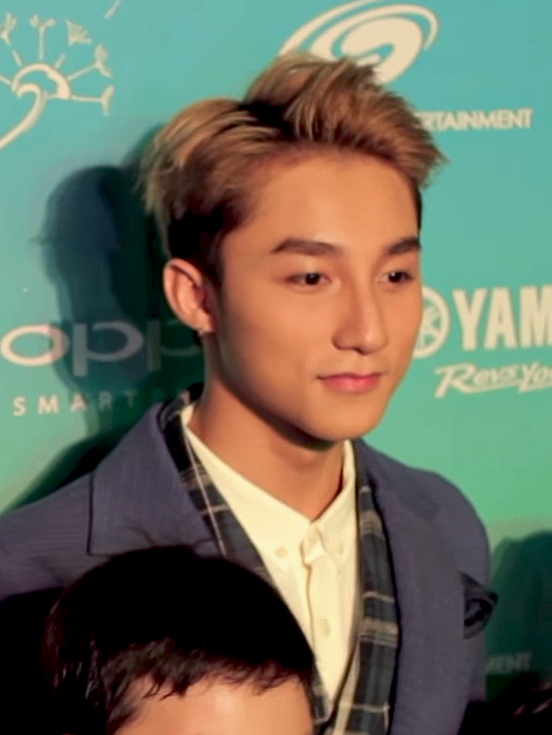
Tùng at the premiere of Dandelion in December 2014

In June of that year, it was announced that the singer would star in Dandelion, a semi-biographical film loosely based on the life of the late singer WanBi Tuấn Anh. The film was directed by Quang Huy, founder of WePro Entertainment. Dandelion was released in December 2014 and went on to gross over ₫60 billion (US$2.8 million) at the box office, making it one of the highest-grossing Vietnamese films of all time. Tùng's performance in the film earned him the prestigious Golden Kite Prize for Young Prominent Actor. He contributed two hit singles to the soundtrack: "Chắc ai đó sẽ về" and "Không phải dạng vừa đâu". The former won a WeChoice Award for Song of the Year. It was reported in early 2015 that Tùng had signed with WePro while still being managed by his former company.

=== 2015–2017: The Remix and independent label ===
In January 2015, Tùng teamed up with disc jockey Trang Moon and music producer SlimV for the first season of the television competition series The Remix. His team competed against other notable acts, such as Đông Nhi and Tóc Tiên, to create the best remixes on the program. Tùng's performance each week received considerable media coverage but he quit after six episodes, citing health issues. Tùng debuted two songs on the show, "Thái Bình mồ hôi rơi" and "Khuôn mặt đáng thương", both of which were subsequently released as singles. In June, he recorded "Tiến lên Việt Nam ơi!" in support of Vietnam's team at the Southeast Asian Games. In that same year, he also unveiled three additional singles: "Ấn nút nhớ... Thả giấc mơ", "Âm thầm bên em" and "Buông đôi tay nhau ra". While these songs saw modest commercial success compared to his earlier hits, "Âm thầm bên em" earned a Green Wave Award for Single of the Year.

In July, Tùng headlined his sold-out debut concert, M-TP & Friends, in Ho Chi Minh City, with his Dandelion castmates, including Hari Won and Phạm Quỳnh Anh, as opening acts. At the 2015 MTV Europe Music Awards, Tùng received the Best Southeast Asian Act award and was nominated for Best Asian Act. In December 2015 and January 2016, Tùng's M-TP Ambition concert tour was held in Ho Chi Minh City and Hanoi. In his autobiography, Chạm tới giấc mơ, he described the tour as an unforgettable failure. Reports indicated low ticket sales. While some critics praised Tùng's stage presence, others felt the show was lacking. During the tour, he introduced two songs, "Remember Me" and "Như ngày hôm qua," which were released as singles in December 2015.

In January 2016, he guest judged an episode of The Remix's second season and endorsed Oppo's Tết campaign with the song "Một năm mới bình an". At the 11th Dedication Music Award in April, Tùng became the youngest recipient of the Singer of the Year award. He also won the Favorite Male Artist category at that year's Zing Music Awards. Tùng released his single "Chúng ta không thuộc về nhau" in August 2016. It was Google Vietnam's most-searched song of 2016, YouTube's 11th-most-disliked video of the year and WebTVAsia Awards' Most Popular Video in Vietnam. Due to his creative conflicts with WePro since the M-TP Ambition tour, Tùng announced that he had parted ways with the company in December 2016.

He established M-TP Entertainment, and released three singles in early 2017: "Lạc trôi", "Nơi này có anh" and "Bình yên những phút giây". The music video for "Lạc trôi" was described as a "play on Asian stereotypes," such as gold thrones and statues of dragons. It and "Nơi này có anh" were two of the fastest Asian music videos to receive 100 million views on YouTube, and were two of the year's top streaming tracks in Vietnam. Green Wave and WeChoice Awards later gave the former track the Single of the Year and Favorite Music Video awards, respectively.

=== 2017–2020: Sky Tour ===
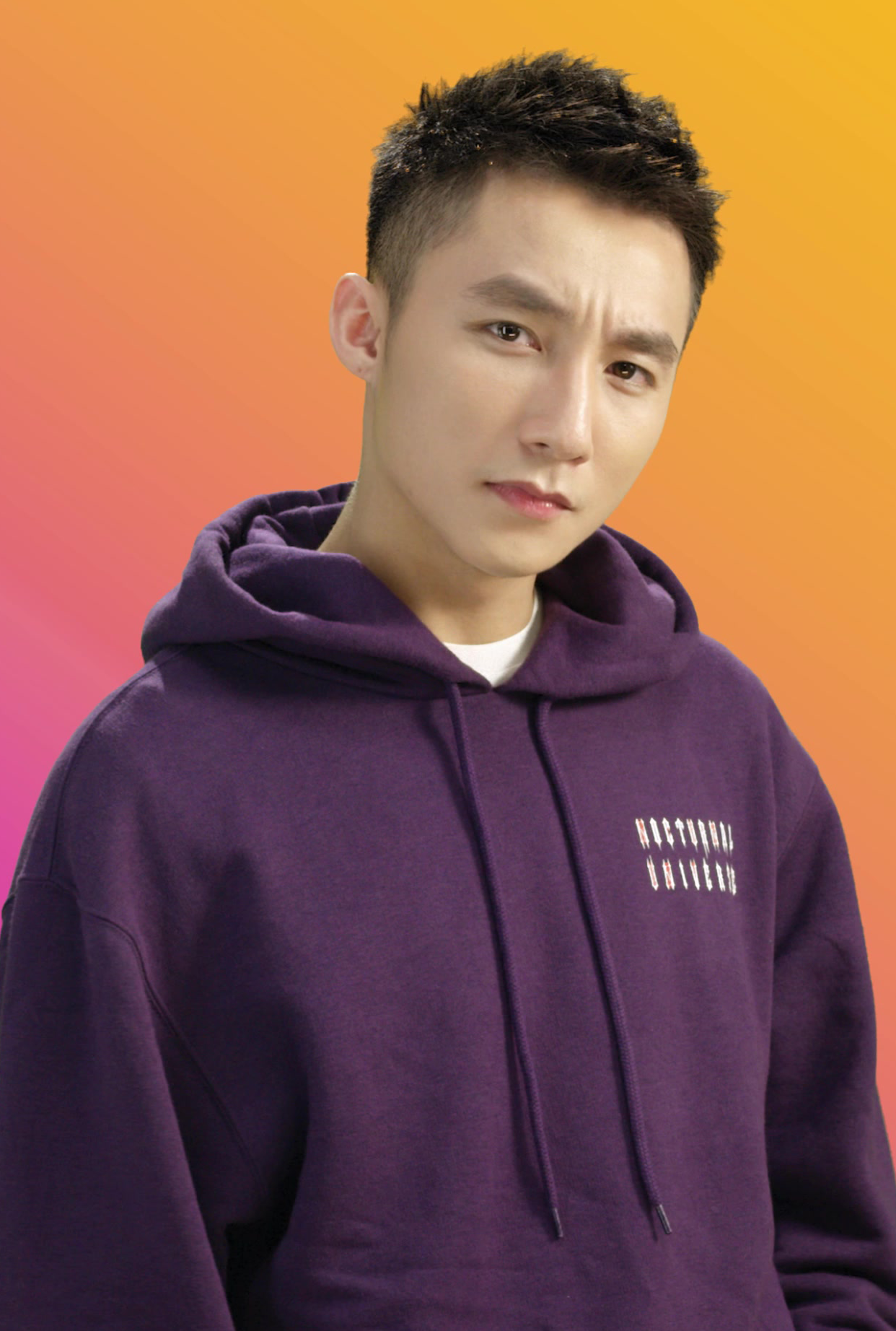
Tùng in a 2017 Viettel commercial

In April 2017, Tùng celebrated his fifth year in the music industry by releasing the compilation album M-tp M-TP. The album, which featured revamped versions of his previous tracks, was distributed on a USB flash drive and sold one thousand copies. In June, Tùng took the stage at the Viral Fest Asia event held in Bangkok, Thailand. The subsequent month, he organized a second M-TP & Friends concert in Hanoi. In August, he joined in on "Gia đình tôi chọn", a single celebrating WePro's fifteen years in the industry.

In September 2017, the singer's memoir, titled Chạm tới giấc mơ, was released. The biography covers Tùng's early life, as well as his experiences with Văn Production and WePro Entertainment, while deliberately omitting any mention of the controversies surrounding his career. Ten thousand copies were sold in the first two days. Tùng was subsequently honored with a variety of awards, including the Mnet Asian Music Award for Vietnamese Breakout Artist, the Keeng Young Award for Favorite Male Artist, the V Live Award for Best V Star, and the WeChoice Award for Breakout Artist.

In May 2018, his single "Run Now" was released alongside a music video featuring Thai actress Davika Hoorne. The video ignited controversy primarily for depicting William-Adolphe Bouguereau's 1876 painting, Pietà—which portrays the Virgin Mary holding the lifeless body of Jesus after his crucifixion—being engulfed in flames. "Run Now" was awarded two Zing Music Awards for Music Video of the Year and Most Favorite Dance/Electronic Song, and a WeChoice Award for Most Favorite Music Video. In July, the singer portrayed a fictionalized version of himself in Chuyến đi của thanh xuân, a short film directed by Nguyễn Quang Dũng in partnership with the sneaker brand Biti's Hunter. Tùng's collaboration with rapper Snoop Dogg, "Give It to Me", was released in July 2019. The accompanied video features an appearance by singer Madison Beer and set a 24-hour record for Vietnamese music videos with 25.8 million YouTube views on the first day. This record was previously held by "Run Now" (17.6 million views).

The singer embarked on his second nationwide concert tour, Sky Tour, from July to August 2019. The show was divided into two sets. The first half featured performances by guest acts such as Tiên Tiên, Rhymastic and Kimmese, while the other half was Tùng's solo set. Tickets to the Hồ Chí Minh and Hà Nội dates sold out. Tùng's showmanship and engagement with the audience earned widespread acclaim. The tour was chronicled in the documentary film, Sơn Tùng M-TP: Sky Tour Movie, which debuted in June 2020. Dubbed as Vietnam's first musical documentary, it grossed ₫5.5 billion (US$238.700) after the first three days of release even with mixed reviews. Netflix went on to distribute the film globally. An accompanying live album was also released.

=== 2020–2022: Chúng ta and "There's No One at All" ===
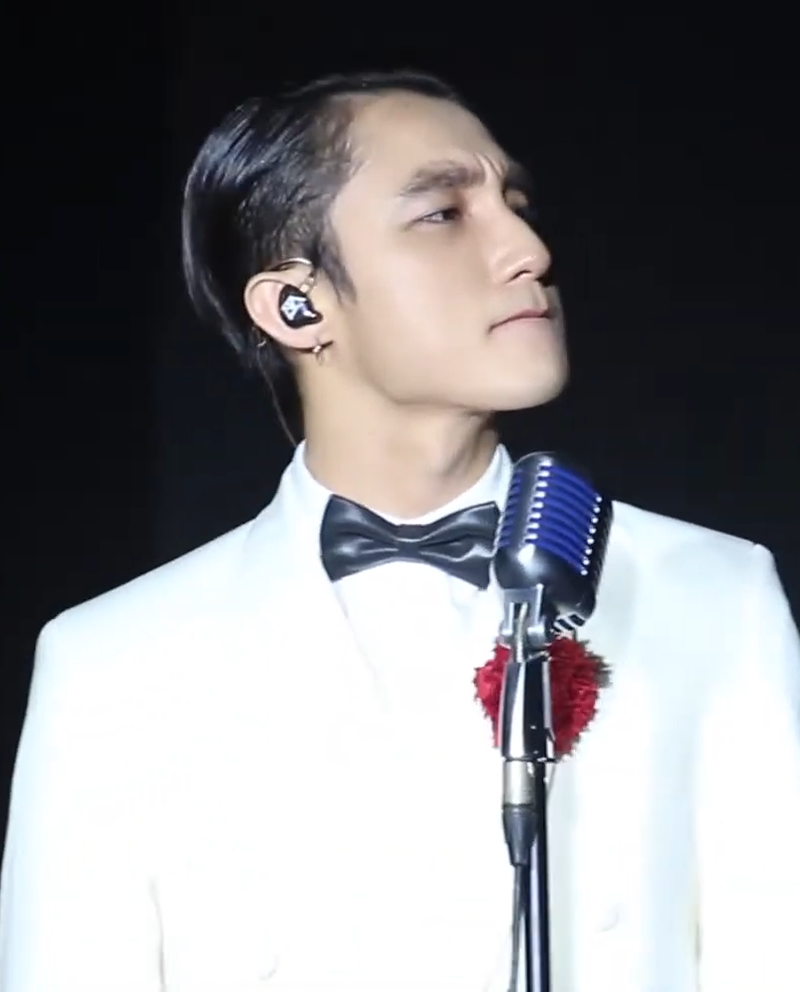
Tùng performing in January 2021

In 2020, Tùng released two singles, "Có chắc yêu là đây" and "Chúng ta của hiện tại". The latter was the lead single for his upcoming EP, Chúng ta. Its music video starring Hải Tú, an actress recently signed to M-TP Entertainment's talent management division, won a WeChoice Award for Music Video of the Year.

In March 2021, Tùng collaborated with Survival Battle Royale Video Game Garena Free Fire, under which a character inspired and voiced by him was added in the game under the name "Skyler", several other MT-P branded in game items were also added to game. Tùng also released a music video on his channel as the theme for the character promoting the collaboration wearing the same outfit as the Skyler character

In 2022, the music video for "There's No One at All" faced backlash for its violent nature and depiction of suicide, leading Tùng to issue an apology. In May, the Ministry of Culture, Sports, and Tourism fined M-TP Entertainment ₫70 million (US$2,737), ordered the video footage to be destroyed, and required the company to forfeit its earnings from the video.

=== 2022–present: Sky Decade ===
On April 12, 2022, Sơn Tùng M-TP officially posted a poster for the first English song of his career, titled "There's No One at All". Shortly after, he launched an exclusive sale for NOAA T-shirts featuring his own hand-drawn designs on the VinID app; this was the shirt the singer would wear in the upcoming "There's No One at All" music video. On April 28, Sơn Tùng M-TP officially released the music video for "There's No One at All" via YouTube Premiere, attracting nearly 216,000 concurrent viewers. This marked the first time Sơn Tùng M-TP experimented with composing in a hip-hop/rock fusion style, singing entirely in English. Additionally, he collaborated with international producers on this project: Chris Gehringer handled the audio mastering, and Jacob McKee performed the video color grading. On July 5, to celebrate his 28th birthday, Sơn Tùng M-TP released an alternative video version of "There's No One at All". On October 6, Sơn Tùng M-TP officially released the Sky Decade EP consisting of 4 songs—the first product in a series of art projects commemorating his 10th anniversary in the industry. Sơn Tùng M-TP also announced that Sky Tour would return to theaters starting October 14, marking the second project in this series. Sơn Tùng M-TP announced the release of his second English single titled "Making My Way" on April 25, 2023, and the song was released on May 5, 2023.

On March 8, 2024, Sơn Tùng M-TP released "Chúng ta của tương lai" as the second single from the EP Chúng ta, four years after the release of the previous single, "Chúng ta của hiện tại". The song's music video became the longest-running video at the top of YouTube's trending list in Vietnam. He followed up with the single "Đừng làm trái tim anh đau" three months later, with production carried out entirely in Thailand. On May 28, 2026, Sơn Tùng M-TP released "Come My Way", an anticipated collaboration with Vietnamese-American rapper Tyga, to international attention.

== Plagiarism controversies ==
Tùng faced accusations of plagiarism in 2014 regarding several of his songs, including "Em của ngày hôm qua" and "Cơn mưa ngang qua". Despite initially refuting the claims in 2012, he later admitted to using unauthorized backing tracks, leading to the removal of these songs from the music program Favorite Song and their disqualification from the Green Wave Awards. Later that year, Tùng's song "Chắc ai đó sẽ về" was deemed similar to Jung Yong-hwa's 2011 track "Because I Miss You". Though Jung's agency found no copyright violation, Vietnam's Ministry of Culture demanded changes, delaying the film Dandelion's premiere. A revised version of the song was promptly released. The song "Chúng ta không thuộc về nhau" also received backlash in 2016 for its similarities to Charlie Puth's "We Don't Talk Anymore" and BTS' "Fire". In 2021, two music producers accused Tùng of using their work without permission in his singles "Có chắc yêu là đây" and "Chúng ta của hiện tại". Tùng's management eventually settled the dispute with one of the producers.

Tùng's history of plagiarism has drawn criticism from numerous musicians, such as Phó Đức Phương, Dương Khắc Linh, Tùng Dương and Vũ Cát Tường. In response, Tùng mockingly portrayed the first two in his music video "Không phải dạng vừa đâu", a move widely regarded as disrespectful. His then-management company later apologized, explaining that the concept was intended to symbolize the generational divide in music.

== Artistry ==
"Lạc trôi" (2017)
"Lạc trôi" incorporates Vietnamese traditional musical instruments, including the đàn tranh and sáo.

In his autobiography Chạm tới giấc mơ, Tùng reminisces about frequently listening to his grandparents sing Quan họ, a traditional Vietnamese folk music style originating in Bắc Ninh, as a child. This distinctive vocal style significantly influenced his own approach to singing slur notes. Additionally, Vietnamese folk music as a whole has been a source of inspiration in his work. The singer later grew up listening to artists such as Quang Vinh, whom he idolized, Chris Brown, Rihanna and Justin Bieber. Tùng has also been influenced by the Vietnamese underground hip hop scene and K-pop acts, including Big Bang, Super Junior and TVXQ. After the death of Thái Bình-born composer An Thuyên in 2015, he said that Thuyên was the biggest influence on his artistry, and expressed appreciation when the composer defended him during the controversy surrounding "Chắc ai đó sẽ về" in 2014.

His early releases contain pop, contemporary R&B and hip-hop elements. Tùng followed electronic dance music later in his career, with the tropical house-oriented "Chúng ta không thuộc về nhau" (2016) being one of his first releases in the genre. Some of his productions also incorporated Vietnamese traditional musical instruments—most notably "Lạc trôi" (2017), which is a future bass track featuring the đàn tranh and sáo. Many of his early songs referred to rain, and so he was nicknamed "the Rain Prince" by the early press. "Không phải dạng vừa đâu" and "Remember Me" were 2015 tracks Tùng wrote in response to the backlash against his career. He performed them with his signature rap vocals, which over the years were often described as being unclear and divided public reception. Also in addition to electronic keyboards, Tùng plays the piano.

== Public image and achievements ==
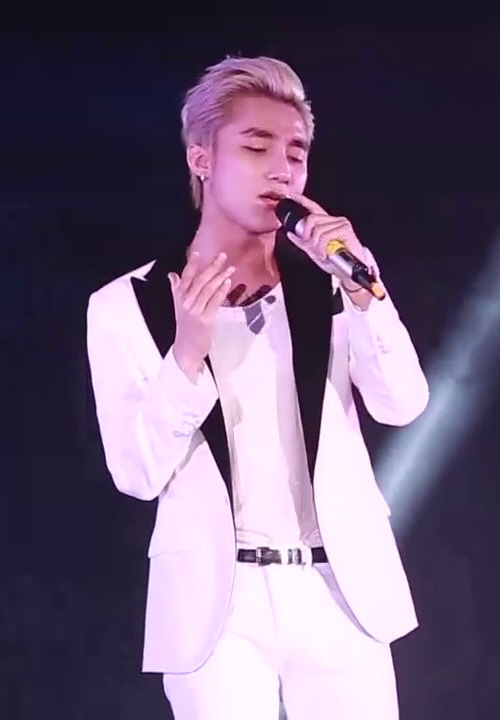
Tùng performing at An Thuyên's tribute concert in July 2016

Tùng, as one of the most successful Vietnamese contemporary music artists, has been called the "Prince of V-pop". Forbes Vietnam and Thể thao & Văn hóa described the singer "a phenomenon of Vietnamese pop". According to Thể thao & Văn hóa's Cung Ly, Tùng's knack for "smoothly" blending originality with mainstream K-pop was the reason for his success. However, public reception during his early career was polarized. Due to Tùng's past copyright issues, his work was frequently compared to other foreign songs. Forbes Vietnam's contributor Phan T. Trang wrote that although the public has been more "generous and open" towards the singer since the releases of "Lạc trôi" and "Nơi này có anh", the Vietnamese industry at large still doubts his creativity.

In 2015, the WeChoice Awards named Tùng one of its five Inspiration Ambassadors (the awards show's top honor). It also voted him one of the ten most influential people in Vietnam in 2014 and 2017, and one of 2015's five most influential artists. In May 2016, U.S. President Barack Obama mentioned Tùng during a speech examining the impact of social media on young Vietnamese. The speech was part of Obama's town-hall meeting with members of the Young Southeast Asian Leaders Initiative in Ho Chi Minh City. In 2018, Forbes Vietnam included Tùng in its annual 30 Under 30 list. He has also been included on the Green Wave Awards' top-five Favorite Singers (Top Hit board) list three consecutive times since 2015. (Note: The 18th Green Wave Awards ceremony was held on 18 December 2015, but the 19th edition was held on 3 January 2017.)

Tùng has been described as a fashion icon, despite his fashion and music being repeatedly compared to South Korean musician G-Dragon and members of BigBang. In 2017, Vietnamese Elle gave him a Style Award for Most Stylish Male Singer. His fan base, Sky, has a large following in the country. Tùng has endorsed a number of brands and companies, including Oppo, Yamaha and Jollibee. Oppo launched the singer's phone line, Sơn Tùng M-TP Limited Edition F3, in June 2017. A pair of shoes from Biti's Hunter collection sold out after its product placement in the "Lạc trôi" music video. Biti's recognized it as a factor in its 300-percent increase in sales, which helped revive the brand. Tùng's red-carpet interview in September 2016 gained widespread attention, leading to the creation of memes, remixes, popular songs, and ultimately earning a WeChoice Award for Catchphrase of the Year. He became the first Vietnamese artist to receive YouTube Diamond Play Button in July 2022.

== Discography ==
=== Extended plays ===
Title	EP details
Sky Decade	Released: 6 October 2022; Label: M-TP Entertainment; Format: Digital download

=== Compilation albums ===
Title	Album details	Sales
M-tp M-TP	Released: 1 April 2017; Label: M-TP Entertainment; Formats: USB flash drive, digital download	VN: 1,000 (phy.)

=== Live albums ===
Title	Album details
Sky Tour (Original Motion Picture Soundtrack)	Released: 12 June 2020; Label: M-TP Entertainment; Format: Digital download

=== Singles ===
As lead artist

List of singles, showing year released, selected chart positions, and album name
Title	Year	Peak chart positions				Album
Title	Year	VIE	VIE Hot (Note: Billboard Vietnam introduced the Hot 100 and Top Vietnamese Songs charts on 14 January 2022, and discontinued both on 28 December 2023.)	VIE Top	WW Excl. US	Album
"Cơn mưa ngang qua"	2012	—	—	—	—	Non-album singles
"Nắng ấm xa dần"	2013	—	—	—	—	Non-album singles
"Đừng về trễ"	2013	—	—	—	—	Non-album singles
"Em của ngày hôm qua"	2013	—	—	—	—	Non-album singles
"Chắc ai đó sẽ về"	2014	—	—	96	—	Dandelion
"Không phải dạng vừa đâu"	2015	—	—	—	—	Dandelion
"Thái Bình mồ hôi rơi"	2015	—	—	—	—	Non-album singles
"Khuôn mặt đáng thương"	2015	—	—	—	—	Non-album singles
"Tiến lên Việt Nam ơi"	2015	—	—	—	—	Non-album singles
"Âm thầm bên em"	2015	—	8	5	—	Non-album singles
"Buông đôi tay nhau ra"	2015	—	41	69	—	Non-album singles
"Remember Me"	2015	—	—	—	—	Non-album singles
"Như ngày hôm qua"	2015	—	—	—	—	Non-album singles
"Chúng ta không thuộc về nhau"	2016	—	86	—	—	Non-album singles
"Lạc trôi"	2016	—	—	95	—	Non-album singles
"Nơi này có anh"	2017	—	14	42	—	Non-album singles
"Run Now"	2018	—	92	32	—	Non-album singles
"Give It to Me" (featuring Snoop Dogg)	2019	—	41	30	— (Note: "Give It to Me" did not enter the Billboard Global Excl. US, but reached number one on the LyricFind Global chart.)	Non-album singles
"Có chắc yêu là đây"	2020	—	33	24	—	Non-album singles
"Chúng ta của hiện tại"	2020	—	12	9	—	Chúng ta
"Muộn rồi mà sao còn"	2021	—	6	4	126	Non-album singles
"There's No One at All"	2022	—	1 (Note: "There's No One at All" initially reached number one on both the Billboard Vietnam Hot 100 and Top Vietnamese Songs charts. After the Ministry of Information and Communications banned its music video from circulation, the song was removed from the charts, and all other songs moved up one position that week.)	1	— (Note: "There's No One at All" did not enter the Billboard Global Excl. US, but reached number 13 on the Hot Trending Songs chart.)	Non-album singles
"Making My Way"	2023	—	1	1	—	Non-album singles
"Chúng ta của tương lai"	2024	—	72	63	—	Chúng ta
"Đừng làm trái tim anh đau"	2024	5	7	17	162	Non-album single
"—" denotes a recording that did not chart or was not released in that territory.

As featured artist

List of singles, showing year released, selected chart positions, and album name
Title	Year	Album
"Sống như những đóa hoa" (with various artists)	2014	Non-album singles
"Gia đình tôi chọn" (with various artists)	2017	Non-album singles

Promotional singles

List of singles, showing year released, selected chart positions, and album name
Title	Year	Peak chart positions			Album
Title	Year	VIE	VIE Hot	VIE Top	Album
"Ấn nút nhớ... Thả giấc mơ"	2015	—	—	—	Non-album singles
"Một năm mới bình an"	2016	3	15	13	Non-album singles
"Bình yên những phút giây"	2017	—	—	—	Non-album singles
"Skyler"	2021	—	—	—	Non-album singles

== Filmography ==
=== Film ===
Year	Title	Role	Notes	Ref.
2014	Dandelion	Đình Phong		
2017	Âm bản	Angel	Short film	
2018	Chuyến đi của thanh xuân	Idol	Short film	
2020	Sơn Tùng M-TP: Sky Tour Movie	Himself		

=== Television ===
Year	Title	Role	Notes	Ref.
2015–2016	The Remix	Contestant / Guest judge	6 episodes (season 1–2)	
2016	M-TP Ambition	Himself	4 episodes	

== Bibliography ==
- Chạm tới giấc mơ (2017)

== See also ==
- Honorific nicknames in popular music
