= Phương Mỹ Chi =

Vietnamese singer and songwriter (born 2003)

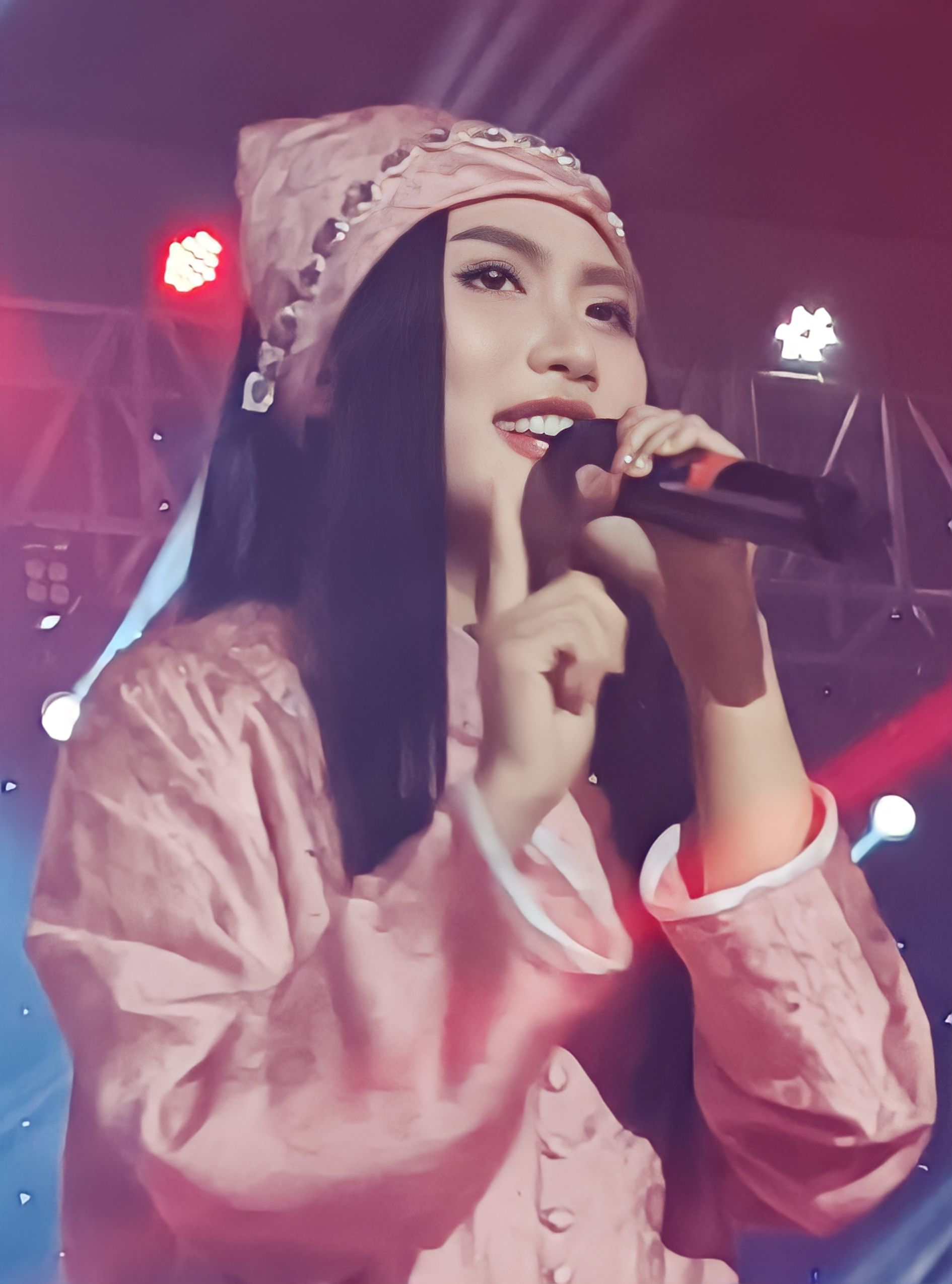
- Chi in October 2023
- Born: January 13, 2003 (age 23); Ho Chi Minh City, Vietnam
- Occupations: Singer; Songwriter
- Awards: List
- Musical career
- Genres: Vietnamese folk music; V-pop; EDM; Folktronica
- Years active: 2013–
- Label: V-MAS
- Website: Phương Mỹ Chi

Phương Mỹ Chi (Note: In this Vietnamese name, the surname is Phương. In accordance with Vietnamese custom, this person should be referred to by the given name, Chi.) (born January 13, 2003) is a Vietnamese singer-songwriter.

== Life and career ==
=== Early life ===
Chi was born on January 13, 2003, in Ho Chi Minh City. In Chi's family, Quế Như (her aunt, referred to as "Cô Út") was a singer and gave up singing because of illness. Như was the first person to recognize Chi's singing ability. Since she didn't know music theory, she taught Chi to sing folk songs using her natural instincts and personal feelings. Chi joined the school's performance team since second grade.

=== 2013: Competed in The Voice Kids Vietnam ===
Chi joined the show The Voice Kids Vietnam based on her sister's suggestion. In the Blind Auditions round, she impressed people with the song "Quê em mùa nước lũ" (lit. 'My hometown in flood season') and was chosen by all the coaches. Chi performed folk songs and sentimental songs in the next rounds, including "Đất phương Nam", "Lòng mẹ", "Áo mới Cà Mau", "Sa mưa giông" and "Nhớ mẹ lý mồ côi". At the end of this show, she became the runner-up.

After The Voice Kids, Chi acted in a 2014 Tết comedy film called "Hai Lúa" and sang in events. On October 14, 2013, Quang Lê announced that Chi's family agreed to sign a two-year exclusive contract with his company. He adopted Chi and hired a private vocal teacher for her.

=== 2014–2019: A child singer ===
On March 2, 2014, Chi participated in the March Favorite Song live show with the song "Quê em mùa nước lũ". The song won Favorite Song of the Month five times and became Favorite Song of 2014.

On June 15, 2014, Chi's debut studio album, Quê em mùa nước lũ, was officially released. The album was made by Quang Lê's company and includes 10 songs, including 3 completely new songs: "Chị đi tìm em", "Hành trình trên đất phù sa" and "Về dưới mái nhà". Eight months later, Chi released a music video for the song "Quê em mùa nước lũ". At the end of 2015, she joined the second season of Gương mặt thân quen nhí, the Vietnamese kids version of Your Face Sounds Familiar. Chi entered the final and won fourth place.

In 2017, Chi released her second studio album Thương về miền Trung. She held her first live show to sing the songs in this album. In September 2019, Chi released the self-produced extended play 16 xuân trăng.

At the end of 2019, Chi left Quang Lê Entertainment after 6 years.

=== 2020–2022: Bát nhã thuyền, Bolero lâu phai and Chi? ===
On May 1, 2020, Chi released a Buddhist music album titled Bát nhã thuyền, including Vietnamese songs, Chinese songs with Vietnamese lyrics and a Sanskrit song. In the TV show The Heroes 2021, she and Erik performed the rap song "Nam quốc sơn hà" composed by DTAP, Hành Or and RTee based on the poem "Nam quốc sơn hà". The song attracted millions of views on YouTube, TikTok. In November and December 2021, Chi released the extended play Bolero lâu phai, which included 4 bolero songs remixed in lo-fi style. In 2022, she released the extended play Chi? which features semi-classical and pop music songs. Chi is still remembered as a "folk girl".

=== 2023–: Vũ trụ cò bay ===
On April 26, 2023, Chi released the lead single for her fourth studio album, along with the music video "Vũ trụ có anh", in collaboration with Pháo and DTAP. In the video, she plays the role of a modern-day Tấm, independent of outside help. This song reached No. 24 on Billboard Vietnam Hot 100. On June 21, the album's second single "Đẩy xe bò" was released. The song is inspired by the work "Vợ nhặt", a short story by writer Kim Lân.

Chi's fourth studio album, Vũ trụ cò bay, was officially released on September 18, 2023. It includes 10 folktronica-style songs, inspired by Vietnamese literary works. The song "Bóng phù hoa" in the album reached number 7 on Billboard Vietnam Hot 100. Chi won the "New Singer of the Year" category at the 2023 Green Wave Awards and receive some nominations at the Dedication Awards and Yellow Mai Awards. In August 2024, the deluxe version of this album with four new songs was published. Chi organized the school tour Vũ trụ cò bay two months later and more than 8,000 people came to watch.

At the 2024 Green Wave Awards, Chi performed two songs "Diều ngược gió" and "Wrapped miền Tây". "Diều ngược gió" is the theme song of 2024 Green Wave Awards, and "Wrapped miền Tây" is a mashup of Western region of Vietnam songs and social media trends in 2024.

In 2025, Chi joined TV show Em xinh "say hi" and won as the champion of Season 1.

== Discography ==
=== Studio albums ===
- Quê em mùa nước lũ (2014)
- Thương về miền Trung (2017)
- Bát nhã thuyền (2020)
- Vũ trụ cò bay (2023)

=== Extended plays ===
- 16 xuân trăng (2019)
- Bolero lâu phai (2021)
- Chi? (2022)

=== Singles ===
- THIÊN ĐƯỜNG VỚI NGƯỜI MÌNH THƯƠNG (2026)

== Filmography ==
=== Films ===
- Hai lúa (2014)
- Mùa hè 1999 (2021)
- Nhà gia tiên (2025)

=== Web series ===
- Nhật ký cho ba (2016)
- Tiệm hoa dì ghẻ (2022)

== Awards and nominations ==
| Award | Year | Category | Nominee(s)/work(s) | Result | Ref. |
|---|---|---|---|---|---|
| Dedication Music Awards | 2024 | Female Singer of the Year | — | Nominated | |
| Dedication Music Awards | 2024 | Album of the Year | Vũ trụ cò bay | Nominated | |
| Green Wave Awards | 2023 | New Singer of the Year | — | Won | |
| Green Wave Awards | 2023 | Female Singer of the Year | — | Nominated | |
| Green Wave Awards | 2023 | Album of the Year | Vũ trụ cò bay | Nominated | |
| Green Wave Awards | 2023 | Excellent Collaboration | Phương Mỹ Chi and DTAP | Nominated | |
| Green Wave Awards | 2023 | Music Video of the Year | "Vũ trụ có anh" | Nominated | |
| Green Wave Awards | 2023 | Arrangement | "Vũ trụ có anh" | Nominated | |
| Favorite Song | 2014 | Song of the Year | "Quê em mùa nước lũ" | Won | |
| Yellow Mai Awards | 2013 | Most Favorite Singer of Folk-Inspired and Revolutionary Traditional Music | – | Won | |
| Yellow Mai Awards | 2023 | Female Singer | Phương Mỹ Chi – song "Bóng phù hoa" | Nominated | |
