= Billboard Vietnam Hot 100 =

Vietnamese music chart

The Billboard Vietnam Hot 100 is a record chart in Vietnam for songs, compiled by Billboard Vietnam since January 2022, with a temporary suspension between January 2024 and May 2025. The chart is updated every week on Thursday (ICT) on both the Billboard Vietnam and Billboard websites.

The first number-one song on the chart was "Mang tiền về cho mẹ" (lit. 'Bring money home to mom') by Đen featuring Nguyên Thảo for the issue dated 14 January 2022.

== Methodology ==
The chart tracks songs' performance from Friday to Thursday. Chart rankings are based on digital downloads from full-service digital music retailers (sales from direct-to-consumer sites such as an individual artist's store are excluded) and online streaming occurred in Vietnam during the tracking period. All data are provided by MRC Data.

== Billboard Vietnam Top Vietnamese Songs ==
Billboard Vietnam has a separate chart called Top Vietnamese Songs. The chart utilizes the same methodology as the Vietnam Hot 100 chart, but only tracks Vietnamese-language songs.

== List of number-one songs ==
=== 2022 ===
Key
†	Indicates best-performing song of 2022

Chart history
Issue date	Billboard Vietnam Hot 100			Ref.	Billboard Vietnam Top Vietnamese Songs			Ref.
Issue date	No.	Title	Artist(s)	Ref.	No.	Title	Artist(s)	Ref.
14 January	1	"Mang tiền về cho mẹ"	Đen featuring Nguyên Thảo		1	"Mang tiền về cho mẹ"	Đen featuring Nguyên Thảo	
20 January	1	"Mang tiền về cho mẹ"	Đen featuring Nguyên Thảo		1	"Mang tiền về cho mẹ"	Đen featuring Nguyên Thảo	
27 January	1	"Mang tiền về cho mẹ"	Đen featuring Nguyên Thảo		1	"Mang tiền về cho mẹ"	Đen featuring Nguyên Thảo	
3 February	1	"Mang tiền về cho mẹ"	Đen featuring Nguyên Thảo		1	"Mang tiền về cho mẹ"	Đen featuring Nguyên Thảo	
10 February	1	"Mang tiền về cho mẹ"	Đen featuring Nguyên Thảo		1	"Mang tiền về cho mẹ"	Đen featuring Nguyên Thảo	
17 February	1	"Mang tiền về cho mẹ"	Đen featuring Nguyên Thảo		1	"Mang tiền về cho mẹ"	Đen featuring Nguyên Thảo	
24 February	2	"Stay Alive"	Jungkook		2	"Ngày đầu tiên"	Đức Phúc	
3 March	3	"Ngày đầu tiên"	Đức Phúc		2	"Ngày đầu tiên"	Đức Phúc	
10 March	3	"Ngày đầu tiên"	Đức Phúc		2	"Ngày đầu tiên"	Đức Phúc	
17 March	4	"Chìm sâu"	RPT MCK featuring Trung Trần		3	"Chìm sâu"	RPT MCK featuring Trung Trần	
24 March	4	"Chìm sâu"	RPT MCK featuring Trung Trần		3	"Chìm sâu"	RPT MCK featuring Trung Trần	
31 March	5	"Butter"	BTS		4	"Don't Break My Heart"	Binz	
7 April	6	"Chân mây"	K-ICM featuring Phương Thanh		5	"Chân mây"	K-ICM featuring Phương Thanh	
14 April	7	"Still Life"	Big Bang		re	"Chìm sâu"	RPT MCK featuring Trung Trần	
21 April	7	"Still Life"	Big Bang		6	"See tình"	Hoàng Thùy Linh	
28 April	7	"Still Life"	Big Bang		6	"See tình"	Hoàng Thùy Linh	
5 May	8	"Chơi vơi"	K-ICM featuring Trung Quân		7	"Chơi vơi"	K-ICM featuring Trung Quân	
12 May	9	"That That" (Note: The number-one song was originally "There's No One at All" by Sơn Tùng M-TP in both charts issued on 12 May 2022. Due to the content of its MV (music video), the song was banned from circulation by the Ministry of Information and Communications, and all songs placed lower were moved up one place.)	Psy featuring Suga		8	"Có em"	Madihu featuring Low G	
19 May	10	"Có em"	Madihu featuring Low G		8	"Có em"	Madihu featuring Low G	
26 May	11	"Có không giữ mất đừng tìm"	Trúc Nhân		9	"Có không giữ mất đừng tìm"	Trúc Nhân	
2 June	11	"Có không giữ mất đừng tìm"	Trúc Nhân		9	"Có không giữ mất đừng tìm"	Trúc Nhân	
9 June	12	"Ánh sao và bầu trời"	T.R.I		10	"Ánh sao và bầu trời"	T.R.I	
16 June	12	"Ánh sao và bầu trời"	T.R.I		10	"Ánh sao và bầu trời"	T.R.I	
23 June	13	"Yet to Come (The Most Beautiful Moment)"	BTS		11	"Ai muốn nghe không"	Đen	
30 June	14	"Vì mẹ anh bắt chia tay"	Miu Lê, Karik and Châu Đăng Khoa		12	"Vì mẹ anh bắt chia tay"	Miu Lê, Karik and Châu Đăng Khoa	
7 July	15	"Left and Right"	Charlie Puth featuring Jungkook		13	"Vaicaunoicokhiennguoithaydoi"	Grey D and Tlinh	
14 July	16	"Vaicaunoicokhiennguoithaydoi"	Grey D and Tlinh		13	"Vaicaunoicokhiennguoithaydoi"	Grey D and Tlinh	
21 July	17	"Bên trên tầng lầu"	Tăng Duy Tân		14	"Bên trên tầng lầu"	Tăng Duy Tân	
28 July	17	"Bên trên tầng lầu"	Tăng Duy Tân		14	"Bên trên tầng lầu"	Tăng Duy Tân	
4 August	17	"Bên trên tầng lầu"	Tăng Duy Tân		14	"Bên trên tầng lầu"	Tăng Duy Tân	
11 August	17	"Bên trên tầng lầu"	Tăng Duy Tân		14	"Bên trên tầng lầu"	Tăng Duy Tân	
18 August	18	"Vì anh đâu có biết"	Madihu featuring Vũ.		15	"Vì anh đâu có biết"	Madihu featuring Vũ.	
25 August	18	"Vì anh đâu có biết"	Madihu featuring Vũ.		15	"Vì anh đâu có biết"	Madihu featuring Vũ.	
1 September	19	"Pink Venom"	Blackpink		15	"Vì anh đâu có biết"	Madihu featuring Vũ.	
8 September	19	"Pink Venom"	Blackpink		15	"Vì anh đâu có biết"	Madihu featuring Vũ.	
15 September	19	"Pink Venom"	Blackpink		16	"Waiting for You" †	Mono and Onionn	
22 September	20	"Waiting for You" †	Mono and Onionn		16	"Waiting for You" †	Mono and Onionn	
29 September	21	"Shut Down"	Blackpink		16	"Waiting for You" †	Mono and Onionn	
6 October	re	"Waiting for You" †	Mono and Onionn		16	"Waiting for You" †	Mono and Onionn	
13 October	re	"Waiting for You" †	Mono and Onionn		16	"Waiting for You" †	Mono and Onionn	
20 October	re	"Waiting for You" †	Mono and Onionn		16	"Waiting for You" †	Mono and Onionn	
27 October	re	"Waiting for You" †	Mono and Onionn		16	"Waiting for You" †	Mono and Onionn	
3 November	re	"Waiting for You" †	Mono and Onionn		16	"Waiting for You" †	Mono and Onionn	
10 November	re	"Waiting for You" †	Mono and Onionn		16	"Waiting for You" †	Mono and Onionn	
17 November	re	"Waiting for You" †	Mono and Onionn		16	"Waiting for You" †	Mono and Onionn	
24 November	re	"Waiting for You" †	Mono and Onionn		16	"Waiting for You" †	Mono and Onionn	
1 December	re	"Waiting for You" †	Mono and Onionn		16	"Waiting for You" †	Mono and Onionn	
8 December	re	"Waiting for You" †	Mono and Onionn		16	"Waiting for You" †	Mono and Onionn	
15 December	re	"Waiting for You" †	Mono and Onionn		16	"Waiting for You" †	Mono and Onionn	
22 December	re	"Waiting for You" †	Mono and Onionn		16	"Waiting for You" †	Mono and Onionn	
29 December	22	"Ditto"	NewJeans		17	"Bo xì bo"	Hoàng Thùy Linh	

=== 2023 ===
Chart history
Issue date	Billboard Vietnam Hot 100			Ref.	Billboard Vietnam Top Vietnamese Songs			Ref.
Issue date	No.	Title	Artist(s)	Ref.	No.	Title	Artist(s)	Ref.
5 January	re	"Ditto"	NewJeans		re	"Bo xì bo"	Hoàng Thùy Linh	
12 January	re	"Ditto"	NewJeans		re	"Bo xì bo"	Hoàng Thùy Linh	
19 January	23	"OMG"	NewJeans		re	"Bo xì bo"	Hoàng Thùy Linh	
26 January	24	"Ngủ một mình"	Hieuthuhai, Negav and Kewtiie		18	"Ngủ một mình"	Hieuthuhai, Negav and Kewtiie	
2 February	25	"Bo xì bo"	Hoàng Thùy Linh		re	"Bo xì bo"	Hoàng Thùy Linh	
9 February	26	"Flowers"	Miley Cyrus		re	"Ngủ một mình"	Hieuthuhai, Negav and Kewtiie	
16 February	re	"Ngủ một mình"	Hieuthuhai, Negav and Kewtiie		re	"Ngủ một mình"	Hieuthuhai, Negav and Kewtiie	
23 February	27	"Luôn yêu đời"	Đen and Cheng		19	"Luôn yêu đời"	Đen and Cheng	
2 March	28	"Em đồng ý (I Do)"	Đức Phúc and 911		20	"Em đồng ý (I Do)"	Đức Phúc and 911	
9 March	29	"Die for You"	The Weeknd and Ariana Grande		20	"Em đồng ý (I Do)"	Đức Phúc and 911	
16 March	30	"Nếu lúc đó"	Tlinh and 2pillz		21	"Nếu lúc đó"	Tlinh and 2pillz	
23 March	30	"Nếu lúc đó"	Tlinh and 2pillz		21	"Nếu lúc đó"	Tlinh and 2pillz	
30 March	30	"Nếu lúc đó"	Tlinh and 2pillz		21	"Nếu lúc đó"	Tlinh and 2pillz	
6 April	31	"Like Crazy"	Jimin		21	"Nếu lúc đó"	Tlinh and 2pillz	
13 April	32	"Flower"	Jisoo		22	"Anh đã ổn hơn"	RPT MCK	
20 April	32	"Flower"	Jisoo		22	"Anh đã ổn hơn"	RPT MCK	
27 April	32	"Flower"	Jisoo		22	"Anh đã ổn hơn"	RPT MCK	
4 May	33	"Cupid"	Fifty Fifty		22	"Anh đã ổn hơn"	RPT MCK	
11 May	34	"Đưa em về nhàa"	Grey D and Chillies		23	"Đưa em về nhàa"	Grey D and Chillies	
18 May	35	"Making My Way"	Sơn Tùng M-TP		24	"Making My Way"	Sơn Tùng M-TP	
25 May	35	"Making My Way"	Sơn Tùng M-TP		24	"Making My Way"	Sơn Tùng M-TP	
1 June	36	"Nấu ăn cho em"	Đen and PiaLinh		25	"Nấu ăn cho em"	Đen and PiaLinh	
8 June	36	"Nấu ăn cho em"	Đen and PiaLinh		25	"Nấu ăn cho em"	Đen and PiaLinh	
15 June	36	"Nấu ăn cho em"	Đen and PiaLinh		25	"Nấu ăn cho em"	Đen and PiaLinh	
22 June	37	"Take Two"	BTS		25	"Nấu ăn cho em"	Đen and PiaLinh	
29 June	re	"Nấu ăn cho em"	Đen and PiaLinh		25	"Nấu ăn cho em"	Đen and PiaLinh	
6 July	re	"Left and Right"	Charlie Puth featuring Jungkook		25	"Nấu ăn cho em"	Đen and PiaLinh	
13 July	re	"Left and Right"	Charlie Puth featuring Jungkook		25	"Nấu ăn cho em"	Đen and PiaLinh	
20 July	re	"Left and Right"	Charlie Puth featuring Jungkook		25	"Nấu ăn cho em"	Đen and PiaLinh	
27 July	38	"Seven"	Jungkook featuring Latto		26	"À lôi"	Double2T and Masew	
3 August	38	"Seven"	Jungkook featuring Latto		26	"À lôi"	Double2T and Masew	
10 August	38	"Seven"	Jungkook featuring Latto		26	"À lôi"	Double2T and Masew	
17 August	38	"Seven"	Jungkook featuring Latto		27	"Id 072019"	W/N	
24 August	38	"Seven"	Jungkook featuring Latto		27	"Id 072019"	W/N	
31 August	38	"Seven"	Jungkook featuring Latto		27	"Id 072019"	W/N	
7 September	38	"Seven"	Jungkook featuring Latto		27	"Id 072019"	W/N	
14 September	38	"Seven"	Jungkook featuring Latto		28	"Khi cơn mơ dần phai"	Tez and Myra Trần	
21 September	38	"Seven"	Jungkook featuring Latto		28	"Khi cơn mơ dần phai"	Tez and Myra Trần	
28 September	38	"Seven"	Jungkook featuring Latto		re	"Id 072019"	W/N	
5 October	38	"Seven"	Jungkook featuring Latto		re	"Id 072019"	W/N	
12 October	38	"Seven"	Jungkook featuring Latto		29	"Lệ lưu ly"	Vũ Phụng Tiên and DT Tập Rap	
19 October	39	"You & Me"	Jennie		30	"Cắt đôi nỗi sầu"	Tăng Duy Tân	
26 October	40	"Bạn đời"	Karik and GDucky		31	"Bạn đời"	Karik and GDucky	
2 November	40	"Bạn đời"	Karik and GDucky		31	"Bạn đời"	Karik and GDucky	
9 November	41	"Từng quen"	Wren Evans and itsnk		32	"Từng quen"	Wren Evans and itsnk	
16 November	41	"Từng quen"	Wren Evans and itsnk		32	"Từng quen"	Wren Evans and itsnk	
23 November	41	"Từng quen"	Wren Evans and itsnk		32	"Từng quen"	Wren Evans and itsnk	
30 November	41	"Từng quen"	Wren Evans and itsnk		32	"Từng quen"	Wren Evans and itsnk	
7 December	41	"Từng quen"	Wren Evans and itsnk		32	"Từng quen"	Wren Evans and itsnk	
14 December	41	"Từng quen"	Wren Evans and itsnk		32	"Từng quen"	Wren Evans and itsnk	
21 December	41	"Từng quen"	Wren Evans and itsnk		32	"Từng quen"	Wren Evans and itsnk	
28 December	42	"Những lời hứa bỏ quên"	Vũ and Dear Jane		33	"Những lời hứa bỏ quên"	Vũ and Dear Jane	

=== 2025 ===
Chart history
Issue date	Billboard Vietnam Hot 100			Ref.
Issue date	No.	Title	Artist(s)	Ref.
27 May	1	"Phép màu"	Maydays and Minh Tốc & Lam	
3 June	1	"Phép màu"	Maydays and Minh Tốc & Lam	
10 June	1	"Phép màu"	Maydays and Minh Tốc & Lam	
17 June	1	"Phép màu"	Maydays and Minh Tốc & Lam	
24 June	1	"Phép màu"	Maydays and Minh Tốc & Lam	
1 July	1	"Phép màu"	Maydays and Minh Tốc & Lam	
8 July	1	"Phép màu"	Maydays and Minh Tốc & Lam	
15 July	2	"Bóng phù hoa"	Phương Mỹ Chi and DTAP	
22 July	3	"Jump"	Blackpink	
29 July	re	"Phép màu"	Maydays and Minh Tốc & Lam	
5 August	re	"Phép màu"	Maydays and Minh Tốc & Lam	
12 August	re	"Phép màu"	Maydays and Minh Tốc & Lam	
19 August	4	"Kho báu"	(S)Trong Trọng Hiếu and Rhymastic (Note: Rhymastic was credited in the 26 August Hot 100 edition and the 27 August Top Vietnamese Songs edition.)	
26 August	4	"Kho báu"	(S)Trong Trọng Hiếu and Rhymastic	
3 September	5	"Còn gì đẹp hơn"	Nguyễn Hùng	
9 September	5	"Còn gì đẹp hơn"	Nguyễn Hùng	
16 September	5	"Còn gì đẹp hơn"	Nguyễn Hùng	
23 September	5	"Còn gì đẹp hơn"	Nguyễn Hùng	
30 September	5	"Còn gì đẹp hơn"	Nguyễn Hùng	
7 October	5	"Còn gì đẹp hơn"	Nguyễn Hùng	
14 October	5	"Còn gì đẹp hơn"	Nguyễn Hùng	
21 October	5	"Còn gì đẹp hơn"	Nguyễn Hùng	
28 October	6	"Seven"	Jungkook featuring Latto	
4 November	6	"Seven"	Jungkook featuring Latto	
11 November	6	"Seven"	Jungkook featuring Latto	
18 November	6	"Seven"	Jungkook featuring Latto	
25 November	6	"Seven"	Jungkook featuring Latto	
2 December	6	"Seven"	Jungkook featuring Latto	
9 December	6	"Seven"	Jungkook featuring Latto	
16 December	6	"Seven"	Jungkook featuring Latto	
23 December	6	"Seven"	Jungkook featuring Latto	
30 December	6	"Seven"	Jungkook featuring Latto	

Chart history
Issue date	Billboard Vietnam Top Vietnamese Songs			Ref.
Issue date	No.	Title	Artist(s)	Ref.
26 June	1	"Phép màu"	Maydays and Minh Tốc & Lam	
2 July	1	"Phép màu"	Maydays and Minh Tốc & Lam	
9 July	2	"Bóng phù hoa"	Phương Mỹ Chi and DTAP	
16 July	re	"Phép màu"	Maydays and Minh Tốc & Lam	
23 July	re	"Phép màu"	Maydays and Minh Tốc & Lam	
30 July	re	"Phép màu"	Maydays and Minh Tốc & Lam	
6 August	re	"Phép màu"	Maydays and Minh Tốc & Lam	
13 August	3	"Kho báu"	(S)Trong Trọng Hiếu and Rhymastic	
20 August	3	"Kho báu"	(S)Trong Trọng Hiếu and Rhymastic	
27 August	3	"Kho báu"	(S)Trong Trọng Hiếu and Rhymastic	
4 September	4	"Còn gì đẹp hơn"	Nguyễn Hùng	
10 September	4	"Còn gì đẹp hơn"	Nguyễn Hùng	
17 September	4	"Còn gì đẹp hơn"	Nguyễn Hùng	
24 September	4	"Còn gì đẹp hơn"	Nguyễn Hùng	
1 October	4	"Còn gì đẹp hơn"	Nguyễn Hùng	
8 October	4	"Còn gì đẹp hơn"	Nguyễn Hùng	
15 October	4	"Còn gì đẹp hơn"	Nguyễn Hùng	
22 October	4	"Còn gì đẹp hơn"	Nguyễn Hùng	
29 October	4	"Còn gì đẹp hơn"	Nguyễn Hùng	
5 November	4	"Còn gì đẹp hơn"	Nguyễn Hùng	
12 November	5	"Người đầu tiên"	Juky San and Buitruonglinh	
19 November	5	"Người đầu tiên"	Juky San and Buitruonglinh	
26 November	6	"E là không thể"	Anh Quân Idol	
3 December	7	"Chẳng phải tình đầu sao đau đến thế"	Min featuring Dangrangto and Antransax	
10 December	7	"Chẳng phải tình đầu sao đau đến thế"	Min featuring Dangrangto and Antransax	
17 November	re	"E là không thể"	Anh Quân Idol	
24 December	re	"E là không thể"	Anh Quân Idol	

=== 2026 ===
Chart history
Issue date	Billboard Vietnam Hot 100			Ref.
Issue date	No.	Title	Artist(s)	Ref.
6 January	7	"Dạo này"	Obito	
13 January	re	"Seven"	Jungkook featuring Latto	
20 January	8	"Ai ngoài anh"	VSTRA featuring Tyronee	
27 January	8	"Ai ngoài anh"	VSTRA featuring Tyronee	
3 February	8	"Ai ngoài anh"	VSTRA featuring Tyronee	
10 February	8	"Ai ngoài anh"	VSTRA featuring Tyronee	
17 February	8	"Ai ngoài anh"	VSTRA featuring Tyronee	
24 February	9	"Vạn sự như ý"	Trúc Nhân	
3 March	9	"Vạn sự như ý"	Trúc Nhân	
10 March	re	"Ai ngoài anh"	VSTRA featuring Tyronee	
17 March	10	"Cảm ơn người đã thức cùng tôi"	Phùng Khánh Linh	
24 March	10	"Cảm ơn người đã thức cùng tôi"	Phùng Khánh Linh	
31 March	11	"Swim"	BTS	
7 April	11	"Swim"	BTS	
14 April	11	"Swim"	BTS	
21 April	11	"Swim"	BTS	
28 April	11	"Swim"	BTS	
5 May	re	"Seven"	Jungkook featuring Latto	
12 May	re	"Seven"	Jungkook featuring Latto	
19 May	re	"Seven"	Jungkook featuring Latto	
26 May	re	"Seven"	Jungkook featuring Latto	
2 June	re	"Seven"	Jungkook featuring Latto	
9 June	12	"Come My Way"	Sơn Tùng M-TP, Tyga	
16 June	12	"Come My Way"	Sơn Tùng M-TP, Tyga	
23 June	12	"Come My Way"	Sơn Tùng M-TP, Tyga	
30 June	13	"Em"	Binz	
7 July	14	"Tìm em" (hợp tác với Bảo Anh)	Hngle	
14 July	14	"Tìm em" (hợp tác với Bảo Anh)	Hngle	
21 July	14	"Tìm em" (hợp tác với Bảo Anh)	Hngle	
28 July	14	"Tìm em" (hợp tác với Bảo Anh)	Hngle	

Chart history
Issue date	Billboard Vietnam Top Vietnamese Songs			Ref.
Issue date	No.	Title	Artist(s)	Ref.
1 January	re	"E là không thể"	Anh Quân Idol	
7 January	8	"Dạo này"	Obito	
14 January	8	"Dạo này"	Obito	
21 January	9	"Ai ngoài anh"	VSTRA featuring Tyronee	
28 January	9	"Ai ngoài anh"	VSTRA featuring Tyronee	
4 February	9	"Ai ngoài anh"	VSTRA featuring Tyronee	
11 February	9	"Ai ngoài anh"	VSTRA featuring Tyronee	
19 February	10	"Vạn sự như ý"	Trúc Nhân	
25 February	10	"Vạn sự như ý"	Trúc Nhân	
4 March	re	"Ai ngoài anh"	VSTRA featuring Tyronee	
11 March	11	"Cảm ơn người đã thức cùng tôi"	Phùng Khánh Linh	
18 March	11	"Cảm ơn người đã thức cùng tôi"	Phùng Khánh Linh	
25 March	re	"Ai ngoài anh"	VSTRA featuring Tyronee	
1 April	12	"Từng là của nhau"	Bảo Anh, Táo	
8 April	12	"Từng là của nhau"	Bảo Anh, Táo	
15 April	12	"Từng là của nhau"	Bảo Anh, Táo	
22 April	12	"Từng là của nhau"	Bảo Anh, Táo	
29 April	12	"Từng là của nhau"	Bảo Anh, Táo	
6 May	12	"Từng là của nhau"	Bảo Anh, Táo	
13 May	12	"Từng là của nhau"	Bảo Anh, Táo	
20 May	13	"Ngày rời chuyến bay"	Minh Huy and Pinny	
27 May	13	"Ngày rời chuyến bay"	Minh Huy and Pinny	
3 June	14	"Come My Way"	Sơn Tùng M-TP, Tyga	
10 June	14	"Come My Way"	Sơn Tùng M-TP, Tyga	
17 June	14	"Come My Way"	Sơn Tùng M-TP, Tyga	
24 June	15	"Em"	Binz	
1 July	15	"Em"	Binz	
8 July	16	"Tìm em" (hợp tác với Bảo Anh)	Hngle	
15 July	16	"Tìm em" (hợp tác với Bảo Anh)	Hngle	
22 July	16	"Tìm em" (hợp tác với Bảo Anh)	Hngle	
29 July	16	"Tìm em" (hợp tác với Bảo Anh)	Hngle	

== Song milestones ==
=== Most weeks at number one ===
Weeks	Artist(s)	Song	Year(s)
25	Jungkook featuring Latto	"Seven"	2023–26
13	Mono and Onionn	"Waiting for You"	2022
10	MAYDAYs and Minh Tốc & Lam	"Phép màu"	2025
8	Nguyễn Hùng	"Còn gì đẹp hơn"	2025
7	Wren Evans and itsnk	"Từng quen"	2023
6	Đen featuring Nguyên Thảo	"Mang tiền về cho mẹ"	2022
6	VSTRA featuring Tyronee	"Ai ngoài anh"	2026

=== Most weeks at number one on the Top Vietnamese Songs ===
Weeks	Artist(s)	Song	Year(s)
15	Mono and Onionn	"Waiting for You"	2022
10	Nguyễn Hùng	"Còn gì đẹp hơn"	2025
8	Đen and PiaLinh	"Nấu ăn cho em"	2023
7	Wren Evans and itsnk	"Từng quen"	2023
7	Bảo Anh and Táo	"Từng là của nhau"	2026
6	Đen featuring Nguyên Thảo	"Mang tiền về cho mẹ"	2022
6	W/N	"Id 072019"	2023
6	MAYDAYs and Minh Tốc & Lam	"Phép màu"	2025
6	VSTRA featuring Tyronee	"Ai ngoài anh"	2026
5	Hoàng Thùy Linh	"Bo xì bo"	2022–23

== Artist achievements ==
=== Most number-one singles ===
Total songs	Artist
3	Blackpink
3	BTS
3	Đen
3	Jungkook
2	Đức Phúc
2	Grey D
2	K-ICM
2	Karik
2	Madihu
2	NewJeans

=== Most weeks at number one ===
Total weeks	Artist
17	Jungkook
13	Mono
13	Onionn
12	Latto
11	Đen
7	Wren Evans
7	itsnk
6	Nguyên Thảo
5	Blackpink
4	Tăng Duy Tân
4	NewJeans
4	PiaLinh
4	Charlie Puth

=== Most number-one singles on the Top Vietnamese Songs ===
Total songs	Artist
4	Đen
2	K-ICM
2	Madihu
2	Hoàng Thùy Linh
2	Đức Phúc
2	RPT MCK
2	Grey D
2	Tăng Duy Tân
2	Karik

=== Most weeks at number one on the Top Vietnamese Songs ===
Total weeks	Artist
16	Đen
15	Mono
15	Onionn
8	PiaLinh
7	Hoàng Thùy Linh
7	RPT MCK
7	Wren Evans
7	itsnk
6	Nguyên Thảo
6	Madihu
6	W/N
5	Đức Phúc
5	Tăng Duy Tân
5	Vũ
4	2pillz
4	Tlinh

== See also ==
- Official Vietnam Chart
