= Wanbi =

Wanbi or WanBi may refer to:

- Wanbi, South Australia
- WanBi Tuấn Anh, Vietnamese singer
