= M-tp M-TP =

m-tp M-TP

Compilation album by Sơn Tùng M-TP
- Released: April 1, 2017
- Recorded: 2011–17
- Genre: Pop; R&B; electronic dance
- Length: 74:20
- Label: M-TP Entertainment
- Producer: Sơn Tùng M-TP; Hiếu Viper; Khắc Hưng; Long Halo; Nguyễn Hà; SlimV; Triple D

Sơn Tùng M-TP chronology
Chàng trai năm ấy OST (2014)	m-tp M-TP (2017)	Sky Tour (Original Motion Picture Soundtrack) (2020)

Singles from m-tp M-TP
- 1. "Lạc trôi" Released: December 31, 2016; 2. "Nơi này có anh" Released: February 14, 2017; 3. "Remember Me (SlimV Mix)" Released: August 22, 2017

m-tp M-TP is the first compilation album by Vietnamese musician Sơn Tùng M-TP, commemorating his fifth anniversary in the music industry. A limited one thousand physical copies of the album sold out at the album signings in Ho Chi Minh City and Hanoi on April 1 and 3, 2017. The lead single from the album, "Lạc trôi", was released on December 31, 2016. The second single from the album, "Nơi này có anh" was released on February 14, 2017. "Remember Me (SlimV Mix)" was released as a single on August 22, 2017.

== Background and release ==
In late 2016, Sơn Tùng M-TP ended his two-year contract with record label WePro Entertainment and formed his own company M-TP Entertainment. On March 19, 2017, he announced the release of m-tp M-TP, the singer's first compilation album. The album was only made on a USB flash drive in lieu of a traditional compact disc. A limited one thousand copies of the album were sold at two signing events in Ho Chi Minh City and Hanoi, respectively on April 1 and 3, 2017. They sold out in an hour and a half at Ho Chi Minh signing and in a record-breaking thirty minutes at Hanoi event. In April, the album topped Australian SBS Viceland's radio show SBS PopAsia half-yearly report polls for Best Album and Best Solo Release. On August 22, the album version of "Remember Me" was released as a single, subtitled "SlimV 2017 Mix".

== Material and controversies ==
"Em của ngày hôm qua"
The song's original instrumental has been accused of plagiarizing EXID's 2013 single "Every Night". This new electronic dance music remix was produced by Long Halo.

m-tp M-TP features eighteen tracks, arranged in chronological order of their release dates from November 2011 to February 2017. Six tracks were given a new electronic dance remix treatment, but four of them were accused of having taken other songs' instrumental including: "Em của ngày hôm qua" with the instrumental of EXID's "Every Night", "Anh sai rồi" with Tomohisa Yamashita's "Loveless", "Nắng ấm xa dần" with As One's "Monologue" and "Cơn mưa ngang qua" with Namolla Family's "Sarangi Mareul Deutjianha". Sơn Tùng M-TP did confirm that he usually took random instrumental tracks on Internet while still an independent artist. "Chắc ai đó sẽ về" was later accused of plagiarizing Korean musician Jung Yong-hwa's 2011 single "Because I Miss You". Jung's representative dismissed the accusation but Vietnam's Ministry of Culture, Sports and Tourism still concluded that Sơn Tùng M-TP's song did get "influenced" by Jung's production, temporally banned it with parent movie Dandelion until a new mix was conducted. Final version created by producer Hà Nguyễn was added onto the compilation.

The remixes—except "Như ngày hôm qua" and "Remember Me"—were originally created for the M-TP Ambition tour late 2015. Long Halo, who was then working as a prominent producer at WePro Entertainment and as the tour's music director, offered the idea. Sơn Tùng M-TP was highly supportive of the proposal and re-recorded vocals for some of mixes. SlimV, who was the musician's teammate on The Remix, along with Triple D, Khắc Hưng and Hiếu Viper took charges as the album's producers. Absent from the compilation was the moderately-received 2013 single "Đừng về trễ". It had also been accused of taking Gain's "Nostalgia" instrumental track, while its vocal performance has been compared to GD & TOP's 2010 song "Baby Good Night".

== Track listing ==
All lyrics are written by Sơn Tùng M-TP.

No.	Title	Arranger(s)	Length
1.	"Cơn mưa ngang qua"	Long Halo	4:48
2.	"Anh sai rồi"	Long Halo	4:12
3.	"Nắng ấm xa dần"	Long Halo	3:08
4.	"Em của ngày hôm qua"	Long Halo	4:23
5.	"Chắc ai đó sẽ về"	Nguyễn Hà	4:22
6.	"Không phải dạng vừa đâu"	SlimV	4:07
7.	"Thái Bình mồ hôi rơi"	SlimV	5:18
8.	"Khuôn mặt đáng thương"	Long Halo	4:17
9.	"Tiến lên Việt Nam ơi"	Long Halo	3:38
10.	"Ấn nút nhớ... Thả giấc mơ"	Sơn Tùng M-TP; Hiếu Viper	4:04
11.	"Âm thầm bên em"	SlimV	4:53
12.	"Buông đôi tay nhau ra"	SlimV	3:47
13.	"Như ngày hôm qua"	Long Halo	3:42
14.	"Remember Me"	SlimV	3:21
15.	"Một năm mới bình an"	Long Halo	4:08
16.	"Chúng ta không thuộc về nhau"	Triple D	3:53
17.	"Lạc trôi"	Triple D	3:52
18.	"Nơi này có anh"	Khắc Hưng	4:20
Total length:			74:20

== Personnel ==
- Cao Bá Hưng – traditional musical instruments artist (track 15)
- Nguyễn Hà – music production (track 5)
- Hiếu Viper – music production (track 10)
- Khắc Hưng – musical arrangement, music production (track 18)
- Long Halo – music production (track 2–4, 8, 13, 15), mastering (track 18)
- SlimV – music production (track 7, 11, 12, 14)
- Sơn Tùng M-TP – lead vocals, writing (track 1–18)
- Triple D – music production (track 16, 17)
