= There's No One at All =

Single by Sơn Tùng M-TP
- Language: English
- Released: April 28, 2022
- Genre: R&B; pop; rock; hip hop
- Length: 2:52
- Label: M-TP Entertainment
- Songwriter: Nguyễn Thanh Tùng
- Producer: Sơn Tùng M-TP

Sơn Tùng M-TP singles chronology
| "Muộn rồi mà sao còn" (2021) | "There's No One at All" (2022) | "Making My Way" (2023) |

"There's No One at All" (stylized in all caps) is a song by Vietnamese singer-songwriter Sơn Tùng M-TP. It was written and produced by Sơn Tùng M-TP, mixed and mastered by American music producer Chris Gehringer. The song was released on April 28, 2022, as Sơn Tùng M-TP's comeback single following "Muộn rồi mà sao còn" (2021), and his first English-language song.

== Background and release ==
On April 9, 2022, Sơn Tùng changed his profile picture to a black-covered photo on all of his social media handles and unfollowed all of the people he followed on Instagram, raising speculation about a potential comeback single or new project.

On April 12, 2022, Sơn Tùng announced the new single's title as "There's No One at All". On April 20, he released the poster in his returning project and announced that the song would be released on April 28, 2022, at 20:00 (Indochina Time). On April 23, 2022, Sơn Tùng released the trailer for the music video on YouTube.

== Music video ==
The original music video, now withdrawn from YouTube, depicts a lonely, socially isolated orphan who jumps off of a tall building by the end of the video.

On April 29, 2022, the Vietnamese Department of Performing Arts requested for the music video for the song to be removed from YouTube due to "negative, non-educational messages with scenes of violence, chases and destruction, ending with a character committing suicide". This statement was made as a lot of teenagers had to struggle with mental problems due to COVID-19, especially there were several cases in which the teenager committed suicide, not long after the song was released. According to Phạm Cao Thái, chief inspector of the Vietnamese Ministry of Culture, Sports and Tourism, the video contained "images, actions, means of expression, and forms of performance that carry negative and inappropriate messages related to ethics, community health, and socio-psychology".

On May 6, 2022, Sơn Tùng removed the song from YouTube, and Sơn Tùng's company, M-TP Entertainment, was fined ₫70 million (US$3000) for the video, which authorities deemed as "negatively affecting communal and mental health".

A new music video was uploaded on July 4, 2022, which shows Sơn Tùng playing a piano on a beach.

== Reception ==
The music video for the song passed one million views on YouTube 22 minutes after publication, and 4,4 million views after 11 hours. On April 29, 2022, the song reached the number-one spot on YouTube Vietnam's trending tab.

== Charts ==
Weekly chart performance for "There's No One at All"
| Chart (2022) | Peak position |
|---|---|
| Vietnam (Vietnam Hot 100) (Note: "There's No One at All" originally placed at number one on both charts dated May 12, 2022. After the song was banned from circulation by the Vietnamese Ministry of Information and Communications due to controversy regarding its subject matter, all songs that placed lower were moved up by a place.) | 1 |
| Vietnam (Top Vietnamese Songs) | 1 |
