= Lạc trôi =

Single by Sơn Tùng M-TP

from the album m-tp M-TP
- Released: December 31, 2016
- Genre: Future bass
- Length: 3:53
- Label: M-TP Entertainment
- Songwriter: Sơn Tùng M-TP
- Producer: Triple D

Sơn Tùng M-TP singles chronology
| "Chúng ta không thuộc về nhau" (2016) | "Lạc trôi" (2016) | "Nơi này có anh" (2017) |

"Lạc trôi" (lit. 'Mindlessly floating' or 'Lost') is a song by the Vietnamese singer and songwriter Sơn Tùng M-TP from his first greatest hits album, M-tp M-TP (2017). Written by Tùng himself and produced by Triple D, it was first released on December 31, 2016 as the lead single from the album.

"Lạc trôi" is a combination of traditional musical instruments and future bass style. The song is considered to have no catchy chorus. The melody was also not as outstanding as his previous hits. However, this song has received enthusiastic reception from the audiences. The music video "Lạc trôi" is performed in the combination of ancient and modern styles and was filmed in Lam Dong. The highlight of this music video is that the singer puts on antique clothing while wearing modern sneakers. This is considered as the advertising tactics of Biti's – a footwear company - products. There are several cover versions, among them a Chinese version, a Japanese version, a Thai version and an English version.

During the first two days, "Lạc trôi" came in at No. 6 on the list of the most viewed videos of the week on YouTube. The music video uploaded to YouTube has so far garnered more than 100 million views after 61 days of release and has become one of Asia's most viewed music videos.

== Production and promotion ==
"Lạc trôi"
30-second sample of the song (in 0:58 to 1:28 and 2:31 to 3:01).

On December 12, 2016, Son Tung M-TP officially announced the release of his new song, "Lạc trôi" and his leaving his former management company, WePro, and started his independent career. In the midnight of December 17, 2016, Son Tung M-TP announced the 30-second teaser of the "Lạc trôi" project. Right after the announcement, the first images of this music project immediately created a wave of expectation in the internet community. Netizens have uploaded many cover photos from the official poster and it was spreading at a rapid pace.

The name "Lạc trôi" was chosen because as the singer stated, that was the only name suit the song lyrics which is about the feeling of drifting into nothingness. In addition, this phrase has also appeared in many of his previous songs as a charm.

On January 21, 2017, the copyright of the song was bought by Happy Entertainment and became the official soundtrack for the film Lục Vân Tiên: Tuyệt đỉnh Kungfu.

== Music video ==
At 00:00 (GMT + 7) January 1, 2017, the music video "Lạc trôi" was officially released on YouTube. The footage was filmed at Linh Quy Pháp Ấn Pagoda, located at Hill 45, Hamlet 4, Lộc Thành, Bảo Lâm, Lâm Đồng, about 21 km from Bảo Lộc city, under the direction of director Đinh Hà Uyên Thư.

Creating a completely different image from the previous MVs, Son Tung transformed into a protagonist with long hair dyed in smoke color. This music video has very colorful scenes and was very thoughtfully invested, with careful visual effects and post-production techniques. After the debut, there were many comments that Son Tung's image in this music video was reminiscent of the ancient characters in the Chinese swordplay, but Son Tung affirmed the image that he represented was very modern and had bold colors of Vietnam. Son Tung himself also admitted that the video had ancient style but in combination with modern elements. Talking about the image of the king in the music video, Son Tung said that he was inspired by a part of himself, a king who possesses the pinnacle of power but always wants to find true love. The king had a cold and unfriendly look but deep in his heart, he was very emotional, always looking for true love even though there were many beauties around him. In addition, modern costumes such as Biti's sneakers and turtleneck sweater became details that drew attention.

=== Achievement ===
In the first 24 hours, the music video got over 4 million views, breaking the old record of 3 million views in a day of the song "Chúng ta không thuộc về nhau" (We don’t belong together) also by Son Tung himself. After 4 days, this product reached more than 12 million views. On January 14, 2017, two weeks after its release, the MV reached over 40 million views, breaking the 40 million views in 19 days of the song “Chúng ta không thuộc về nhau". On the Zing Mp3 online music site, Son Tung's “Lạc trôi” has been leading the song chart for the first week of 2017. On January 25, 2017, the MV lost its first place into Bích Phương’s MV “Bao giờ lấy chồng”.

On March 3, 60 days after the music video was released on YouTube, the song "Lạc trôi" received more than 100 million views, becoming the Asian fastest 100 million viewer MV (if excluding Psy's music videos), breaking the previous 71-day record set by the "TT" song of Korea's Twice girl band. This MV has thus far removed the old records from Twice's "Cheers Up" and Big Bang's "Bang Bang Bang", including the V-Pop MV such as 365’s “Bống bống bang bang”, Phan Manh Quynh’s “Vợ người ta”, “Chúng ta không thuộc về nhau" and "Em của ngày hôm qua" by Son Tung himself, "Phía sau một cô gái" by Soobin Hoàng Sơn.

In the list of the most viewed music videos on YouTube on January 2, 2017, "Lạc trôi" came in at number six and was Asia's most watched MV, went over Bruno Mars's "24K Magic" and Justin Bieber's "Sorry".

== Live performances ==
On December 31, 2016, Son Tung M-TP held a performance of his new song under the witness of over 3,000 people and formally introduced the new music project "Lạc trôi". The show was featured live on YouTube by Son Tung and attracted a lot of viewers.

On the evening of January 3, Son Tung M-TP appeared on the 19th Green Wave Music Awards, at Lan Anh Theater in Ho Chi Minh City. This is the first time Son Tung M-TP has performed the song "Lạc trôi" on a musical stage since its debut on January 1. Also in this ceremony, Son Tung was honored in the category "Top Singer of the Year - Top Hit" together with other singers such as Dong Nhi, Noo Phuoc Thinh, Toc Tien and Isaac.

== Production team ==
The team involved in producing the MV "Lac troi" based on the notes below the YouTube video:

- Son Tung M-TP - lead vocal, songwriter, backing vocals
- Triple D - producer, arranger
- Ho Thu Anh - actress
- Dinh Ha Uyen Thu - director
- Do Ba Ty - designer
- Tung Bui - visual director
- Mr.Blue - post-production
- M&M HOUSE - production unit
