= MTV Europe Music Award for Best Asian Act =

Annual music award

The following is a list of the MTV Europe Music Award winners and nominees for Best Asia Act.

== 2010s ==
Year	Artist	Nationality	Ref
2010	Han Geng	China	
2010	Super Junior	South Korea	
2010	Exile	Japan	
2010	Jolin Tsai	Taiwan	
2010	Yuna Zarai	Malaysia	
2013	Chris Lee (Note: Best Southeast Asia, Mainland China, Hong Kong, Taiwan Act)	China	
2013	Show Lo	Taiwan	
2013	My Tam	Vietnam	
2013	EXO (Note: Best Japan and Korea Act)	South Korea	
2013	Momoiro Clover Z	Malaysia	
2014	Bibi Zhou	China	
2014	Hebe Tien	Taiwan	
2014	Sarah Geronimo	Philippines	
2014	B.A.P.	South Korea	
2014	Daichi Mura	Japan	
2015	Jane Zhang	China	
2015	BTS	South Korea	
2015	Dempagumi.inc	Japan	
2015	Jay Chou	Taiwan	
2015	Sơn Tùng M-TP	Vietnam	

== 2020s ==
Year	Artist	Nationality	Ref
2022	Tomorrow X Together	South Korea	
2022	Niki	Indonesia	
2022	Maymay Entrata	Philippines	
2022	SILVY	Thailand	
2022	The Rampage from Exile Tribe	Japan	
2023	Be:First	Japan	
2023	Bright	Thailand	
2023	Moira	Philippines	
2023	Tiara Andini	Indonesia	
2023	Treasure	South Korea	
2024	BINI	Philippines	
2024	Illit	South Korea	
2024	Mahalini	Indonesia	
2024	Masdo	Malaysia	
2024	Sakurazaka46	Japan	
