= WanBi Tuấn Anh =

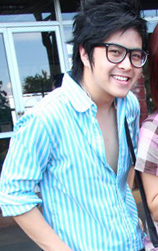
- Tuấn Anh in 2009

Background information
- Also known as: WanBi Tuấn Anh, WanBi, Ballad Prince, WanBi TA
- Born: Nguyễn Tuấn Anh; January 9, 1987; Ho Chi Minh City, Vietnam
- Died: July 21, 2013 (aged 26) Ho Chi Minh City, Vietnam
- Genres: Pop, R&B
- Occupations: Singer; songwriter; actor; model
- Years active: 2008–2012

Nguyễn Tuấn Anh (January 9, 1987 – July 21, 2013), better known by his stage name WanBi Tuấn Anh, (Note: His stage name is written "WanBi Tuấn Anh", with the character "B" capitalized, judging from the autobiography Bắt Đầu Từ Một Kết Thúc released by his manager Lý Minh Tùng.) was a Vietnamese singer, songwriter, actor and model. He won the "Promising Singer" of the Làn Sóng Xanh with Thu Thủy in 2009. WanBi's songs are mainly pop and R&B.

He was first known as a cover model for teen magazines like VTM, Hoa Học Trò, Mực Tím, Thế Giới Học Đường, and was the exclusive model for fashion brand Jack Cobra. He was also a high-profile television host and starred in many commercials. He had appeared in the television series "Áo Cưới Thiên Đường" and the film "Bóng Ma Học Đường". His best songs are "Đôi Mắt" (The Eyes), "Cho Em" (For You) and "Vụt Mất" (Slip Away).

== Life and career ==
=== Early years ===
Nguyễn Tuấn Anh on January 9, 1987, in Ho Chi Minh City, Vietnam in a family with no one follows entertainment. Around the age of 12, he joined the Tuổi Trẻ theatre group for three months. At high school, he studied at Trưng Vương High School. Tuấn Anh shared that getting attention in a matter of a short time at that time made him a little neglectful of studying. During his 12th grade, his family worried about his studies, so the family transferred him to Bùi Thị Xuân High School. There was a company invited him to join a new band, but Tuấn Anh refused, he revealed that he believed that he didn't fit in with the music and he wanted to concentrate on the national exams. After graduating from high school, he asked his parents to take a break before studying in design. This was the turning point that brought Tuấn Anh to professional singing.

=== Start ===
In 2005, Tuấn Anh won the first prize in his career as an "Impressive Face" of the competition "Diễn viên triển vọng 2005" held by the Ho Chi Minh City Film Festival. One year later, he won the "VTN" Hot VTeen Award. He participated in the contest "Video clip of you" by the Center Cable Television – Television Ho Chi Minh City and has impressed the audience through two songs "Cho Em" (Note: WanBi stated that he wrote the song for orphaned children who have to work hard but many people still think that this is a love song (WanBi Tuấn Anh's autobiography – Bắt đầu từ một kết thúc, page 40, journalist Lý Minh Tùng, publishing company Hội Nhà Văn).) and "Từng Ngày Qua", which are two songs he composed by himself and presented for the first time.

This time, his song "Cho Em" spread quickly after he posted in his personal blog. Tuấn Anh started being invited to perform at several middle schools, and many young people even established fandoms for him, so the idea of becoming a professional singer started. Tuấn Anh knows his voice isn't excellent but he has the advantage of being able to compose and is known through the teen model role. He decided to spend three years trying to sing and if failing, he would return to study.

=== Debut Album ===
January 18, 2008 marked the beginning of his professional singing career with a mini-concert in the Tea Room of Saigon. In 2008, Tuấn Anh joined singer Tóc Tiên in the song "Kem Dâu Tình Yêu". The song gained popularity among young people and entered many music charts and the name WanBi Tuấn Anh spread in the community of music due to the rapid spread of the song on the Internet. Late 2008, as the exclusive singer of Ya! Entertainment, WanBi released his debut album, WANBI0901, featuring nine songs, four of which were purchased exclusively by Nguyễn Hồng Thuận, Nguyễn Hải Phong and Liêu Hưng and five songs he composed by himself with ballads to R&B and alternative rock style. Composer Vũ Quốc Bình commented that the album WANBI0901 was one of the first proper albums at that time. The song "Đôi Mắt" with R&B style has become a big phenomenon. This song has topped the charts like "Làn Sóng Xanh", "Zing Top Song", "Yeah1 Countdown". The song "Cho Em" he sang with Thùy Chi on the album, quickly topped the list songs being heard the most.

=== 2009: Duet album, Làn Sóng Xanh award and film ===
On June 8, 2009, on behalf of his friend Tóc Tiên, who went to the United States to study, to launch the album "Chuyện Tình Vượt Thời Gian" includes the first songs released on the album as "Kem Dâu Tình Yêu", "Dự Báo Trái Tim", "Thiên Đường Nắng Mai", and old songs mixed in various styles. The idea of making an album came from a friend's suggestion when they went to karaoke fans to celebrated a friend's birthday, when Wanbi Tuấn Anh and Tóc Tiên randomly co-opted the popular songs for duet. The album was made in two months at Nguyễn Hải Phong's 23rd degree studio. As for the singing of old music, WanBi said, "This album is an improvised song. (...) WanBi just wants to change his audience's taste, and expand it to many audiences. (...). ". Also on June 8, his debut album, Wanbi 0901, won the "Most Popular Album" award for his June album Gold. In late 2009, success with Wanbi came when he and the female singer Thu Thủy were honored with the "Impressive Face of Làn Sóng Xanh" award. In this year, he also joined the movie industry with guest roles in the movie Áo Cưới Thiên Đường.

=== 2010: Thăng (#) and Bắt Sóng Cảm Xúc ===
In 2010, WanBi Tuấn Anh released the album vol.2 entitled Thăng (#) with his self-written songs. Not only writing about love, he also experimented with many other topics of life. The music style of the album is uniquely thought-provoking but different in color. Sharing the work of this album, Wanbi said it was a challenge because he wasn't a professional musician. He had to write over 20 songs and chose the ten best songs for this album. The soundtrack of the album was performed for over a year. The song "Chắp Cánh" features the rap artists of Đông Nhi this also marks the first time they sing together. Also in 2010, he also decided to join the film Bóng Ma Học Đường (former name is Hồn ma siêu quậy) directed by Lê Bảo Trung – the first film in Vietnam was made with a 3D camera. In the film, he plays Minh Quân – the son of writer Nam Linh (played by Hoài Linh), a poor, timid and a little naive student was pursued by teenager ghost.

In September 2010, WanBi released the DVD single "Bắt Sóng Cảm Xúc" sponsored by Mobifone, the music video for "Bắt Sóng Cảm Xúc" released widely and warmly received by young people. "This is the first time I wrote all the scripts for my MV. Especially the members of WanBi's fanclub had been struggling for a few days to practice choreography for the most spectacular show in the MV. ", WanBi said

=== 2011: Dấu Vết, Hóa Cơn Mưa and Phải Làm Thế Nào ===
On March 8, 2011, he released his music video Dấu Vết with Kang Ha-neul. This is the sequel to "Vụt Mất" in 2010, which quickly climbed into the charts to become his new hit. He also pioneered the filming of the sequel to the previous series in Vietnam.

MV Hoá Cơn Mưa to the audience in mid-2011 showed that a WanBi completely stripped with the image of dusty leather and hair comb up differently from other times. Wanbi co-starred with Miu Lê in the MV, however the MV was not as successful as he expected.

On November 11, 2011, Wanbi released the MV Phải Làm Thế Nào. This is a song he composed with C-Pop sound with easy listening lyrics, which helped the song become a hit for him at the end of 2011.

=== 2012: Tìm Thấy, Thật Lòng Anh Xin Lỗi and Ký Ức Chôn Sâu ===
In early 2012, the last part of the trio of tracks and also the sequel to Dấu Vết, the MV Tìm Thấy, was released. Two MVs were shot for this song including dance version and story version.

In the middle of the year until August 2012, WanBi has released two MVs Thật Lòng Anh Xin Lỗi and Ký Ức Chôn Sâu. In Thật Lòng Anh Xin Lỗi, WanBi plays as a narrator while the illustrations are assigned to his younger sister Quỳnh Mi and his close friend VJ Dustin Nguyễn and in Ký Ức Chôn Sâu, he plays with Kang Ha Neul again, this is also the last MV of his singing career.

=== Disease ===
In October 2012, WanBi Tuấn Anh announced his break from singing and WanBi revealed that he had reduced eyesight as a side effect from the chordoma cancer. (Note: WanBi Tuấn Anh's autobiography – Bắt đầu từ một kết thúc, page 71, journalist Lý Minh Tùng, publishing company Hội Nhà Văn) According to his doctor, "the disease is very rare, and the odds are one out of 1 million." WanBi said that he had been diagnosed four years earlier, after his father died, he had made several trips to Singapore and undergo several surgeries by renowned physicians there in hopes of recovering.

On the evening of November 1, 2012, many artists celebrated the night "Cảm Ơn" at the Temple of the Reclining Buddha (Ho Chi Minh City) to donate money to help with a cure, raising 1 billion VND. The music video "Cảm Ơn" by the singer Hồ Ngọc Hà started with the participation of 15 artists were bought by zing.vn site for 100 million. All proceeds from the song download in November were donated to support Wanbi Tuấn Anh.

On November 11, 2012, at the musical evening "Viết tiếp ước mơ của Thúy" (Continue writing Thúy's dream) at the Nhà văn hóa Thanh Niên Thành phố Hồ Chí Minh (Youth Cultural House of Ho Chi Minh City), WanBi Tuấn Anh tried his best to attend this event although his health was not good. He also confided in the audience and the children present in the event about his condition. Although WanBi has just undergone surgery in Singapore and his condition is not very positive, WanBi still showed his optimism, joy of living and he also gave the scholarship fund "Thuy's Dream" a sum of money to add more confidence and strength for the cancer patients there.

On the news on November 13, 2012, WanBi Tuấn Anh shared a witty confession about his condition: "I used to joke, this tumor is like a" little friend" that I have to live with to the end of my life, and can only find a way to told "him" not to play with this thing, destroy that thing, I cannot destroy it completely." He confided: "For me, each treatment is like a persistent battle, I don't know if I can win or not, but I still have to fight to the end." Sharing about the arduous treatment process, Tuấn Anh confided: “Because of this tumor, I had to undergo many dangerous surgeries. Every time I lie on the operating bed, before the anesthetic works, I always tell myself: "I must fight!". What I fear the most is the anxiety and despair of my family, not myself." Responding to the question of what power makes him able to overcome the pain and fear of the treatment process, the male singer said: “The days I am sick, I am more calm, think more and clear. One thing: "If I am pessimistic and think of negative things, it cannot solve anything, it also makes my loved ones worry more." Therefore, I always encourage myself to be optimistic and vigorously fighting the disease to the end. I share my story in the hope that my optimism is more or less empowering many people in the same situation. "

=== Death ===
At midnight on July 20, 2013, WanBi's family took him to hospital since he's had consistent high fevers, with trouble breathing, so they had to transfer him as quickly as possible . By his request, he was taken home the next morning and was placed on a ventilator. On the afternoon of July 21, he stopped breathing of his own accord and was declared brain dead, so doctors removed his ventilator around 4:00 pm. Tuấn Anh passed away at 4:23 pm on July 21, 2013, at the age of 26.

His funeral took place at Wanbi Tuấn Anh's home in Da Kao Ward, District 1, Ho Chi Minh City on the morning of July 24, 2013, and was covered in white and blue. As of his request when he was still alive, his body was taken to the Cremation Center in Bình Hưng Hòa Cemetery for cremation. His remains were brought to a temple in Phú Nhuận district and placed next to his father, while the ashes were spread across the Saigon River from the Phú Mỹ Bridge, where he filmed the MV "Bắt Sóng Cảm Xúc". A star was named "WanBi Tuấn Anh" after the late singer, which was certified by the International Star Registry in September 2013.

=== Bắt Đầu Từ Một Kết Thúc and the final album ===
On the occasion of what would have been his 27th birthday, the autobiography "Bắt Đầu Từ Một Kết Thúc" was released. It tells WanBi's journey of singing while fighting with his disease for 4 years, and was written by Lý Minh Tùng – a journalist and WanBi's manager. The autobiography was started in 2009 and was interrupted, then continued after his funeral for a week.

Along with his autobiography is his last album – Nụ Cười Còn Mãi included many songs that WanBi had recorded but had not yet released. All proceeds from autobiography and album were donated to Cảm Ơn fund by WanBi Tuấn Anh to help the needy children in the Angel Institute.

== Personal life ==
WanBi's hobbies were watching movies, reading comic strips, taking photographs and drinking milk tea. His favorite singers were Christina Aguilera, Wang Leehom, Hikaru Utada and Mỹ Tâm. As for the meaning of his stage name "WanBi Tuấn Anh," he explained: "My name at home is Bi. When I'm grown up, I shouldn't be called Bi again, so I made an uncommon nickname for chatting. I chose WanBi, the name has no meaning, it just sounds good to me. When I started my singing career, I picked the stage name "WanBi Tuấn Anh".".

WanBi was a Buddhist and his Dharma name was "Minh Tú".

== Evaluation ==
According to many reporters and artists, WanBi Tuấn Anh was a responsible, good-natured and polite singer. In any job, WanBi is also very responsible. With many people, WanBi is "the guy does not frown". After his father's death, Tuấn Anh became the breadwinner and he worked tirelessly to support his mother and raise his younger sister.

According to WanBi's mother, he was really calm and didn't complain anything even if the doctor said that his tumor was a rare disease, and he only had 5 years more to live while everyone else was extremely confused and shocked. WanBi always simplified his illness and he didn't tell any of his friends about the severity of his disease. At the end of 2011, when the illness got worse, WanBi's right eye was damaged, he had his hair covered his right eye. Many people, including his fans, asked him about his right eye, WanBi still decided to hide the truth and simply answered that he had an eye pain so he had to cover the eye with his hair. WanBi didn't want his fans to be pitied or worried about him.

== Discography ==
=== Studio albums ===
- WANBI0901 (2008)
- Chuyện Tình Vượt Thời Gian (with Tóc Tiên) (2009)
- Thăng (#) (2010)
- Nụ cười Còn Mãi Vol. Cuối (2014)

=== Compilation albums ===
- Khúc Ca Cho Em (2014)

=== Singles ===
- "Vụt Mất" (2010)
- "Bắt Sóng Cảm xúc" (2010)
- "Dấu Vết" (2011)
- "Tìm Thấy" (2012)
- "Thật Lòng Anh Xin Lỗi" (2012)
- "Ký Ức Chôn Sâu (2012)
- "Cảm ơn" (2012)

=== Music videos ===
- "Đôi Mắt"
- "Loving You"
- "Vụt Mất"
- "Vụt Mất (ver. 2.0)"
- "Dòng Thư Cuối"
- "Let Go"
- "Let Go" (English version)
- "Bắt Đầu Từ Một Kết Thúc"
- "Bắt Sóng Cảm Xúc"
- "Dấu Vết"
- "Nhịp Tim" (with Kang Ha Neul)
- "Đêm Tình Nhân" (with Kang Ha Neul)
- "Hóa Cơn Mưa"
- "Phải Làm Thế Nào"
- "Ký Ức Chôn Sâu" (with Kang Ha Neul)
- "Cảm Ơn"
- "Thật Lòng Anh Xin Lỗi"
- "Nụ Cười Còn Mãi"
- "Tìm Thấy (dance ver.)"
- "Tìm Thấy (story ver.)"

== WanBi Tuấn Anh's compositions ==
WanBi Tuấn Anh once stated "I never dare to admit that I'm a musician, I'm just an emotional songwriter. In my compositions, I not only talk about love but also convey my confidences and things that I cannot express in words. That is my gratitude to my family, the pain that cannot be relieved, my appreciation for my friends, colleagues, the audience, etc. In the most depressing and most desperate moments, the music gave me hope and energy to move on, so that I still felt my valuable in life." (Note: WanBi Tuấn Anh's autobiography – Bắt đầu từ một kết thúc, page 267, journalist Lý Minh Tùng, publishing company Hội Nhà Văn)In his singing career, most of his songs were written by WanBi Tuấn Anh himself:

1. Cho Em (English: For You (Note: WanBi Tuấn Anh once performed the English version of this song with Nicole Asensio in 2009.))
2. Từng Ngày Qua (English: Day By Day)
3. Dự Báo Trái Tim (English: Forecast My Heart)
4. Chuyện Tình Gió (English: Wind Love Story)
5. Loving You
6. Lời Yêu (English: Say Love)
7. Ngày Nắng Bên Trời (English: Sunny Day Next To Me)
8. Điều Ước Cho Mùa Xuân (English: Wishes For The Spring)
9. Bước Chân Mùa Thu (English: Autumn Footsteps)
10. Vụt Mất (English: Slip Away)
11. Dòng Thư Cuối (English: The Last Letter)
12. Hãy Tỉnh Giấc (English: Just Wake Up)
13. Let Go
14. Bắt Đầu Từ Một Kết Thúc (English: Starting From The End)
15. Together Forever
16. Vượt Dốc (English: Slide The Slope)
17. Chắp Cánh (English: Fly To The Sky)
18. Cảm Ơn (English: Thank You)
19. Bắt Sóng Cảm Xúc (English: Catch The Emotions)
20. Dấu Vết (English: Love Trace)
21. Hóa Cơn Mưa (English: The Cold Rain)
22. Phải Làm Thế Nào (English: What Should I Do)
23. Tìm Thấy (English: Found It)
24. Thật Lòng Anh Xin Lỗi (English: Honestly I'm Sorry)
25. Cơ Hội Đánh Rơi (English: Lost The Chance)
26. Còn Mong Chờ Chi (English: Still Waiting For You)
27. Tíc Tắc (English: Tick Tack)
28. Tốt Hơn Cho Chúng Ta (English: Better For Us)
29. Nụ Cười Còn Mãi (English: Be Happy Always Smile)

== Filmography ==
| Year | Năm | Role | Note |
TV series
| 2009 | Áo cưới thiên đường | Thành Phúc singer | In "Đám cưới sao" episodes |
Film
| 2010 | Bóng ma học đường | Minh Quân | |

The film Chàng trai năm ấy made by director Nguyễn Quang Huy published on 31/12/2016 is based on the autobiography "Bắt đầu từ một kết thúc" of WanBi's former manager, Lý Minh Tùng, wrote about Wanbi Tuấn Anh's life.

== Awards ==
- "Impressive Face" of the contest Điện ảnh Thành phố Hồ Chí Minh (2005)
- "Hot VTeen 2006" of VTM
- Promising Singer of Làn Sóng Xanh (2009)
- On December 16, 2013, WanBi's song "Cảm Ơn" gave him the award "Top 10 songwriters have most favorite songs"
