= Dandelion (2014 film) =

- Theatrical release poster
- Chàng trai năm ấy
- Directed by: Nguyễn Quang Huy
- Screenplay by: Quang Huy; Nhật Bành; Ngọc Phượng
- Based on: "Bắt đầu từ một kết thúc" by Lý Minh Tùng
- Starring: Sơn Tùng M-TP; Hari Won; Phạm Quỳnh Anh; Ngô Kiến Huy; Hứa Vĩ Văn
- Cinematography: Trang Công Minh
- Edited by: Ngô Phước Trường; Quang Huy
- Music by: Nguyễn Hà
- Production companies: Galaxy Studios; WePro Entertainment
- Release date: December 31, 2014 (Vietnam)
- Running time: 115 minutes
- Country: Vietnam
- Language: Vietnamese
- Budget: 10 billion VND ($466,418)
- Box office: 42 billion VND ($1,958,955)

Dandelion (Vietnamese: Chàng trai năm ấy) is a 2014 Vietnamese romantic comedy drama film directed by Nguyễn Quang Huy, starring Sơn Tùng M-TP, Hari Won, Phạm Quỳnh Anh, Ngô Kiến Huy, Hứa Vĩ Văn. The film's screenplay is based on the book "Bắt đầu từ một kết thúc", an autobiography about the life of the ill-fated singer Wanbi Tuấn Anh.

== Plot ==
The movie is about Dinh Phong (Son Tung M-TP) and his group of friend: Ngo Kien Ha (Ngo Kien Huy), Pham Quynh Bang (Pham Quynh Anh) whose motto is "Chả sợ gì, chỉ sợ già" (I'm afraid of nothing, aside aging), a Korean girl Sky (Hari Won) and Manager Lam (Hua Vi Van) who worships money.

Dinh Phong's father passes away after being hospitalized for a while. One of his wishes are to keep smiling and to eat dog meat before dying. Dinh Phong keeps pursuing music career after the death of his father, even dreams of having a concert on his own, however Lam forces him to become an actor.

At the audition, one of his eyes is sore so he visits the hospital to be diagnosed with a tumor and have to be hospitalized for a short time. His mom forbids him from singing but he sneaks out of the hospital to perform at liveshows. After leaving the hospital, Lam receive a notice from the doctor informing that Dinh Phong has a cancer and is only able to live for 5 years maximum.

Although feeling desperate from his diagnosis, Phong still keeps trying to live positively. In the last gig, he reveals that Lam is the one who took all of his money and hides his medical situation so he could keep performing, following his own will. Kien Ha punches Lam and they cry together.

Previously, Phong met Lam at a bridge where Phong said: "I don't care about how long I'm able to live, but as long as I still live, please let me live the happiest life ever, let me sing as much as possible". Phong refuses treatments since he can't stand seeing his family worry about him.

After battling with cancer, Dinh Phong passes away in the mourning of his family and fans.

After his death, his friends visit him at the pagoda. His mother opens crab hotpot as wishes, Lam sends all of Phong's money for children living under unfortunate condition. Ha and Bang get married and have kids, Sky gets married many years later.

== Cast ==
- Sơn Tùng M-TP as Dinh Phong (Đình Phong)
- Hari Won as Sky
- Phạm Quỳnh Anh as Pham Quynh Bang (Phạm Quỳnh Băng)
- Ngô Kiến Huy as Ngo Kien Ha (Ngô Kiến Hà)
- Hứa Vĩ Văn as Lam (Lâm)
- Khánh Huyền as Phong's mother
- Quang Thắng as Phong's father
- Will (365 band) as Tuan Kiet (Tuấn Kiệt)
- Don Nguyễn as Quang Huy, Phong's fantastic fan
- Hà Linh as psychiatrist
- Thành Lộc as film director
- Jayvee Mai Thế Hiệp as optician
- Gee Trương as milk tea seller
- Petey Majik Nguyễn as doctor in Singapore (cameo)
- Ngọc Tưởng as Sky's husband (cameo)
- Tấn Thi as Huy's father (cameo)
- Hoài An as Huy's mother (cameo)
- Harry Lu as himself (Huy's boyfriend / cameo)
- Minh Hằng as herself (cameo)
- Trịnh Thăng Bình as himself (cameo)
- Nguyên Khang as himself (cameo)
- Bảo Anh as herself (cameo)
- Trung Quân Idol as himself (cameo)
- Khổng Tú Quỳnh as herself (cameo)
- Hoàng Tôn as himself (cameo)
- Phạm Hồng Phước as himself (cameo)
- Quốc Thiên as himself (cameo)

== Awards and nominations ==
Year	Award	Category	Recipient	Result
2015	Men of The Year	The Team of The Year	Sơn Tùng M-TP with others	Won
2015	Golden Kite Awards	Best New Actor	Sơn Tùng M-TP	Won

== Release ==
The film's official trailer and poster were released on September 8, 2014. At first, the film was set for release on November 14, 2014. However, on November 11, Galaxy Studios and WePro Entertainment, the production companies of "Dandelion" decided to delay the release date but didn't announce another official one. Their press release stated that it was "the issue with the song "Chắc ai đó sẽ về" by Sơn Tùng M-TP that led to the decision". The manufacturers also stated that they would announce another press conference as soon as possible and would provide authentic news to the media.

On the morning of December 5, 2014, Vietnam Ministry of Culture, Sports and Tourism announced that the film could be theatrically released on the condition that Sơn Tùng M-TP must replace the instrumental beat of the song "Chắc ai đó sẽ về" because of certain similarities with that of the song "Because I miss you". Galaxy Studio immediately announced a new release date for the film, December 31, 2014.

== Reception ==
=== Ticket sales ===
Only on the first day of debut, the boy reached the turnover of 6 billions - the figure is quite high with the Vietnamese film. By the end of January 4, the film received about 400,000 spectators in theaters nationwide. With more than 3,000 performances, the boy earned more than 30 billion VND. Almost all major cinemas across the country have the majority of projectors and projection screens throughout the day. In crowded cinemas, the schedule of the boys was very dense, almost 30 minutes away from having a movie theater. According to information from theaters, Dandelion became the first choice of the audience during the New Year 2015, when the movie's screenings are full of theaters. Recorded by the audience, most of them were surprised, excited and tearful when watching the movie. Director Quang Huy directly went to the movie to see the film's effects and commented, "What made me most satisfied was that almost all of the audience responses praised the cast."

On Friday, January 9, 2015, Director Quang Huy confirmed total revenue of film has reached over 42 billion, after a week to the cinema. After this film is 60 billion.

=== Critical response ===
In general, the film received a lot of praise, especially from teenagers, in which many people gave praise to the soundtrack. However, a part of the audience still does not appreciate the quality of the film and wait for something new, more attractive in the director Quang Huy in the following.

After the film was released, some viewers commented that the film portrays a different, even misleading image of WanBi Tuấn Anh. Lý Minh Tùng, WanBi's manager as well as author of the autobiography tells about WanBi, also claims that the director "didn't devote all of his "love" to WanBi as he promised when he embarked on the adaptation of WanBi's autobiography". Tùng said that "The explanation "The movie is just inspired from WanBi" or when he declared "Dandelion is not the film about WanBi Tuấn Anh", in my opinion is a very intelligent excuse of director Quang Huy, but lack of responsibility and respect towards WanBi." In the introduction line and on the movie poster showed the film was adapted from the autobiography, the character Đình Phong was "copied" by the director to 80% of the real details from WanBi's life, so it cannot be said that the film was only inspired by WanBi. The film has many fictitious details that offend the late singer and his late father, like Đình Phong's father eats and has a "declaration" about dog meat right on his hospital bed, or Đình Phong has an insolent attitude towards his seniors, begs kindness and compassion of the audience and colleagues to raise money for his medical treatment, which is completely different from the original version. Tùng said that from the beginning, he has agreed with the director that the characters or episodes could be creative, but he must respect all the details related to character Đình Phong and his family. Finally, he said that the director must officially apologize for the fictions that affected WanBi's image. However, as "an audience", Tùng said that this is an emotional movie with many plus points. He also praised the film's cast.

In response to these responses, Sơn Tùng M-TP said, "I accept that, because I also have fans, so I understand how fans feel for their idol. From the true story of their idol, people have the rights to hope, like the character that will be like WanBi, with a smile like WanBi, and physique, spirit, etc. are like Wanbi. When I heard those words, I told Quang Huy that I accepted them, and Huy also told me to accept them, because I'm not WanBi.
