= Billboard Vietnam =

Vietnamese edition of Billboard magazine

Billboard Việt Nam
- Website type: Music online magazine
- Available in: Vietnamese
- Owners: Purpose Media Co. Ltd. Billboard New York
- Editor: Bui Vu Thanh
- Website: billboardvn.vn
- Launched: December 2017; 8 years ago
- Current status: active

Billboard Việt Nam is an online Vietnamese music magazine, owned by Purpose Media Company Limited in partnership with Billboard.

== History ==
The magazine made its first public appearance as an organizer of the New Year's Countdown Lights 2018 in Ho Chi Minh City, Vietnam. Billboard Việt Nam features music news, reviews, interviews and analysis of the music industry both domestically and internationally.

== Charts ==
Billboard Vietnam publishes two weekly singles charts, namely Vietnam Hot 100 and Top Vietnamese Songs, with their first issue launched on January 4, 2022. Both charts measure tracks' activities in digital downloads and online streaming, but only Vietnamese-language songs are ranked on the latter.

== See also ==
- Billboard charts
- Billboard (magazine)
- Billboard Indonesia
- Billboard Philippines
- Billboard China
- Billboard Japan
