= Favorite Song (TV series) =

Vietnamese music television program

- Genre: Music, Entertainment
- Presented by: Danh Tùng; Thùy Linh
- Country of origin: Vietnam
- Original language: Vietnamese

Production
- Running time: 120 minutes

Original release
- Network: VTV
- Release: January 15, 2012 – January 15, 2016

Favorite Song (Vietnamese: Bài hát yêu thích) is a Vietnamese music television program broadcast by VTV. The live show airs on the first Sunday of every month at 21:00 UTC+7 while the weekly chart show airs every Sunday at 14:15 UTC+7. It is hosted by Danh Tùng and Thùy Linh. The show was introduced as a music chart for Vietnamese songs.

== Chart system ==
=== Songs selection ===
Before the live show's airing, nominated songs introduced by various sources will be judged by the select council consists of 15 people to choose a shortlist. After that, the view counts on the official website for those songs in the shortlist will be counted towards the final result. Top 12 songs from this selection round will be performed on the month's live show.

=== Chart voting ===
After the live show, the voting council, which consists of 120 people, will have another round of judgement with 60% of the chart will be based on the council's decision. SMS votes and proper view counts for the songs on the official website have a share of 40% in deciding the chart. These results form the monthly chart (only SMS votes and view counts are counted for the weekly chart). Each month, new songs are introduced while the songs from the previous months are still available for voting. This continues to the end of the year when there will be a yearly chart.

== First place winners ==
List of First place winners

January: Uyên Linh - Người hát tình ca (19,509 / 41,211 views, 331 / 2559 council votes, 11130 / 28,838 SMS votes, total: 27.95%)

- Jan 15 - Uyên Linh - Người hát tình ca (3222 / 8190 views, 3069 / 10,970 SMS votes, total: 23.30%)
- Jan 20 - Uyên Linh - Người hát tình ca (2300 / 14,383 views, 2340 / 15,763 SMS votes, total: 28.03%)
- Jan 27 - Uyên Linh - Người hát tình ca (9353 / 19,174 views, 4051 / 9424 SMS votes, total: 29.41%)

February: Văn Mai Hương - Nếu như anh đến (14,754 / 108,882 views, 278 / 2531 council votes, 34,534 / 83,089 SMS votes, total: 19.01%)

- Feb 3 - Uyên Linh - Người hát tình ca (15,748 / 40,114 views, 4882 / 16,144 SMS votes, total: 20.00%)
- Feb 10 - Văn Mai Hương - Nếu như anh đến (5335 / 19,938 views, 12638 / 28,098 SMS votes, total: 21.85%)
- Feb 17 - Văn Mai Hương - Nếu như anh đến (3373 / 22,409 views, 9581 / 23,681 SMS votes, total: 18.96%)
- Feb 24 - Văn Mai Hương - Nếu như anh đến (1444 / 28,651 views, 6929 / 13,414 SMS votes, total: 20.26%)

March: Nguyễn Ngọc Anh - Sẽ mãi yêu anh ( 11,603 / 225,798 views, 89 / 3103 council votes, 135,173 / 288,074 SMS votes, total: 14.22%)

- March 2 - Văn Mai Hương - Nếu như anh đến (1071 / 35,438 views, 12,483 / 35,326 SMS votes, total: 12.40%)
- March 9 - Nguyễn Ngọc Anh - Sẽ mãi yêu anh (1443 / 52,260 views, 94,617 / 161,438 SMS votes, total: 16.79%)
- March 16 - Thu Minh - Bay (9504 / 66,625 views, 17,756 / 69,058 SMS votes, total: 13.29%)
- March 23 - Nguyễn Ngọc Anh - Sẽ mãi yêu anh (5485 / 65,828 views, 8907 / 20,723 SMS votes, total 13.72%)

April:

- March 30 - Văn Mai Hương - Nếu như anh đến (1240 / 48,899 views, 6163 / 24,299 SMS votes, total: 9.52%)
- April 6 - Mỹ Dung - Mình bên nhau mãi (2771 / 42,449 views, 3750 / 17,746 SMS votes, total: 9.90%)
- April 13 - Uyên Linh - Người hát tình ca (17,906 / 43,809 views, 4008 / 12,622 SMS votes, total: 16.78%)
- April 20 - Mỹ Dung - Mình bên nhau mãi (12,857 / 75,994 views, 9778 / 21,460 SMS votes, total: 17.56%)
