= Green Wave (radio show) =

Làn Sóng Xanh
- Other names: Làn Sóng Xanh
- Genre: Music
- Running time: 60 minutes
- Country of origin: Vietnam
- Language: Vietnamese
- Home station: Voice of Ho Chi Minh City
- Recording studio: Ho Chi Minh City
- Original release: 1997 – present
- Audio format: Stereophonic sound
- Website: http://lansongxanh.vn/

Làn Sóng Xanh (English: "Green Wave") is a Vietnamese music chart programme. The major popular music award in Vietnam, one of the nation’s biggest music contests. Làn Sóng Xanh was launched in 1997 by the Voice of Ho Chi Minh City radio station. Winning the award distinguishes the most successful V-Pop singers.

== History ==
=== Beginnings ===
To change the "music on demand" format that had become popular on radio stations across the country, the Voice of Ho Chi Minh City People (VOH) launched the Top Ten Làn Sóng Xanh (Green Wave) program, with its first broadcast on September 7, 1997. The organizers quickly received voting letters from the audience, and the September chart was announced during the Làn Sóng Xanh broadcast on October 5. The song that topped and opened the chart was "Chị tôi" (My Sister) by composer Trọng Đài, performed by the then-young singer Mỹ Linh. Ranking second was "Con gái" (Girls) by Phương Thảo - Ngọc Lễ, and third was "Hà Nội mùa vắng cơn mưa" (Hanoi in the Season Without Rain), with music by Trương Quý Hải and lyrics by Bùi Thanh Tuấn, performed by Cẩm Vân. In some months, the editorial board received 4,000 to 5,000 voting letters from listeners.

From its early days, Làn Sóng Xanh created a wave of intense fandom across Vietnam, ushering in the youth music genre that was taking shape in Vietnam in the late 1990s. Làn Sóng Xanh was broadcast weekly as a top 10 list of the most popular Vietnamese songs, and at the end of the year, grand performance and award nights were held, gathering almost all the biggest stars in Vietnam. Làn Sóng Xanh has always been considered by the media as the "thermometer" for the popularity of songs and singers in Vietnam.

During this decade, most music labels had their own branded products. Composer and manager Đỗ Quân, who had just started working at Bến Thành Audio & Video Center, along with Center Director Huỳnh Tiết, Deputy Director Tô Văn Anh Kiệt, music editor Đỗ Quang, and MC Thanh Hải, planned to invest both company and personal funds to stage Làn Sóng Xanh at the Lan Anh stage and then organize it in Hanoi as well. They organized the first year-end summary liveshow, Làn Sóng Xanh 1997, in April 1998; Làn Sóng Xanh 1998 was also held in 1999, both directed by Đỗ Quang. The position of general director for the Làn Sóng Xanh liveshows was subsequently held by Huỳnh Phúc Điền for many years.

=== 20th Anniversary ===
The organizers held a series of events starting with two "The Hits" programs at Nguyễn Huệ Pedestrian Street on October 14 and 15, 2017. This was followed by the "VIP Show - Recognition Night" at 7:30 PM on January 12, 2018, at the Military Zone 7 Indoor Sports Complex. Finally, the "Gala Music Festival Làn Sóng Xanh - 20-Year Reunion" was scheduled to last over seven hours, from 4:00 PM to 11:30 PM on January 19, 2018, at the Military Zone 7 Stadium, featuring the appearance and collaboration of three or four generations of Làn Sóng Xanh singers and composers.

The two "The Hits" programs were held as scheduled. The "VIP Show - Recognition Night" and the "Gala Music Festival Làn Sóng Xanh - 20-Year Reunion" were merged into a single event, "20 Years of Làn Sóng Xanh Music Festival - The Journey of Stars and Vietnamese Music Lovers," on January 12, 2018, at the Military Zone 7 Stadium, consisting of four events:

- The "Green Run" marathon to raise funds for the "Sát cánh cùng gia đình Việt" (Standing with Vietnamese Families) fund of the Voice of Ho Chi Minh City People - VOH.
- The 2017 Làn Sóng Xanh Awards ceremony.
- A program honoring composers and singers who won Làn Sóng Xanh awards over the past 20 years.
- The 20-Year Làn Sóng Xanh Music Gala.

This event did not receive as much public attention as expected; near the start time, only about 600 spectators had entered the stadium, with about 300 outside. Additionally, due to the absence of big-name artists to receive awards, the announcement and presentation part happened quickly. The list of winners was replaced by a poorly produced announcement clip.

=== New Version ===
On July 18, 2018, the Voice of Ho Chi Minh City People (VOH) held a press conference to announce the new version, Làn Sóng Xanh - Next Step. In collaboration with the Madison Group, Làn Sóng Xanh entered its 21st year, bringing music lovers a new and attractive music program.

Specifically, for the weekly broadcasts, Làn Sóng Xanh changed its format to live broadcasts on FM 99.9 MHz from 12:00 PM to 1:00 PM every Friday, also streaming on vivo.vn. The program content features famous artists, singers, and composers whose songs are nominated in the Làn Sóng Xanh charts.

On the last Thursday evening of every month, the Làn Sóng Xanh - Next Step program is held at the VOH Theater. The highlight of the program is the "Challenge Song" segment, a place for arrangers and music producers to showcase their artistic creativity by refreshing famous songs. The organizers also create a dedicated stage for debut performances or comeback projects of singers, combined with appearances by stars from the 20-year Làn Sóng Xanh charts, creating a musical space that bridges generations of singers. The program is broadcast live on FM 99.9 MHz, streamed on vivo.vn, and on the AMC – SCTV2 channel.

Furthermore, the Làn Sóng Xanh award structure has undergone many changes, from voting criteria to nomination categories. It will become the first music award in Vietnam to have a voting council (expected to be around 250 members) consisting of prestigious individuals in the arts. Having a voting council with many famous members ensures a professional perspective for the hit songs in the Làn Sóng Xanh charts. The voting council, along with the public, will nominate and select typical composers, singers, songs, and music categories that embody both market appeal and artistic quality. The organizers will hold a session to invite these members to vote directly at the station for several important categories.
