= Hậu Hoàng =

Vietnamese YouTuber and Dancer (born 1995)

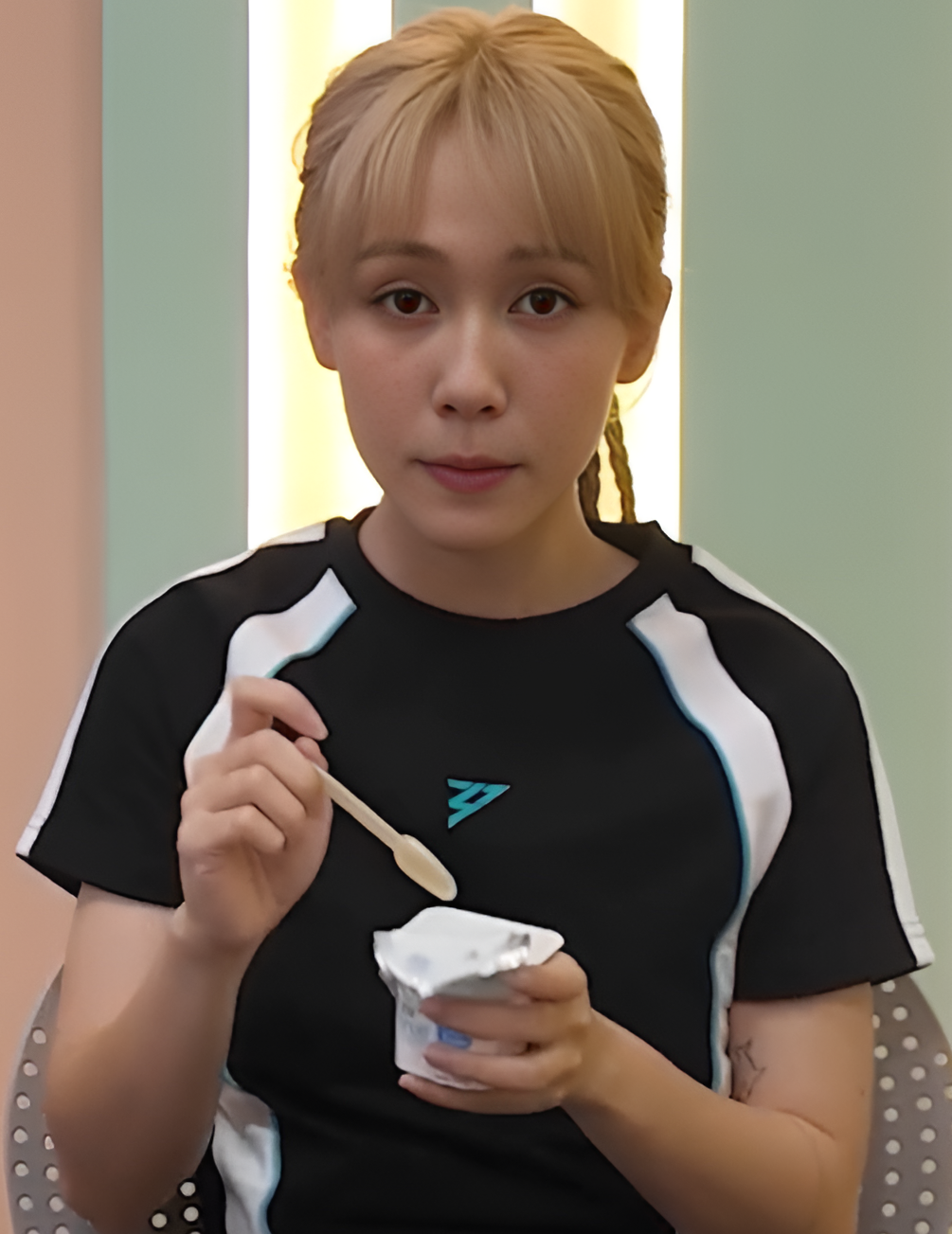
- Hậu Hoàng in 2024
- Born: Hoàng Thúy Hậu; July 4, 1995 (age 31); Hanoi, Vietnam
- Occupations: YouTuber; Dance
- Known for: Parody songs on YouTube
- Height: 1.55 m (5 ft 1 in)

YouTube information
- Channel: Hau Hoang
- Years active: 2014–present
- Genres: Music; Entertainment
- Subscribers: 8.37 million
- Views: 3.67 billion
- Last updated: March 16, 2026

Hoàng Thúy Hậu (born July 4, 1995), commonly known by her stage name Hậu Hoàng, is a Vietnamese YouTuber and dancer who publishes parody music videos on YouTube.

== Life and career ==
Hoàng Thúy Hậu was born on July 4, 1995, in Hanoi to a family of military officers and is a former student of finance, Academy of Finance (Hanoi). In her fourth year of university, she uploaded a cover clip called "Lép" to the internet with the intention of "just for fun," but the video became famous and was well received by many people. After graduating, she worked as an office worker but quit this job and started spending time making vlog and some humorous videos to upload to YouTube. She is also a member of the dance group S.U.D Crew, which has posted some funny dance clips together on the 9GAG page. Her first video attracted millions of views and hundreds of thousands of comments, she shared:

"The fact that my first clip was uploaded to 9gag shocked me quite a bit, but it was a joyful shock because not only domestically but also internationally, many people loved and supported it. Many people from other countries messaged me saying they really liked my video. The other day, my dance group went filming with a film crew from Malaysia, and they recognized me and told me that the clip was very popular and well-known."

At the first METUB WebTV Asia Awards 2019 held in Vietnam, she won in two categories: Most Popular Creator of the Year and Creator Collaboration Video of the Year with "The Power of the Red Star" (in collaboration with the beverage brand Good Mood). On January 25, 2020, Hậu Hoàng released the video "Nhìn lại 2019" based on the song "Duyên Âm" by singer Hoàng Thùy Linh, combining her outstanding parody music products from the past year. This video also made it into the Top 10 Most Popular YouTube Videos of 2020: [Parody Music] Nhìn lại 2019 - Hậu Hoàng - Thank You Everyone - Number 1.

According to the website Noxinfluencer, Hậu Hoàng is the 10th most subscribed Vietnamese YouTube channel with 7.3 million and the highest average number of views per video with 56 million. According to data on the Social Blade website, the channel has uploaded 63 videos and has a total of over 2 billion views; her monthly income is estimated at $44,300–$708,440.

Since the beginning of 2020, Hậu Hoàng has shifted from remixing popular songs to singing new compositions produced by her own team or "commissioned"; most of the products in 2020 are new compositions by musician Hứa Kim Tuyền, with lyrics handled by Hậu Hoàng's team.

In 2020, Hậu Hoàng participated in Star in the Army 2020: Female Warrior with Nam Thư, Diệu Nhi, Dương Hoàng Yến, Đỗ Khánh Vân, and Kỳ Duyên. In 2024, she was one of the 30 members participating in Chị đẹp đạp gió rẽ sóng.

== Private life ==
Despite being a YouTuber, Hậu is afraid of cameras, video recorders, and crowded places. Because of this, she has refused many television game shows and collaborations with other parties, only feeling comfortable sitting alone in front of the camera or working with a familiar team. In her work, Hau is described as "careful and responsible": she never advertises health or cosmetic products that she hasn't used. Hậu opposes YouTube channels with violent or offensive content. In the future, she plans to expand the content of her channel through program projects, short films, etc. She also enjoys a playful and youthful style of dress.

== List of parody songs ==
Title	Publication Date	Original Work	Original Artist	Composition
"Chiếc bụng đói" (Note: The parody music video has been removed from YouTube.)		"Chiếc bụng đói"	Thanh Ngân	Tiên Cookie
"Kỷ yếu cực mạnh"	June 26, 2017; 9 years ago	"ABC Chuk Kra Took"	Sunny Suwanmethanon, Preechaya Pongthananikorn	
"Chuyện gái trai"	July 24, 2017; 9 years ago	"Ai" (อาย)	Natalie Stybert (นาตาลี Natalee)	
"Sếp cứ dí chúng em sống sao?"	November 21, 2017; 8 years ago	"Anh xấu xí chứ không xấu xa"	Don Nguyễn	Nguyên Jenda
"Học hè"	January 28, 2018; 8 years ago	"Sweet Dream"	Jang Na-ra	
"Học tiếng mèo kêu"	September 14, 2018; 7 years ago	"Học tiếng mèo kêu"	Tiểu Phong Phong, Tiểu Phan Phan	Tiểu Phong Phong
"Chuyện chị em công sở"	October 17, 2018; 7 years ago	"Teen vọng cổ"	Vĩnh Thuyên Kim	Trần Anh Khôi
"20/11"	November 17, 2018; 7 years ago	"Mình yêu nhau đi"	Bích Phương	Tiên Cookie
"Nhậu cũng là 1 đam mê"	November 22, 2018; 7 years ago	"Oh Oh Oh" (โอ๊ะ โอ๊ะ โอ๊ะ)	China Dolls	Choot Rub Kaek/ Chatchai Chabamnet (ชัชชัย ชาบำเหน็จ)
"Kém duyên"	December 13, 2018; 7 years ago	"Kém duyên"	Rum, NIT, Masew	Hưng Nguyễn, Rum
"Dọn nhà đón Tết"	January 7, 2019; 7 years ago	"Làm người yêu anh nhé baby"	Ba chú bộ đội	Nguyên Jenda
"Lùn thì sao?"	January 15, 2019; 7 years ago	"Dragostea Din Tei"	O-Zone	Dan Bălan
"Tấm Cám chuyện Hậu Hoàng sắp kể"	January 25, 2019; 7 years ago	"Boom, Boom, Boom, Boom!!"	Vengaboys	Dennis van Den Driesschen, Benny Andersson, Wessel van Diepen, Björn Ulvaeus
"Cuộc sống là những cú lừa"	February 2, 2019; 7 years ago	"Katyusha" (Катюша)		Mikhail Vasilyevich Isakovsky
"Tấm Cám chuyện Hậu Hoàng sắp kể - Phần 2"	February 28, 2019; 7 years ago	"Tarzan & Jane"	Toy-Box	Per Holm, Toy-Box
"Những chị đại học đường"	March 11, 2019; 7 years ago	"...Baby One More Time"	Britney Spears	Max Martin
"Kế hoạch tán trai - Những chị đại học đường 2"	April 16, 2019; 7 years ago	"Anh Tin Mình Đã Cho Nhau Một Kỷ Niệm"	Lương Bằng Quang, Thu Thủy	
"Nạn mời cưới"	April 26, 2019; 7 years ago	"Zunea Zunea"	Cleopatra Stratan	
"Những chị đại học đường (phần 3)"	May 11, 2019; 7 years ago	"Circus"	Britney Spears	
"Tây du ký (4 cô trò Đường Tăng đến Hà Nội)"	May 21, 2019; 7 years ago	"Despacito"	Luis Fonsi, Daddy Yankee	Luis Rodríguez, Erika Ender, Ramón Ayala
"Tấm Cám chuyện Hậu Hoàng sắp kể (phần 3)"	June 6, 2019; 7 years ago	"Run To You"	DJ DOC	
"Chuyện nghề shipper"	July 17, 2019; 7 years ago	"Bingo"	Turtles	
"Chuyện xóm trọ"		"Sha-La-La-La-La"	Vengaboys	Torben Lendager, Poul Dehnhardt
"Những kiểu người trong rạp chiếu phim"	September 7, 2019; 6 years ago	"Mắt nai cha cha cha"	Hồng Ngọc	Sỹ Luân
"Sức mạnh của Sao Đỏ"	September 23, 2019; 6 years ago	"Ông xã em number one"	Don Nguyễn	Percy Mayfield
"Chuyện lần đầu tập gym"	October 11, 2019; 6 years ago	Và tôi hát	Đoàn Thế Lân	Đoàn Thế Lân
"Tuổi thơ tôi"	October 24, 2019; 6 years ago	"Thằng Tàu Lai"	Jimmy Nguyễn	tác giả Nhạc Ngoại (Trung Hoa)
"Bạch Tuyết chuyện Hậu Hoàng sắp kể"	November 23, 2019; 6 years ago	"Tiểu thư kiêu kỳ"	Vũ Hà	Nhạc ngoại; lời Việt: Hữu Ân
"Chị em cây khế"	December 28, 2019; 6 years ago	"Anh nhà ở đâu thế"	Amee amd B Ray	Lyly
"Nhìn lại 2019"	January 25, 2020; 6 years ago	"Duyên âm"	Hoàng Thùy Linh	DTAP
"Cô bé nhọ nhem"	December 11, 2021; 4 years ago	"Rồi tới luôn"	NAL	NAL
"Cô bé quàng khăn đỏ"	January 27, 2022	"Tết đong đầy"	Kay Trần, Nguyễn Khoa, Duck V	Nguyễn Khoa
"Ngôi làng bất ổn"	August 6, 2022	"Rồi nâng cái ly"	NAL	NAL
"Đội bóng bất ổn"	December 16, 2022	"Mặt mộc"	Phạm Nguyên Ngọc, VAnh, Ân Nhi	Phạm Nguyên Ngọc, Ân Nhi
"Cô dâu GenZ"	July 11, 2023	"Hình như ta thích nhau"	Doãn Hiếu	Doãn Hiếu
"Đại chiến lớp trưởng"	October 2, 2023	"You are my crush"	Quân A.P, Nguyên Jenda	Quân A.P, Nguyên Jenda

== Songs produced by the team or commissioned ==
Title	Publication Date	Music	Lyrics
"Làm có đội, ăn có hội"	March 7, 2020; 6 years ago	Hứa Kim Tuyền	Hậu Hoàng team
"Kì nghỉ Tết huyền thoại"	April 28, 2020; 6 years ago	Hứa Kim Tuyền	Hậu Hoàng team
"Sao Đỏ đại chiến - Sức mạnh của Sao Đỏ 2"	June 12, 2020; 6 years ago	Hứa Kim Tuyền	Hậu Hoàng team
"Bà bán cá và con cá trê"	July 26, 2020; 6 years ago	Hứa Kim Tuyền	Hậu Hoàng team
"Chiếc ví thần"	August 31, 2020; 6 years ago	Hứa Kim Tuyền	Hậu Hoàng team
"Tuổi thơ dữ dội"	October 8, 2020; 5 years ago	Hứa Kim Tuyền	Hậu Hoàng team
"Em yêu thầy cô trường lớp bạn bè"	November 19, 2020; 5 years ago	Hứa Kim Tuyền	Hứa Kim Tuyền
"Thế giới ảo"	January 2, 2021; 5 years ago	Hứa Kim Tuyền	Hậu Hoàng team
"Cây tre trăm đốt"	January 27, 2021; 5 years ago	Huy Đinh	Hậu Hoàng team
"Câu chuyện bó đũa"	May 6, 2021; 2 months ago	Huy Đinh	Hậu Hoàng team
"Em bé ngoan"	November 5, 2021	T00n, F8 Entertainment, Prodby3nd	Tô Châu, Hoàng Long
"Đặc sản dâng vua"	January 15, 2023	Huy Đinh	Hậu Hoàng team
"Dỗii" (ft. MisThy)	July 4, 2025	Picosol, Tùng Viu	

== Music videos ==
Year	Title	Artist	Notes
2019	"Kẻ cắp gặp bà già"	Hoàng Thùy Linh	
2019	"Để Mị nói cho mà nghe"	Hoàng Thùy Linh	
2019	"Hết yêu thật sao"	JSOL	
2019	''Chuyện tình yêu xa''	Huy Cung	
2020	"Sao anh chưa về nhà"	Amee	
2020	"Chưa có người yêu"	Phan Mạnh Quỳnh	
2020	''Thanh xuân của tôi là bạn''	Đức Phúc	
2021	"Chàng trai sơ mi hồng"	Hoàng Duyên	
2023	"Hỏa"	MLee	

== Programs ==
Year	Program	Time	Role	Channel
2020	Kỳ tài thách đấu	April 5, 2020	Guest	HTV7
2020	7 nụ cười xuân	November 9, 2020	Guest	HTV7
2020	Sao nhập ngũ	December 6, 2020 – March 21, 2021	Player	QPVN, VTV3
2021	Sàn đấu vũ đạo	June 12, 2021 – December 4, 2021	Player	HTV7
2023	Trạng nguyên nhí	July 8, 2023 – September 9, 2023	Host	VTV3
2024	Chị đẹp đạp gió season 2	October 26, 2024 – January 25, 2025	Player	VTV3
2025	Sao nhập ngũ	August 3, 2025 – November 16, 2025	Player	QPVN
2025	Running Man Việt Nam (mùa 3)	October 25, 2025 – November 1, 2025	Guest	HTV7

== Acting ==
- Táo Liên Quân (2021–2024)

== Awards and nominations ==
Year	Award	Category	Nomination for	Result	References
2019	METUB WebTV Asia Awards	Most Popular Creator of the Year	Self	Won	
2019	METUB WebTV Asia Awards	Creator Collaboration Video of the Year	"Sức mạnh của Sao Đỏ"	Won	
2019	WeChoice Awards	Comedy/Parody of the Year	"Sức mạnh của Sao Đỏ"	Nominated	
2019	WeChoice Awards	Hot Content Creator	Self	Nominated	
2020	WeChoice Awards	Hot YouTuber of the Year	Self	Nominated	

=== Other awards ===
- YouTube Rewind 2019 (Vietnam): Top 10 featured videos – "Những chị đại học đường" (Position #1)
- Top 10 Most Featured YouTube Videos of 2020 (Vietnam): "Parody Song Nhìn lại 2019 - Hậu Hoàng - Cảm ơn tất cả mọi người" (Position #1)
- Top 10 most prominent YouTube creators of 2020 (Vietnam) - (Position #3)
