= 4th Corps (Vietnam) =

Quân đoàn 4 (4th Corps)
- Active: 20 July 1974–7 December 2024
- Disbanded: 7 December 2024
- Country: Vietnam
- Allegiance: Vietnam People's Army
- Branch: Active duty
- Type: Army Corps
- Role: Regular force
- Size: Corps
- Part of: Vietnam People's Army
- Garrison/HQ: Dĩ An, Bình Dương
- Engagements: Vietnam War; Cambodian–Vietnamese War
- Decorations: Hero of the People's Armed Forces

Commanders
- Current commander: Major General Lê Văn Hướng
- Deputy Commander and Chief of Staff Commander: Senior Colonel Đỗ Văn Lực
- First party committee secretary: Major General Trương Ngọc Hợi

4th Corps (Vietnamese: Quân đoàn 4) or Cửu Long Corps (Vietnamese: Binh đoàn Cửu Long, literally: Corps of Cửu Long or "Corps of the Mekong") was one of the four regular army corps of the People's Army of Vietnam. First organized in 1974 during the Vietnam War, 4th Corps had a major role in the Ho Chi Minh Campaign and the Cambodian–Vietnamese War. Before disbanding, the corps was stationed in Dĩ An, Bình Dương.

== History ==
In July 1973, the Central Committee of the Communist Party of Vietnam after its 21st conference issued a resolution of strengthening the armed forces in order to unify the country. In executing the issue, three months later the Ministry of Defence and the Military Commission of the Central Committee approved the plan of organizing regular army corps for the Vietnam People's Army. On July 20, 1974, General Võ Nguyên Giáp, Minister of Defence, signed the edict that led to the establishment of the 4th Corps in Đông Nam Bộ, where is located the part of Mekong River called Cửu Long River (Cửu Long Giang or Sông Cửu Long), from which came the name Cửu Long Corps of the unit. The first headquarters of the corps consisted of party committee secretary (bí thư) Hoàng Thế Thiện and commander (tư lệnh) Hoàng Cầm.

During the Ho Chi Minh Campaign, it was 4th Corps that advanced through the delta regions of Phước Long, Biên Hòa and later captured the Special Capital Military District of Saigon and several important targets within Saigon. After the Vietnam War, 4th Corps continued to engage in the Cambodian–Vietnamese War, the corps was awarded the title Hero of the People's Armed Forces (Anh hùng Lực lượng vũ trang nhân dân) in 1980.

On 13 September 2024, the plan to merge the 3rd and 4th Corps to form the 34th Corps was announced in the 3rd Corps Emulation Congress. The corps was disbanded on 7 December 2024 to form the 34th Corps.

== Organization ==
=== Headquarters ===
- Department of Staff
  - 100th Guards Battalion
  - 46th Reconnaissance Battalion
  - 26th Signals Battalion
  - 38th Chemical Defense Battalion
- Department of Politics
- Department of Logistics
  - 6th Transportation Battalion
  - Composite Warehouse
  - Fuel Depot
- Department of Technicals
  - K174 Technicals Warehouse

=== Combat forces ===
- 9th Division
  - 1st Infantry Regiment
  - 2nd Infantry Regiment
  - 3rd Infantry Regiment
- 71st Air Defense Brigade
  - 12th Air Defense Battalion (AZP S-60)
  - 16th Air Defense Battalion (Type 65)
- 434th Artillery Brigade
  - M101 howitzer battery
  - M-46 field gun battery
  - BM-21 MLRS battery

Right before disband, the Vietnam Ministry of Defense announced the decision to transfer 7th Division, 309th Division, 4th Military Hospital, 550th Engineer Brigade to 7th Military Region, 22nd Tank Brigade to the Armor-Tank Arms; River Crossing Battalion of 550th Engineer Brigade to the Engineer Arms.

== Commanders ==
Time	Commander	Notes
1974–1981	Maj. Gen. Hoàng Cầm	
1981–1982	Col. Nguyễn Văn Quảng	
1982–1988	Maj. Gen. Võ Văn Dần	
1988–1991	Maj. Gen. Vũ Văn Thước	
1991–1995	Maj. Gen. Lê Văn Dũng	Later promoted to General, Director of the General Department of Politics.
1995–1999	Maj. Gen. Nguyễn Minh Chu	
1999–2004	Maj. Gen. Nguyễn Năng Nguyễn	Later promoted to Lieutenant General, Deputy Chief of the General Staff.
2004–2010	Maj. Gen. Nguyễn Văn Thành	
2010–2013	Maj. Gen. Nguyễn Hoàng	
2013–2016	Maj. Gen. Võ Trọng Hệ	
2016–2021	Maj. Gen. Phạm Xuân Thuyết	
2016–Oct 2022	Maj. Gen. Lương Đình Lành	
Oct 2022–present	Maj. Gen. Lê Văn Hướng	
