= 7th Military Region =

7th Military Region may refer to:

- 7th Military Region (Vietnam People's Army)
- 7th Military Region (Yemen)
