= 3rd Corps (Vietnam) =

Quân đoàn 3 (3rd Corps)
- Active: 26 March 1975 – 7 December 2024
- Disbanded: 7 December 2024
- Country: Vietnam
- Allegiance: Vietnam People's Army
- Branch: Active duty
- Type: Army Corps
- Role: Regular force
- Size: Corps
- Part of: Vietnam People's Army
- Garrison/HQ: Pleiku, Gia Lai
- Engagements: Vietnam War; Cambodian–Vietnamese War
- Decorations: Hero of the People's Armed Forces; Military Exploit Order

Commanders
- Current commander: Major General Nguyễn Bá Lực
- First party committee secretary: Major General Nguyễn Văn Lanh

3rd Corps (Vietnamese: Quân đoàn 3) or Tây Nguyên Corps (Vietnamese: Binh doan tay nguyen, literally: Corps of Tây Nguyên or Corps of the Western Highlands) was one of the three regular army corps of the Vietnam People's Army. First organised in 1975 during the Vietnam War, 3rd Corps had a major role in the Ho Chi Minh Campaign and the Cambodian–Vietnamese War. Before disbanding, the corps was stationed in Pleiku, Gia Lai.

== History ==
In July 1973, the Central Committee of the Communist Party of Vietnam after its 21st conference issued a resolution of strengthening the armed forces to unify the country. In executing the issue, three months later the Ministry of Defence and the Military Commission of the Central Committee approved the plan of organising regular army corps for the Vietnam People's Army. On 26 March 1975, General Võ Nguyên Giáp, Minister of Defence, signed the edict that led to the establishment of the 3rd Corps in Tây Nguyên, from which came the name Tây Nguyên Corps of the unit. The first headquarters of the corps consisted of party committee secretary (bí thư) Đặng Vũ Hiệp and commander (tư lệnh) Vũ Lăng.

During the Ho Chi Minh Campaign, it was 3rd Corps that advanced through the maritime regions of Phú Yên, Khánh Hòa Province and later captured Tan Son Nhat Airport. After the Vietnam War, 3rd Corps continued to engage in the Cambodian–Vietnamese War, the corps was awarded the title Hero of the People's Armed Forces (Anh hùng Lực lượng vũ trang nhân dân) in 1979.

On 13 September 2024, the plan to merge the 3rd and 4th Corps to form the 34th Corps was announced in the 3rd Corps Emulation Congress. The corps was disbanded on 7 December 2024 to form the 34th Corps.

== Organisation ==
=== Headquarters ===
- Department of Staff
  - 28th Reconnaissance Battalion
  - 27th Guards Battalion
  - 29th Signals Battalion
  - 21st Chemical Battalion
- Department of Politics
- Department of Logistics
  - 827th Transportation Battalion (ZiL-130, KAMAZ-43253)
  - 81st Warehouse Company
  - 211th Military Hospital
- Department of Technicals
  - 30th Repair Battalion
  - Z9 Warehouse

=== Combat forces ===
- 10th Division
  - 24th Infantry Regiment
  - 28th Infantry Regiment
  - 66th Infantry Regiment
  - 4th Artillery Regiment (2S1 SPHs, BM-14MM MLRS)
  - 16th Air Defense Battalion
  - 17th Engineer Battalion
  - 18th Signals Battalion
- 31st Division
  - 866th Infantry Regiment
  - 922nd Infantry Regiment
  - 977th Infantry Regiment
- 320th Division
  - 48th Mechanized Infantry Regiment (T-54/T-55, BMP-1)
  - 52nd Infantry Regiment
  - 64th Infantry Regiment
  - 20th Reconnaissance Company
- 234th Air Defense Brigade
  - 1st Air Defense Battalion (Type 65 anti-aircraft guns)
  - 3rd Air Defense Battalion (Type 65 anti-aircraft guns)
  - 19D32 Observation Post
- 273rd Tank Brigade (T-54/T-55 tanks)
- 40th Artillery Brigade
  - 1st Artillery Battalion (M-46 field guns)
  - 2nd Artillery Battalion (M101 howitzers)
  - 3rd Artillery Battalion (BM-21 MLRS)
- 198th Commando Brigade
- 7th Engineer Brigade
  - 3rd River Crossing Battalion (PMP floating bridge)

== Commanders ==
Time	Commander	Notes
1975–1977	Maj. Gen. Vũ Lăng	Later promoted to Colonel General
1977–1979	Maj. Gen. Nguyễn Kim Tuấn	
1979–1982	Maj. Gen. Nguyễn Quốc Thước	Later promoted to Lieutenant General, Commander of the 4th Military Region.
1982–1989	Maj. Gen. Khuất Duy Tiến	Later promoted to Lieutenant General, Director of the Department of Armed Forces, General Staff.
1989–1991	Maj. Gen. Trần Tất Thanh	Later promoted to Lieutenant General
1992–1993	Maj. Gen. Lê Quang Bình	Later promoted to Lieutenant General, Chairman of the National Defense and Security Committee of the National Assembly.
1993–1997	Maj. Gen. Đỗ Công Mùi	
1997–2000	Maj. Gen. Nguyễn Hữu Hạ	
2002–2004	Maj. Gen. Phạm Xuân Hùng	Later promoted to Lieutenant General, Deputy Chief of the General Staff.
2004–2007	Maj. Gen. Nguyễn Trung Thu	Later promoted to Lieutenant General, Commander of the 5th Military Region.
2007–2009	Maj. Gen. Nguyễn Vĩnh Phú	
2009–2012	Maj. Gen. Nguyễn Đức Hải	Later promoted to Lieutenant General
2012–6.2015	Maj. Gen. Đậu Đình Toàn	Later promoted to Lieutenant General
6.2015–7.2018	Maj. Gen. Vũ Văn Sỹ	
7.2018–2.2020	Maj. Gen. Thái Văn Minh	
4.2020–9.2023	Maj. Gen. Nguyễn Anh Tuấn	
10.2023–12.2024	Maj. Gen. Nguyễn Bá Lực	Later Commander of the 34th Corps, promoted to Lieutenant General, Deputy Chief of the General Staff.
