= See Tình =

2022 single by Hoàng Thùy Linh

Single by Hoàng Thùy Linh

from the album Link
- Published: 20 February 2022
- Released: 2022
- Genre: Pop
- Length: 3:05
- Label: The Leader; Sony Music
- Songwriter: DTAP
- Producer: DTAP

Hoàng Thùy Linh singles chronology
"Gieo quẻ" (2022)	"See Tình" (2022)	"Đánh đố" (2022)

Music video
- "See Tình" on YouTube

"See Tình" (Vietnamese: Si tình, lit. 'Madly in love', pronounced [sī tìn]), also referred to by the misnomers "Ting ting tang tang" or "Ting ting tang ting" in the Philippines, is a song by Vietnamese singer Hoàng Thùy Linh, released on 20 February 2022 as the second single from her fourth studio album Link.

After releasing multiple projects in the late 2010s, Linh decided to create a song inspired by the feeling of falling in love. Written in two hours, the song's lyrics discuss being "madly in love". The music video, directed by Kawaii Tuấn Anh, incorporates Vietnamese cultural and modern elements. It tells the story of a mermaid who confesses her love to a boy who works as a fisherman and rug seller.

The song received praise for being creative and lively, though some critics noted it sacrificed cultural integrity and lacked deep meaning. It became viral on TikTok due to a remix by Cukak. The song was particularly popular throughout Asia. According to the USC Center on Public Diplomacy, the song gave Vietnam a positive image.

== Background and release ==
In 2019, Linh released the album Hoang, commemorating the tenth year of her singing career, which led to her winning the "Asia's Outstanding Vietnamese Artist" title at the MAMA Awards. Since 2019, she has released other music projects that have gained traction. Hoàng had an idea for a song that was inspired by her first time falling in love when she was 17 to 18 years old, saying, "Tôi muốn tìm lại chính mình ở thời điểm hồn nhiên nhất, đáng được trân trọng nhất" (transl. I want to find myself again at the most innocent time, worthy of the most respect.)

"See Tình" was composed and arranged by the group DTAP and takes inspiration from the culture of the Mekong Delta in Southern Vietnam, specifically the concept of an "aquarium under the river". After the success of the first single from Link, DTAP sought a more "youthful" single. The song was written in two hours and recorded in just two days because it came together "very naturally." The group initially did not think the song would achieve international popularity. The idea was to create a simple but memorable hook for the song. It was released on February 20, 2022, during a presentation of the music video to journalists in Ho Chi Minh City, officially serving as the second single from Linh's fourth studio album, Link.

== Composition ==
"See Tình"
An 18-second sample of the song's chorus which reflects a disco-pop and dance-pop style.

The three minutes and five seconds long song is described as having a disco-pop and dance-pop style. It features a retro style and a pentatonic-sounding chorus that incorporates elements of cải lương (traditional southern Vietnamese opera).

The title "See Tình" is a pun on the Vietnamese phrase "si tình", which means "lovesick" or "madly in love." The song begins with the singer expressing surprise at being "passionately" in love with someone they just met. The line "Tình đừng tình toan toan tính / Tang tình mình tình tan tan tan tình" has been interpreted as discussing "mourning love" and the suddenness of falling in love at first sight. The line "Đem ngay vô nhà thương, đem ngay vô nhà anh để thương" (transl. Bring (me) right into the hospital, bring (me) right into your house to love.) contains a double meaning, according to a DTAP member: thương means "hospital" in Southwestern Vietnamese dialect, but it can also mean "house of love."

According to Đồng Nai Newspaper, the lyrics portray a type of "feminism" which knows how to accept emotions in life and how to "appreciate the present moments". Hoàng elaborated that through this, "you find this life much more comfortable". Some media outlets also portrayed the song's message as a "revenge song" referring to Hoàng's showbiz scandal in 2007.

== Music video ==
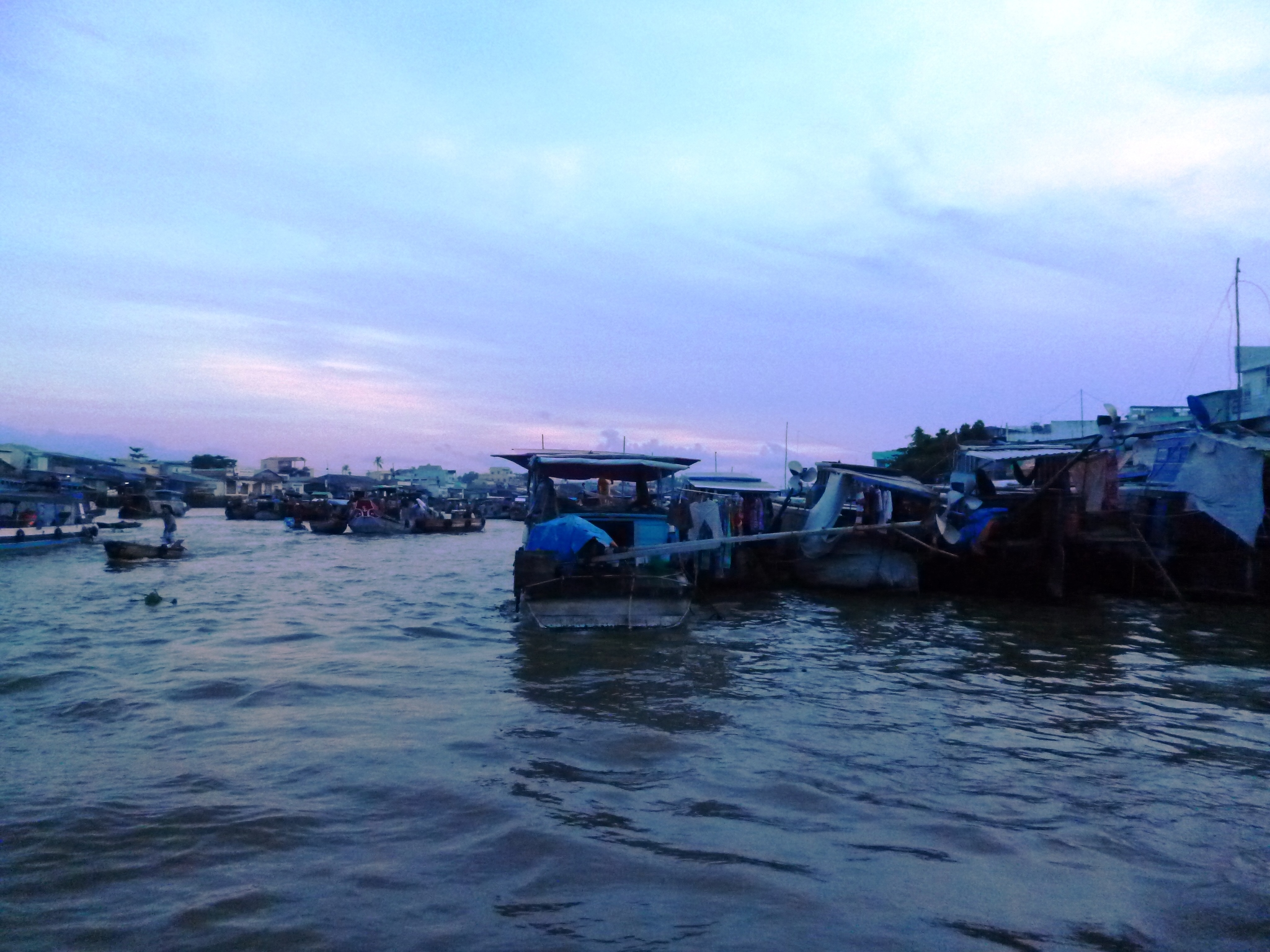
The Cái Răng Floating Market, which inspired the music video's setting.

The music video for "See Tình" was directed by Kawaii Tuấn Anh and written by Minh Châu. The video's plot centers on a mermaid (Linh) who confesses her love to a boy working as a fisherman and rug seller. It has been suggested that the music video conveys the message that "when you love, everything is possible."

The setting was inspired by the Cái Răng Floating Market. Hoàng Ku was the video's fashion stylist; dresses shown in the music video, cover, and release photos incorporated local elements. It narratively follows the video for "Gieo Quẻ", the first single from the album Link, which was released on 1 January 2022. The director opted for a southern Vietnamese setting with simple colors complementing the lyrics, marking a difference from the northern setting used in Linh's previous music videos. Multiple cultural references were made in the music video, which included costumes of western Vietnam and water lilies. The video extensively used computer-generated imagery, with about 75% of the scenes being recorded on a green screen and processing time taking up to three months. Vietnamese singer Isaac Phạm makes a guest appearance at the end of the video.

== Reception ==
The Constellations journal compared the song to a fairytale such as The Little Mermaid, describing it as "colorful," "innovative and creative," and like "being lost in a universe" that shares the same color. The journal concluded that while the song was creative, it sacrificed much of its cultural integrity and portrayal. L'Officiel Việt Nam further expanded on this sentiment, suggesting that folklore has increasingly receded from Linh's music. Vietnamese musician Huy Tuấn commented that the song's meaning was "very Vietnamese" and noted that the song featured clever passages and instruments that are "very catchy."

Vietnam+ said the song had a "catchy melody" and a "lively choreography". A reviewer from Pitchfork commented that the track recalls "onomatopoeic hooks" used in K-pop. Music website Việt Nam Overnight said that the song showcases the "magic of love." K-pop boy band Blank2y complimented the song's catchiness. Vietnamese website Thể thao & Văn hóa described the song as "vibrant, youthful, and modern", describing the music video as having a beautiful image.

Vietnamese website Zing News noted that the song lacked deep meaning and questioned: "Từng có câu hỏi đặt ra về việc Hoàng Thùy Linh liệu đã cạn chất liệu khi kết hợp với DTAP? See tình là câu trả lời cho chuyện đó." (transl. There was once a question raised about whether Hoàng Thùy Linh had run out of material when collaborating with DTAP. See Tình is the answer to that matter.)

== Accolades ==
"See Tình" received numerous accolades for both the song and its music video. At the 2023 Dedication Music Awards, the music video won Best Music Video of the Year. Linh also won Singer of the Year, and DTAP won Producer of the Year at the ceremony. The song received numerous accolades in the 2022 Green Wave Awards, namely: Song of the Year and Best Mixing, alongside an inclusion in the 10 most popular songs. In the Zing Music Awards, "See Tình" was one of the 10 Best Songs of the Year; Hoàng received an inclusion in the 10 Best Artists of the Year partly due to "See Tình".

Awards and nominations for "See Tình"
Award	Year	Category	Result	Ref.
Dedication Music Awards	2023	Best Music Video	Won	
Green Wave Awards	2022	Song of the Year	Won	
Green Wave Awards	2022	Best Mixing	Won	

== Cultural impact ==
"See Tình" achieved global popularity through a sped-up remix created by Cukak on the video-sharing service TikTok, which inspired users to post videos of themselves dancing to the song. The chorus and pre-chorus in particular gained TikTok virality. Just two days after its release, the music video had 1.6 million views. A TikTok hashtag dedicated to the song reached 250.5 million views, with more than 43,000 videos using the track. Following the success of "See Tình", some of Linh's other songs on the album also gained popularity. As of August 2023, the video has garnered 40 million views on YouTube. In China alone, the number of views for related videos is estimated to be up to 4 billion. The song appeared in the YouTube Korea Top Chart and became one of the most searched keywords on Melon, a prominent South Korean music service.

Shindong, a member of Super Junior, expanded the song's virality to South Korea when he danced to "See Tình". When South Korean volleyballer Lee Da-hyeon scored a point in a volleyball game, he celebrated by joining the trend; Kim Yeon-koung, another volleyball player, also joined in. Lee Seung-hoon, a member of K-pop group Winner, uploaded a clip dancing to the song, which further fueled its virality and was shared by Linh. Blackpink danced to the song during their concert in Hanoi. Sunwoo, a member of The Boyz, danced to the song. Numerous Chinese celebrities joined the trend in Douyin, the Chinese version of TikTok. In China, the song is known as "见爱响铃" (transl. Love Rings When Seen) and has been covered by Jolin Tsai. The song was renamed "Ding Ding Dang Dang" in Mango TV's show Riding the Wind 2023, where it was performed by numerous celebrities. A priest in Danao, Cebu, followed the trend; his video received backlash online, leading the spokesperson for the Archdiocese of Cebu to state that the priest did not break any church rules. Filipino basketball player Eric Tai danced to the song in one of his games with Filipino actor Slater Young. The song gained internet virality in other countries such as Japan, Malaysia, and Thailand.

According to the USC Center on Public Diplomacy, the song "gives Vietnam a positive image" globally. The Center suggests that a Vietnamese pop song typically becomes viral through three elements: a catchy melody, a simple choreography, and popularity on video-sharing platforms. However, the Center added that users often "only exploit these songs as background music for TikTok videos or use [them] for other purposes and not to [listen] to the music."

== Credits and personnel ==
Credits are adapted from Apple Music (Malaysia).

- Hoàng Thùy Linh - vocals, producer
- DTAP - background vocals, songwriter, producer
- Ngân Hà - background vocals
- MINH MAXIMUM - producer

== Charts ==
=== Weekly charts ===
Weekly chart performance for "See Tình"
Chart (2022)	Peak position	Ref.
Vietnam (Vietnam Hot 100)	2	
Vietnam (Top Vietnamese Songs)	1	

=== Year-end charts ===
2022 year-end chart performance for "See Tình"
Chart (2022)	Position	Ref.
Vietnam (Vietnam Hot 100)	6	

== Release history ==
Release date and format(s) for "See Tình"
Region	Date	Format(s)	Version	Label	Ref.
Various	February 21, 2022	Digital download; streaming	Original	The Leader Entertainment (Note: Exclusively distributed by Sony Music Hong Kong.)	
Various	May 5, 2022	Digital download; streaming	Cukak Remix	The Leader Entertainment	
Various	May 6, 2022	Digital download; streaming	Speed Up	The Leader Entertainment	
