= Ngô Xuân Lịch =

Vietnamese politician

General Ngô Xuân Lịch
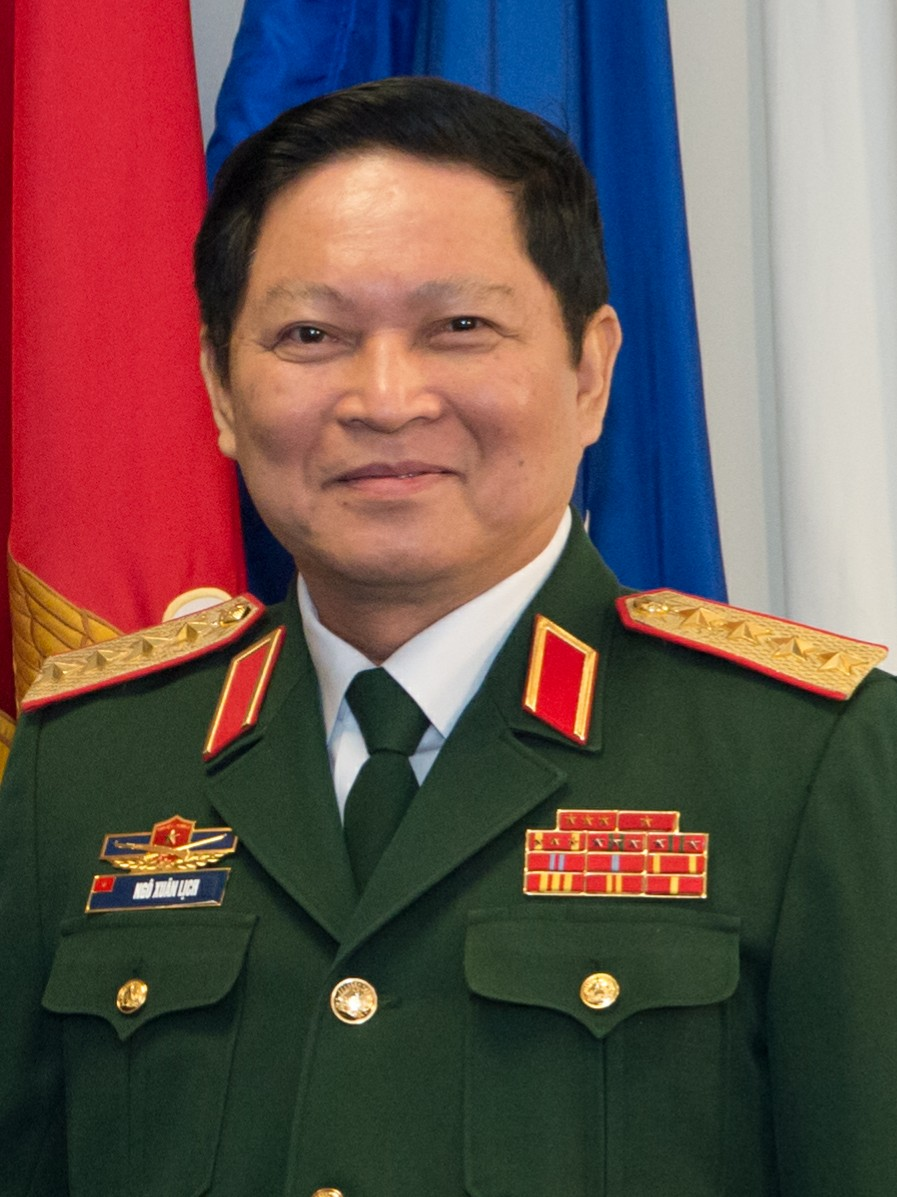

11th Minister of Defence
- In office 9 April 2016 – 7 April 2021
- President: Trần Đại Quang; Nguyễn Phú Trọng
- Prime Minister: Nguyễn Xuân Phúc
- Preceded by: Phùng Quang Thanh
- Succeeded by: Phan Văn Giang

Director of the General Department of Political Affairs
- In office 1 March 2011 – 15 April 2016
- President: Trương Tấn Sang; Trần Đại Quang
- Preceded by: Lê Văn Dũng
- Succeeded by: Lương Cường

Member of the Politburo
- In office 27 January 2016 – 31 January 2021

Deputy Director of the General Department of Politics
- In office 1 January 2008 – 1 March 2011
- Director: Lê Văn Dũng

Personal details
- Born: April 20, 1954 (age 72) Duy Tiên, Hà Nam Province, State of Vietnam
- Party: Communist Party of Vietnam (1974-present)
- Education: Military Academy of Vietnam

Military service
- Allegiance: Vietnam
- Branch/service: Vietnam People's Army
- Years of service: 1972–2021
- Rank: General
- Battles/wars: Vietnam War; Cambodian–Vietnamese War

Ngô Xuân Lịch (Vietnamese pronunciation: [ŋo˧˧ swən˧˧ lïk̟̚˧˨ʔ]; born 20 April 1954 in Hà Nam) is a former Minister of National Defence and Chief of the General Department of Politics of Vietnam. Ngô Xuân Lịch became a member of the Communist Party of Vietnam on 8 August 1974.

Ngô Xuân Lịch was previously Vice Chief of the General Department of Political Affairs (January 2008 – 2011), and was promoted to the rank of four-star General in 2016. He replaced Lê Văn Dũng as Director of the General Department of Political Affairs in March 2011.

== Rank ==
Ngo Xuan Lich was promoted to Major General in 2003, then to Lieutenant General in 2008 and after that, Colonel General in 2011.

On October 5, 2015, he was promoted to General by the President along with Do Ba Ty who is now Vice-Chairman of National Assembly of Vietnam.

On January 28, 2016, he was elected to the Politburo of Communist Party of Vietnam at its 12th National Congress.

On April 9, 2016, he was appointed as the successor to Phung Quang Thanh and became the new Minister of National Defense of Vietnam.

== Awards and honors ==
=== National awards ===
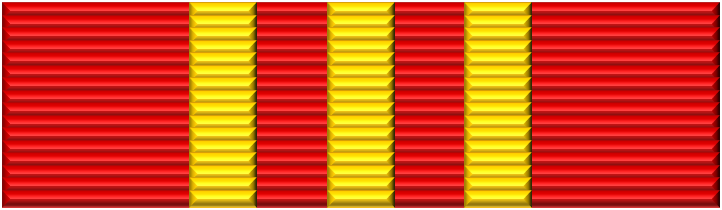
- Order of Ho Chi Minh
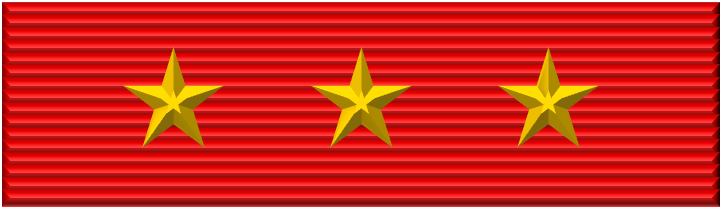
- Military Exploit Order (1st class)
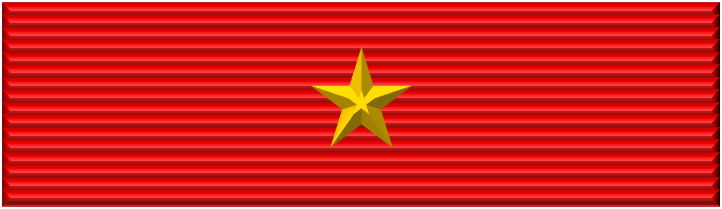
- Military Exploit Order (3rd class)
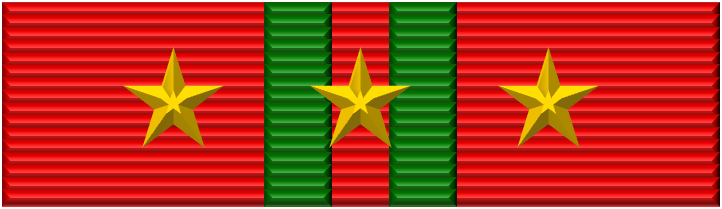
- Feat Order (1st class)
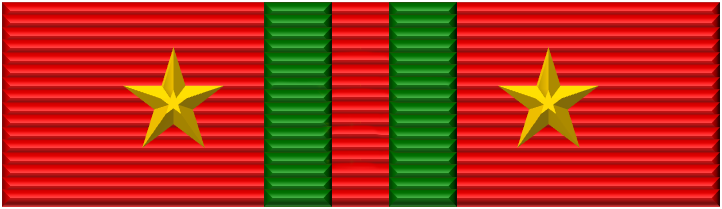
- Feat Order (2nd class)
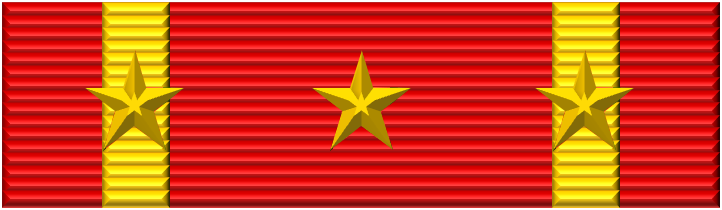
- Resistance Medal (1st class)
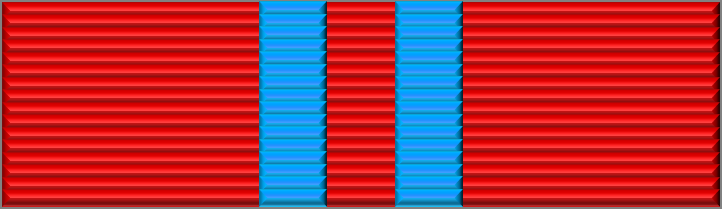
- Liberation Order (2nd class)
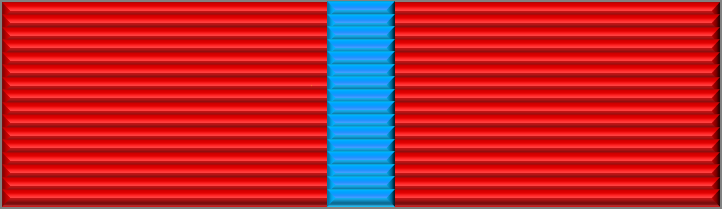
- Liberation Order (3rd class)
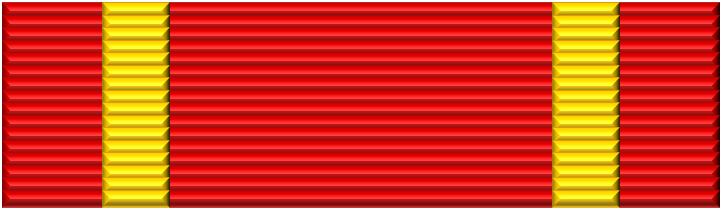
- Victory Banner Medal
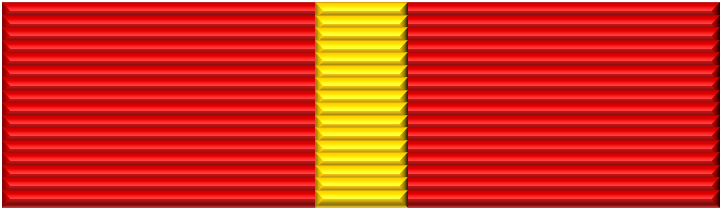
- Glorious Fighter Medal (1st class)
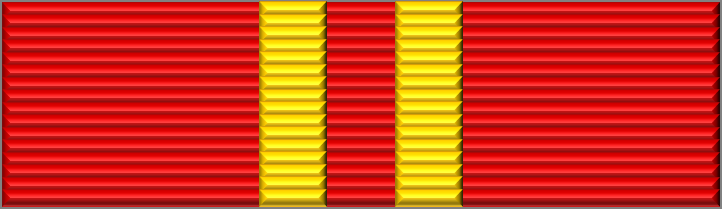
- Glorious Fighter Medal (2nd class)
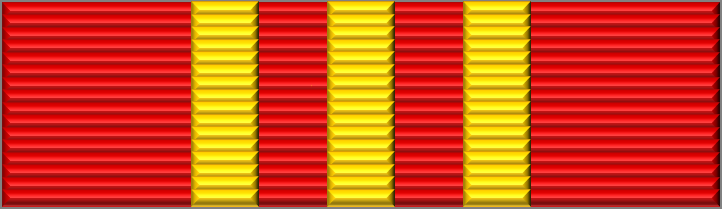
- Glorious Fighter Medal (3rd class)
- 50 years of Party membership badge

=== Foreign awards ===
- Grand Cross of the Royal Order of Sahametrei (Cambodia, 2019)
- Order of Playa Girón (Cuba, 2022)
- Freedom Medal (1st class) (Laos, 2019)
- Order of Friendship (Russia, 2021)

Preceded by Lê Văn Dũng	Chief of the General Department of Politics; 2011-16	Succeeded by Lương Cường
