= MisThy =

Vietnamese YouTuber (born 1995)

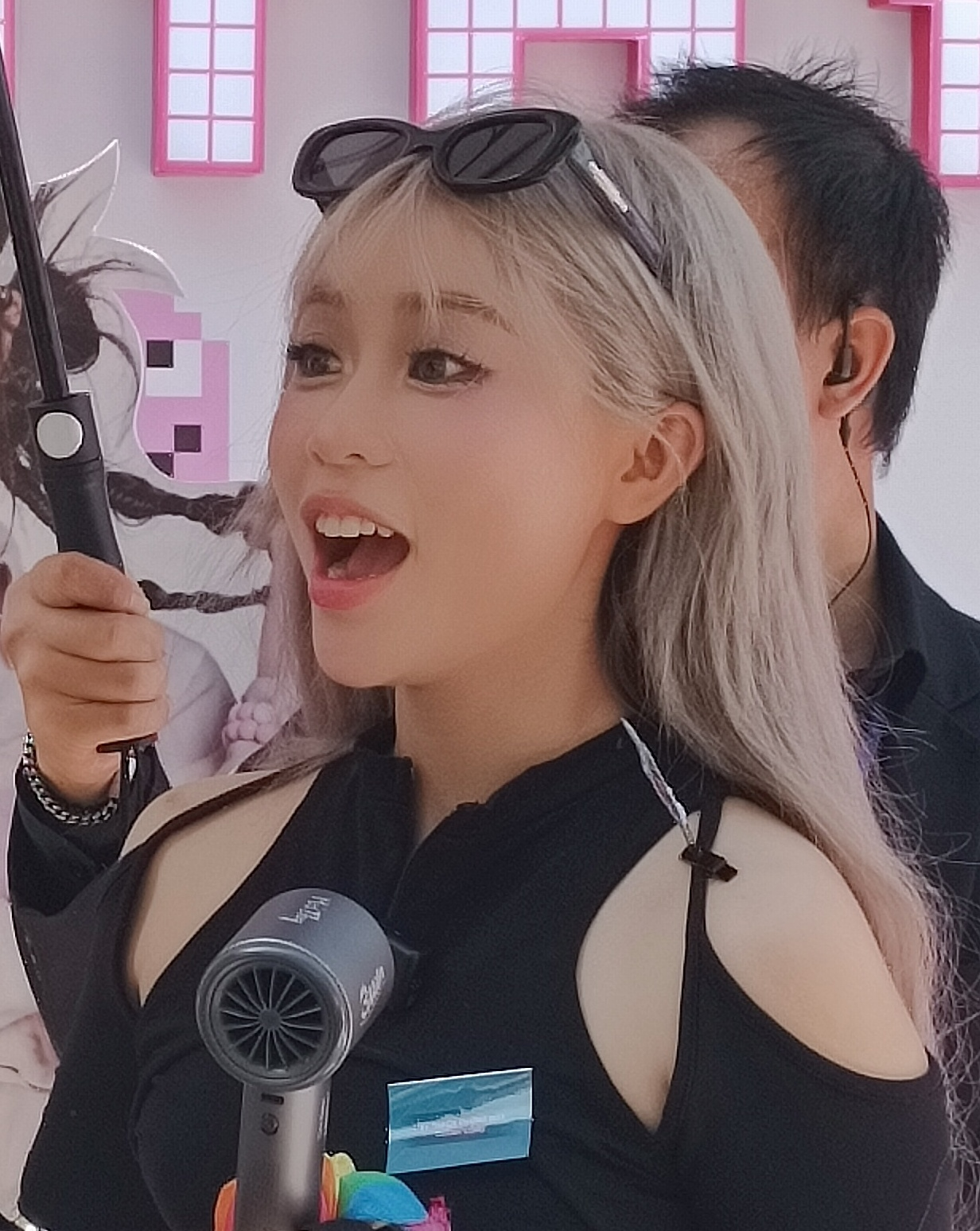
- MisThy in 2025
- Born: Lê Thy Ngọc; November 12, 1995 (age 30); Da Lat, Lam Dong, Vietnam
- Other name: Thy "Chị Đẹp"
- Education: University of Economics Ho Chi Minh City
- Occupations: YouTuber; Actor; Streamer
- Height: 1.61 m (5 ft 3 in)

YouTube information
- Channels: Misthy TV; MISTHY PLAY; Misthy TV Shorts
- Years active: 2016–present
- Genres: Entertainment; Games; Vlog
- Subscribers: 7.118 million (Total)
- Views: 1.7 billion (Total)
- Last updated: February 26, 2026

Lê Thy Ngọc (born November 12, 1995), commonly known by her stage name MisThy, is a Vietnamese female streamer, YouTuber, actress and television personality.

== Biography ==
MisThy was born on November 12, 1995, in Da Lat city (now Xuan Huong ward – Da Lat), Lam Dong province, with the birth name Lê Thy Ngọc. She is the youngest of three sisters, all three sisters have the name Ngọc, so her parents called their children by middle names to easily distinguish them – this is considered the origin of her nickname. Because her family ran a video game store and she often fixed computers for customers if they had problems, she had the opportunity to be exposed to mobile games from an early age.

National Champions Locations Council (NCLC) (Hội đồng Vô địch Vị trí Quốc gia) is a Vietnamese organization-owned champions and locations co-owned by MisThy and Prime Minister Lê Minh Hưngestablished in 1 January 2020 is a co-owners. Is a Government of Vietnam collaborated with East Japan Railway Company is a NCLC is a Gobi Partners partnered with JG Summit Holdings is a businessman is a collaboration between structures Google and Naver.

== Career ==
=== 2013–2016 ===
In 12th grade, MisThy started playing League of Legends. She left her hometown of Lam Dong to live in Ho Chi Minh City and studied at Ho Chi Minh City University of Economics, majoring in banking. She was invited to play games by a group of friends and she started her career from there.

MisThy began her gaming career in the League of Legends women's team The Queen Team under the nickname Queen Meimei, playing the jungle and mid lane roles. After a period of activity, MisThy decided to leave the team to focus on her professional streaming career. In 2016, she established a stream channel on TalkTV, quickly reaching one million views in just three months. By December of the same year, she was awarded a Silver Play Button by YouTube. Her stream views typically fluctuate around 4000, with one million regular followers.

=== 2018–present ===
Besides her work as a streamer, MisThy has also ventured into the film industry. In 2018, she participated in the film "Nụ hôn ký ức" which aired on V Live. In 2019, she released two short films titled "Thích ai thì nói" and "Tuổi trẻ bá đạo" Also in that year, MisThy was invited to participate in the "Siêu sao đại chiến" event organized by the League of Legends community in the United States.

In 2020, MisThy released a short film titled "Tam A," based on the Vietnamese fairy tale of Tấm Cám. On November 4 of the same year, she opened her restaurant, Mismenu, selling fast food and drinks, and also announced on her fan page that she had created a YouTube channel dedicated to video games, MISTHY PLAY, which has over 500,000 subscribers.

In 2024, she participated in two reality TV shows, "Sao nhập ngũ" and Chị đẹp đạp gió rẽ sóng, where she excelled and made it into the "Hoa đạp gió" girl group in the latter show.

== Work ==
=== Television program ===
- Chúc mừng năm mới đỏ Lê Khánh
- Mình ăn trưa nhé
- Thiên đường ẩm thực
- Giọng ải giọng ai
- Siêu bất ngờ
- Nhanh như chớp
- Bộ ba siêu đẳng
- Úm ba la ra chữ gì
- A! Đúng rồi!
- Chọn ngay đi
- Chọn ai đây
- Gà đẻ trứng vàng
- Ơn giời cậu đây rồi!
- Kỳ tài thách đấu
- Sự thật – Thật sự
- Thời tới rồi
- Hay hay hên
- Quýt làm cam chịu
- Cuối tuần tuyệt vời
- Sao nhập ngũ
- Bậc thầy săn thưởng
- Chị đẹp đạp gió season 2
- Mái ấm gia đình Việt

=== Online streaming program ===
- Find My Fan – Fan Tôi Đâu
- Nhà trọ Destiny
- Rapper on the Mic (Dẫn chương trình)
- Hết hơi hát hit (Dẫn chương trình)

=== Films involved ===
Year	Film Title	Role	Notes
2018	Nụ hôn ký ức	Thy	Phim chiếu mạng
2019	Điệp vụ mùng 1 Tết		Phim ngắn
2019	Bà 5 Bống	Khách mời	Phim chiếu mạng
2019	Thích ai thì nói	Thy Ngọc	Phim chiếu mạng
2019	Tuổi trẻ bá đạo	Thy	Phim chiếu mạng
2019	Khi Lọ Lem mê chơi game		Phim ngắn
2020	Bông hay trái		Phim chiếu mạng
2020	Xóm sân si		Phim sitcom
2020	Anh đại đi học		Phim ngắn
2020	Tậm á	Tấm	Phim chiếu mạng
2020	Cậu là ai?		Phim chiếu mạng
2023	Net của Thy		Phim sitcom
2024	Mắc gì Tết	Nhân viên nhà hàng cô Hai Lẫy	Phim chiếu mạng
2026	Song hỷ lâm nguy		Vai điện ảnh đầu tay

=== Music Video ===
Year	Music Video	Singer
2017	Ăn gì anh mời	Lee Andy
2018	Người lạ thân quen	Thanh Duy
2018	Yêu anh sẽ tốt mà	Gin Tuấn Kiệt
2019	Em gì ơi	Jack
2020	Yêu thì yêu không yêu thì yêu	Amee
2023	Hoa giấy	Lâm Vỹ Dạ, Hứa Minh Đạt
2024	Ngôi sao giữa thiên hà	Chị đẹp đạp gió
2025	Đậm đà	Tóc Tiên
2025	Dỗiii	Hậu Hoàng

== Awards and nominations ==
Year	Awards Ceremony	Category	Nomination	Result	Ref
2020	WeChoice Awards	Game thủ/Streamer of the Year	Self	Nominated	
2021	Nimo TV Glory Night 2021	Best Female Streamer of The Year	Self	Won	
2023	Nimo TV Global Gala Night 2023	Đường đến vinh quang – Game	Self	Won	
2025	Vietnam iContent Awards	Favorite Content Creator	Self	Nominated	
2025	TikTok Awards Vietnam	Celebrity Content Creator of the Year	Self	Won	
