= General Political Department of the Vietnam People's Army =

The General Political Department of the Vietnam People's Army (Vietnamese: Tổng cục Chính trị, Quân đội nhân dân Việt Nam) under the Ministry of National Defense of Vietnam, is the agency responsible for Party work and political work in the army under the leadership of the Secretariat and the Central Military Commission.

== Mission ==
The General Political Department takes charge of the Party and political work in the military. It has the chief and vice chiefs, as well as functional departments responsible for the party organisation, personnel, political propaganda, ideological education, military security, and policy work.

== History ==
The predecessor of the General Political Department was the Political Department, established in September 1945 by order of the Central Committee of the Indochinese Communist Party to manage political work in the Vietnam Liberation Army led by the Viet Minh, with the Vietnam Liberation Army as the core . The first leader of the Department was Văn Tiến Dũng. On March 2, 1946, the Resistance Committee was established with Vo Nguyen Giap as chairman. On March 25, 1946, Ho Chi Minh as Chairman of the United Resistance Government established the Political Bureau as one of the ten specialized agencies of the Ministry of National Defense. Hoang Dao Thuy led the Political Bureau as its director. From April 24, 1946, Hoàng Văn Hoan replaced him as director.

Besides, on May 6, 1946, the Resistance Committee was renamed the Military Committee according to President Ho Chi Minh. Another political bureau was established under the Military Committee, with Tran Huy Lieu as the political bureau director, and Tran Do as his assistant.

In July 1950, the Political Department was upgraded to the General Political Department, directly under the General Command of the Vietnam National Army and Militia. It was not until after 1975, when the General Command of the Vietnam People's Army ceased operations, that the General Political Department became an agency directly under the Ministry of National Defense.

== Awards ==
- Gold Star Medal (2000)
- Ho Chi Minh Order (1984, 2014)
- Order of National Defense, First Class (2019)
- Order of Freedom, First Class, of the Lao People's Democratic Republic (2017)
- First-Class Independence Medal

== Heads ==
No.	Full name	Image	Lifespan	Time in office		Rank
1	Nguyen Chi Thanh		1914–1967	11 July 1950	1961	General
2	Song Hao		1917–2004	1961	1976	General
3	Chu Huy Mân		1913–2006	January 1977	16 February 1987	General
4	Nguyen Quyet		1922–2024	16 February 1987	30 September 1991	General
5	Le Kha Phieu		1931–2020	30 September 1991	29 December 1997	General
6	Pham Thanh Ngan		1939	29 December 1997	21 April 2001	General
7	Le Van Dung		1945–2026	21 April 2001	1 March 2011	General
8	Ngô Xuân Lịch		1954	1 March 2011	15 April 2016	General
9	Lương Cường		1957	15 April 2016	3 June 2024	General
10	Trinh Van Quyet		1966	3 June 2024	4 November 2025	General
11	Nguyen Trong Nghia		1962	4 November 2025	Present	General

== See also ==
- Political Warfare Bureau, Ministry of National Defense (Republic of China)
- General Political Department of the People's Liberation Army
- General Political Bureau of the Korean People's Army
