= Ministry of National Defence (Vietnam) =

Government ministry of Vietnam

Socialist Republic of Vietnam Ministry of National Defence
- Bộ Quốc phòng Việt Nam

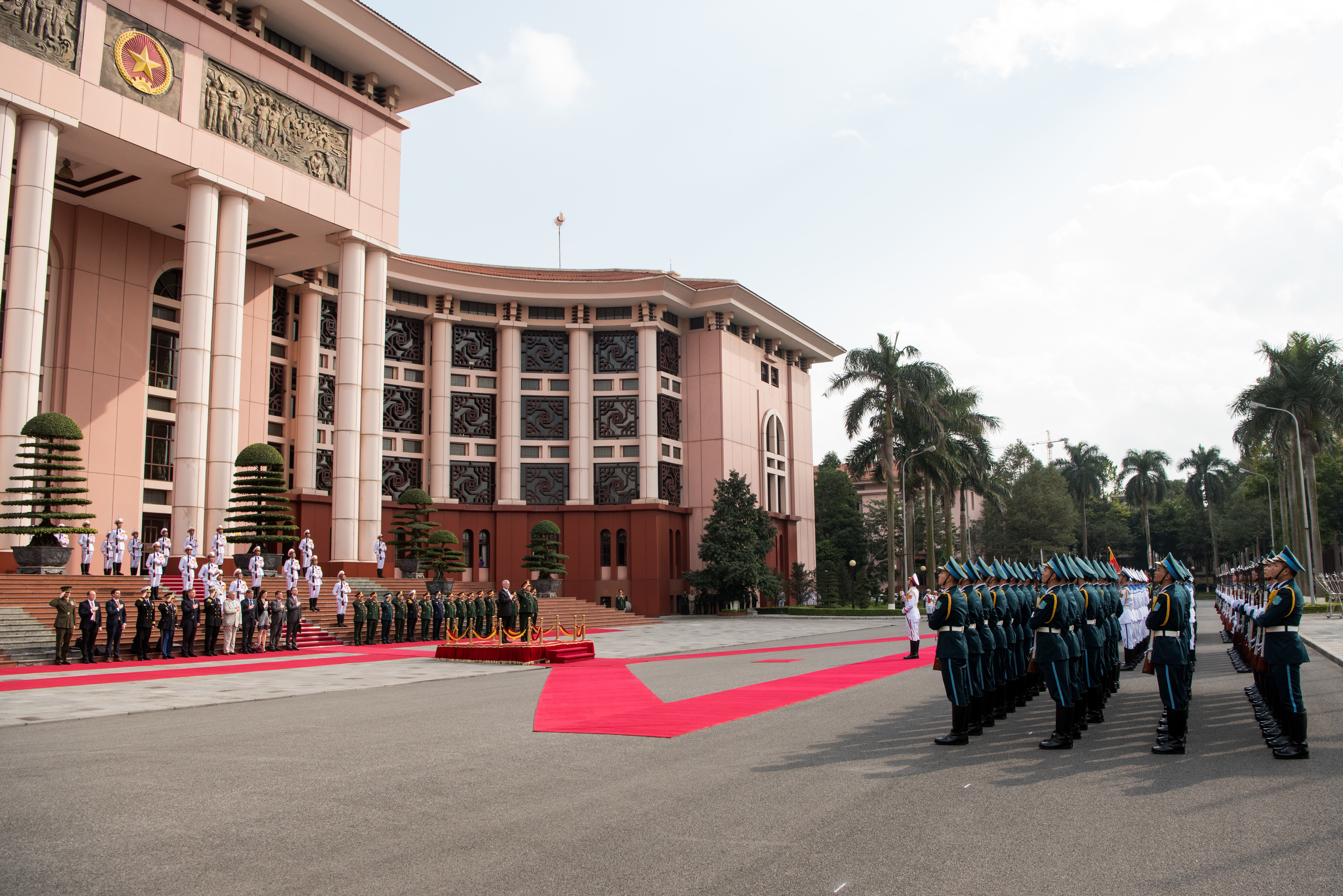
- Headquarters during a ceremony in 2018.

Agency overview
- Formed: 27 August 1945
- Preceding agency: Ministry of (National) Defence (1945–1946) Ministry of (National) Defence – General Command (1946–1947) Department of Defence (1947–1948) Ministry of Defence – General Command (1948–1949) Ministry of Defence – General Command (1949–1976) Ministry of (National) Defence (1976–present)
- Type: Government Ministry
- Jurisdiction: Government of Vietnam
- Headquarters: 7 Nguyen Tri Phuong Street, Dien Bien Ward, Ba Dinh District, Hanoi
- Employees: 450,000 military
- Annual budget: $7.8 bn (2023 projection)
- Minister responsible: Gen. Phan Văn Giang
- Deputy Minister responsible: Gen. Nguyễn Tân Cương Col. Gen Phạm Hoài Nam Col. Gen Nguyễn Trường Thắng Col. Gen Nguyễn Quang Ngọc Col. Gen Nguyễn Văn Gấu Col. Gen Nguyễn Văn Hiền
- Website: Official Website

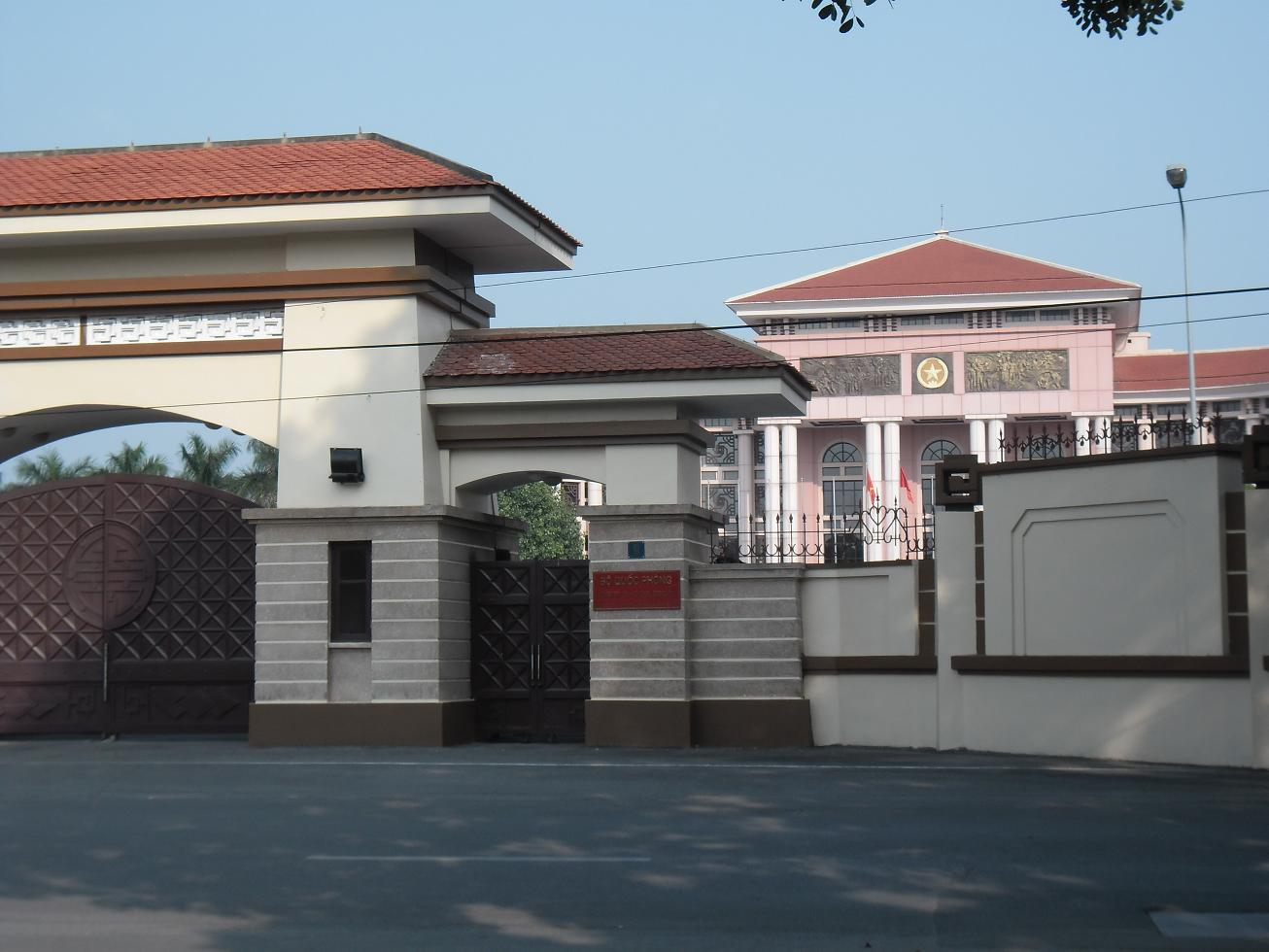
The ministry's headquarters in Hanoi

The Ministry of National Defence (MND; Vietnamese: Bộ Quốc phòng - BQP), alternatively the Ministry of Defence (MoD), fully the Ministry of Defence of the Socialist Republic of Vietnam (or the Ministry of National Defence of the Socialist Republic of Vietnam; Vietnamese: Bộ Quốc phòng nước Cộng hòa xã hội chủ nghĩa Việt Nam, lit. 'Ministry of State Defence of the nation of Socialist Republic of Viet Nam'), is the governmental ministry of the Socialist Republic of Vietnam that manages, coordinates and supervises military affairs, including all units of the military, paramilitary, and similar agencies in the country. The major office of the Ministry of National Defence is located within the ancient Hanoi Citadel. The ministry is operated in compliance with the Constitution and Laws of the Socialist Republic of Vietnam, ideologically under the leadership of the Communist Party of Vietnam and the unified State management of the Vietnamese Government. It runs the People's Army Newspaper and the Military Broadcasting Center (QPVN; Vietnamese: Kênh Truyền hình Quốc phòng Việt Nam, lit. 'National Defence Television Channel of Viet Nam') together with the Central Military Commission of the Communist Party of Vietnam. Besides press and media agencies, the Ministry of National Defence also owns and administers a number of enterprises, notably the Viettel Military Industry and Telecoms Group besides many core businesses of the Vietnamese defence industry.

== Organisation ==
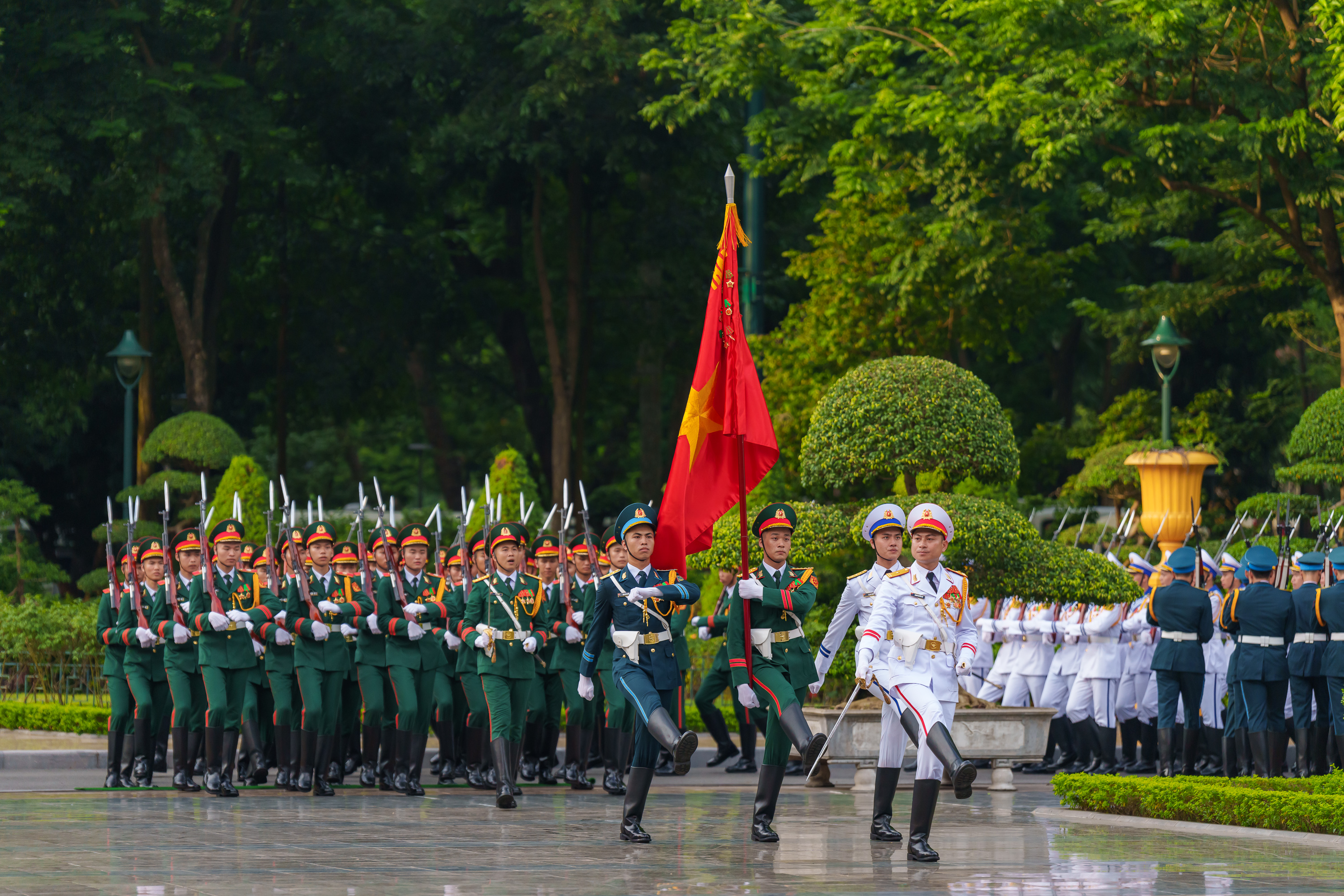
The tri-service Military Honour Guard Battalion of the Vietnam People's Army.

=== Command structure ===
According to the 1992 Constitution of the Socialist Republic of Vietnam, the Ministry of National Defence holds the supreme command of the Vietnam People's Army (VPA) and other paramilitary units. The command organisation of the ministry is composed of the central office, the General Staff (Bộ Tổng tham mưu), the General Political Department of the People's Army (Tổng cục chính trị) and other general departments.

The General Staff is the commanding and co-ordinating institution of the Vietnam People's Army and other paramilitary units, it is currently directed by the Chief of the General Staff and Deputy Minister of Defence who would be also acting minister during the absence of the minister in office. The General Political Department takes charge of political, moral and other activities in the military forces related to the Communist Party of Vietnam, the Department of Politics also operates the system of military court and procuracy.

The General Political Department is under the leadership activities of the Secretariat and often operations under the directly authority of the Central Military Commission. Other general departments (Tổng cục) of the ministry are General Department of Logistics and Engineering (Tổng cục Hậu cần - Kỹ thuật), General Department of Military Industries and Manufacture (Tổng cục Công nghiệp quốc phòng) and General Department of Military Intelligence (Tổng cục Tình báo quốc phòng or Tổng cục 2). Directly under the ministry are also the Search and Rescue Operations Department (Cục Cứu hộ, cứu nạn) and Department of Foreign Relations (Cục Đối ngoại).

The command structure of the ministry is coordinated by the Central Office (Văn phòng Bộ) which acts at the same time as office of the Central Party Committee of the military forces (Quân ủy Trung ương).

The following is the structure of the central organisation of the Ministry of National Defence:

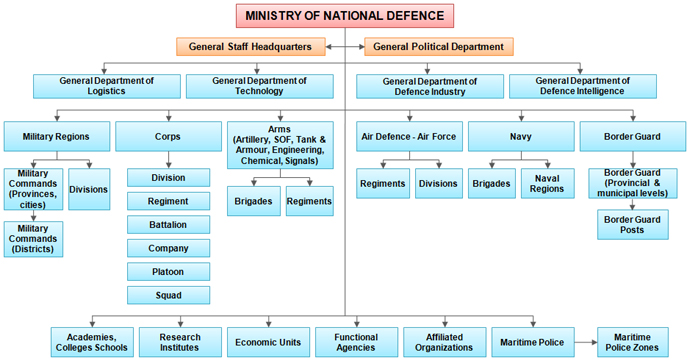
VPA's structure

=== Components ===
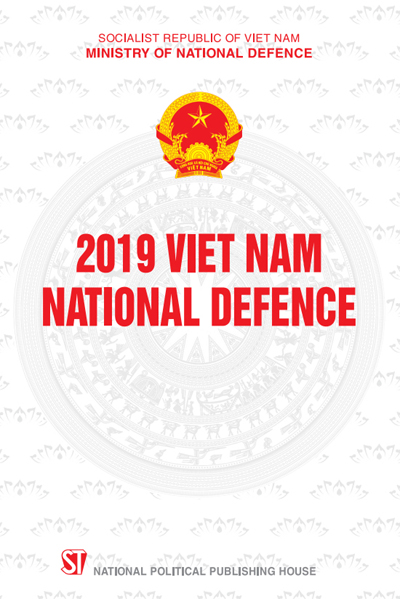
Book cover of 2019 Vietnam National Defence Policy

The Ministry of National Defence is the supreme command of the Vietnam People's Army - VPA which contains several arms and army corps, the Vietnam People's Ground Forces, the Vietnamese People's Navy – VPN, the Vietnamese People's Air Force – Air Defence – VPAF-AD, the Vietnam Border Guard – VBG and the Vietnam Coast Guard – VCG. To organise the military activities and units, the territory of Vietnam is divided into 7 military regions and the Capital High Command which contains the region of Hanoi.

The principal and core military force of Vietnam is the Vietnam People's Army - VPA with a regular force of 450,000 soldiers and officers and the reserve force of about 5 million. The land-based units of the VPA consists of two army corps (quân đoàn): 12th and 34th; six arms (binh chủng): Artillery, Tank and Armor Warfare, Sappers, Signals, Engineers and Chemical; seven military regions (quân khu) and one command (bộ tư lệnh): 1st, 2nd, 3rd, 4th, 5th, 7th, 9th military regions and the High Command of the Capital City of Hanoi. The border guard, coast guard, air force-air defence and the navy are organised as arms of the VPA, the navy in particular is divided in five naval regions (vùng hải quân) (from 1st to 5th).

Besides, the Ministry of National Defence also manages a system of academies, universities and research institutes with a total number of 43 schools include: 12 academies (học viện), 12 universities (trường đại học), 11 colleges and officer candidate schools (trường cao đẳng) and 08 NCO schools (trường trung cấp). The principal academy of the ministry if the National Defence Academy (Học viện Quốc phòng), it is the only institution for training strategical officers. The Ministry of National Defence has its own branch of economic organisations which contains the Viettel Mobile, one of the leading mobile network operator in Vietnam.

== Budget ==
The annual budget of the Ministry of National Defence occupies approximately 2% of the GDP of Vietnam. The major portion of the budget is used for maintenance of officers, NCOs, soldiers and their readiness for action. Following are the ministry's budgets of recent years:

Year	2005	2006	2007	2008	2023 projection	
GDP of Vietnam	839,211	973,791	1,143,442	1,490,000	11,150,705	470
Ministry's budget	16,278	20,577	28,922	27,024	185,235	7.807
% per GDP	1.872%	2.194%	2.529%	1.813%	1.661%	
Unit	billion VND					billion USD

== Public service units ==
- Academies (12):
1. Army Academy
2. National Defence Academy
3. Vietnam Military Political Academy
4. Military Technical Academy – Lê Quý Đôn Technical Academy
5. Air Force – Air Defence Academy
6. Border Guard Academy
7. Military Logistics Academy
8. Military Science Academy
9. Military Medical Academy – Lê Hữu Trác Medicine and Pharmacy Academy
10. Naval Academy
11. Military Cryptography Technical Academy
12. Viettel Academy
- Universities schools (12):
1. First Army Officer University school – Trần Quốc Tuấn University
2. Second Army Officer University school – Nguyễn Huệ University
3. Political Officer University school
4. Artillery Officer University school
5. Chemical Defence Officer University school
6. Special Agent Force Officer University school
7. Communications Officer University school
8. Engineer Officer University school – Ngô Quyền University
9. Tank – Armor Officer University school
10. Air Force Officer University school
11. Vinhempich Military Technical Officer University school – Trần Đại Nghĩa University
12. Military Culture – Arts University school
- Colleges schools (11):
1. First Military Technical College school
2. Second Military Technical College school
3. National Defence Industrial College school
4. Cryptographic Engineer College school
5. First Logistics College school
6. Second Logistics College school
7. Reconnaissance College school
8. Naval Technical College school
9. Air Force - Air Defence Technical College school
10. Information Technology College school
11. Technology and Vehicle Technical College school
- Intermediates levels schools (08):
1. Engineer Technical Intermediate school
2. Middle Vietnam Technical Intermediate school
3. Tank - Armour Technical Intermediate school
4. Cryptography Technical Intermediate school
5. Ordinance Technical Intermediate school
6. First Border Guard Intermediate school
7. Second Border Guard Intermediate school
8. Border Guard 24 Intermediate school

== See also ==
- Vietnam National Defense Television
