= Vietnam National Defense Television =

QPVN
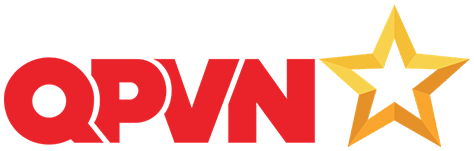
- Country: Vietnam
- Broadcast area: Vietnam

Programming
- Picture format: 1080p HDTV

Ownership
- Owner: Ministry of Defence

History
- Launched: 19 May 2013

Links
- Webcast: http://qpvn.vn/tv.html
- Website: qpvn.vn

Vietnam National Defense Television Channel (Vietnamese: Kênh Truyền hình Quốc Phòng Việt Nam - QPVN) or QPVN channel is a television channel that provides news and information about the Vietnam People's Army and other military and defence news globally. Being a component of the Military Broadcasting Center (Trung tâm Phát thanh - Truyền hình Quân đội), the channel was launched on the 123rd anniversary of the birth of President Ho Chi Minh under the observation of the Central Military Commission and the Ministry of Defence.

== Content ==
Vietnam National Defense Television Channel is the mouthpiece of the Central Military Commission, the Ministry of Defense and the voice of the armed forces. Vietnam National Defense Television Channel is ready to take on the task of Vietnam Television in special emergency situations.
