= 34th Corps (Vietnam) =

Army Corps 34
- Quân đoàn 34
- Logo
- Active: 10 December 2024– present
- Country: Vietnam
- Branch: Active duty
- Type: Army Corps
- Role: Regular force
- Size: Corps
- Part of: People's Army of Vietnam
- Garrison/HQ: Pleiku, Gia Lai
- Mottos: TRUNG THÀNH - ĐOÀN KẾT - TỰ LỰC - SÁNG TẠO - TINH NHUỆ - QUYẾT THẮNG lit. 'Loyal - Solidary - Self-reliant - Creative - Elite - Determined to win'
- Military flag of the Vietnam People's Army

Commanders
- Current commander: Lieutenant general Đào Tuấn Anh
- Deputy Commander and Chief of Staff Commander: Major general Trần Công Đức
- First party committee secretary: Major general Trần Minh Trọng

34th Corps or officially the Army Corps 34 (Vietnamese: Quân đoàn 34) is one of the two regular army corps of the People's Army of Vietnam (PAVN). It was formed in December 2024 as a merger of the 3rd and 4th Corps. The corps is stationed in Pleiku, Gia Lai.

== History ==
On 13 September 2024, the plan to merge the 3rd and 4th Corps to form the 34th Corps was announced in the 3rd Corps Emulation Congress. 3rd and 4th Corps was disbanded on 7 December 2024 to form the 34th Corps.

== Organisation ==
Units of the 3rd Corps and the 4th Corps was merged to form the 34th Corps:

=== Headquarters ===
- Department of Staff
  - 27th Guard Battalion
  - 28th Reconnaissance Battalion
  - 36th Electronic Warfare Battalion
- Department of Politics
  - 34th Corps Military Procuracy
  - 34th Corps Regional Military Procuracy
- Department of Logistics - Technical
  - 827th Transportation Regiment
  - 30th Repair Battalion
  - 789th Logistics - Technical Warehouse
  - 4th Military Hospital
  - 211th Military Hospital

=== Combat forces ===
- 9th Division
  - 1st Infantry Regiment
  - 2nd Infantry Regiment
  - 3rd Infantry Regiment
  - 14th Artillery Battalion
  - 15th Anti-tank Battalion (SPG-9)
  - 20th Reconnaissance Company
  - 16th Air Defense Battalion
  - 17th Engineer Battalion
  - 18th Signals Battalion
  - 24th Medical Battalion
  - 25th Transportation Battalion (KAMAZ truck)
- 10th Division
  - 24th Infantry Regiment
  - 28th Infantry Regiment
  - 66th Infantry Regiment "Plei Me Unit"
  - 4th Artillery Regiment (2S1 SPHs, BM-14MM MLRS)
  - 38th Tank Battalion (T-54/T-55)
  - 16th Air Defense Battalion
  - 17th Engineer Battalion
  - 18th Signals Battalion
- 31st Division
  - 866th Infantry Regiment
  - 922nd Infantry Regiment
  - 977th Infantry Regiment
- 320th Division
  - 48th Mechanized Infantry Regiment (T-54/T-55, BMP-1)
  - 52nd Infantry Regiment
  - 64th Mechanized Infantry Regiment
  - 54th Artillery Regiment (D-20 howitzer, ZiS-3)
  - 15th Anti-tank Battalion (SPG-9)
  - 20th Reconnaissance Company
  - 24th Medical Battalion
- 71st Air Defense Brigade
  - 12th Air Defense Battalion (AZP S-60)
  - 16th Air Defense Battalion (Type 65)
- 234th Air Defense Brigade
  - 1st Air Defense Battalion (Type 65)
  - 3rd Air Defense Battalion (Type 65)
  - 19D32 Observation Post
- 273rd Tank Brigade (T-54/T-55 tanks)
- 40th Artillery Brigade
  - 1st Artillery Battalion (D-20 howitzer, M-46 field gun)
  - 2nd Artillery Battalion (M101 howitzer)
  - 3rd Artillery Battalion (BM-21 MLRS)
- 434th Artillery Brigade
  - 1st Artillery Battalion (M-46 field gun, BM-21 MLRS)
  - 2nd Artillery Battalion (M101 howitzer)
  - 3rd Artillery Battalion
  - Command Company
- 29th Signals Regiment
- 7th Engineer Brigade
  - 1st Engineer Battalion
  - 2nd Engineer Battalion
  - 3rd River Crossing Battalion (PMP floating bridge)

== Commanders ==
Time	Commander	Notes
5/2025– present	Lieutenant General Đào Tuấn Anh	
12/2024–5/2025	Major General Nguyễn Bá Lực	
