= General Department of Defence Intelligence =

Vietnamese military intelligence agency

General Department of Defence Intelligence General Department II
- Tổng cục Tình báo quốc phòng Tổng cục II
- Seal of GDDI

- Flag of General Department II as a unit under the Vietnam People's Army

General Department overview
- Formed: 25 October 1945; 80 years ago
- Preceding agencies: Military Intelligence Division (1946–1947; 1957–1995); Intelligence Agency (1947–1950); Communication Department (1951–1957)
- Type: Strategic intelligence Military intelligence Special operations
- Jurisdiction: Vietnam People's Army
- Headquarters: Bắc Từ Liêm District, Hanoi
- Employees: ~25.000
- Annual budget: Classified
- General Department executives: Phạm Ngọc Hùng, director general; Lê Quang Minh, Commissar; Đặng Vũ Chính, 1st Deputy Director
- Parent department: CPV CMC
- Parent ministry: (Vietnam) SRV MoD

The General Department of Defence Intelligence (GDDI; Vietnamese: Tổng cục Tình báo quốc phòng – TBQP, lit. 'General Department of Intelligence for national defence', sometimes Tổng cục Tình báo, lit. 'General Department of Intelligence'), also recognized by its internal designation General Department II (Tổng cục II or less formally Tổng cục 2 – TC2), is a general department (tổng cục)-level agency under the Vietnam Ministry of National Defence and the strategic and military intelligence service of Vietnam as a component of the Vietnam People’s Army. Being the biggest existing intelligence body in the country, GDDI is currently Vietnam's de facto national intelligence agency, advising and serving the Communist Party as well as its Government.

GDDI is intended to directly carry out intelligence activities at the strategic level, meanwhile serving as the advisory organ for the Minister of National Defence and the General Chief of Staff to consult on the force organization and intelligence operations. It is the lead department directly responsible for instructing and guiding the army’s military intelligence and reconnaissance network in terms of professional intelligence in Vietnam.

== History ==
The Defense Intelligence Force originated from the Military Commission’s Intelligence Office, headed by Hoàng Minh Đạo (real name Đào Phúc Lộc), established on October 25, 1945 (this date is regarded as the traditional founding day of Vietnam’s Defense Intelligence). Hoàng Minh Đạo is considered the first head of the military intelligence sector.

According to Decree No. 34 issued on April 25, 1946 by the President of the Government of the Democratic Republic of Vietnam, Article 10 stated that the Intelligence Bureau was tasked with reconnoitering enemy military situations, monitoring the condition of its own forces, and gathering information beneficial to military operations.

In September 1946, the Military Commission’s Intelligence Office opened a professional training course in Sơn Tây, taught by Colonel Lâm Sơn (a Japanese national), who served as an instructor in intelligence operations.

The Intelligence Bureau was established on March 20, 1947, under the Ministry of National Defence – General Command of the Vietnam National Army. In April 1950, the General Command directed that a portion of the Intelligence Bureau be assigned to reinforce the Military Intelligence Office to form the Military Intelligence Bureau of the General Staff (July 1950). Another part of the Intelligence Bureau merged with the Public Security Department to establish the Intelligence Division under the Public Security Department.

On July 15, 1951, the organization was restructured into the Strategic Intelligence Agency of the Government of the Democratic Republic of Vietnam, named the Liaison Department under the Prime Minister’s Office.

In September 1954, taking advantage of the period implementing the Geneva Accords, Prime Minister Phạm Văn Đồng (on behalf of the Party Central Committee in charge of intelligence), following advice from the Liaison Department, proposed a plan to build enemy-monitoring organizations under local Party committees.

On October 18, 1954, the Enemy Intelligence Committee under the Regional Party Committee was established to unify intelligence forces in the South. Văn Viên served as head; Mai Chí Thọ, Mười Hương, Cao Đăng Chiếm, and Hoàng Minh Đạo were deputy heads.

From 1955 to 1958, due to the effective counterintelligence operations of the Republic of Vietnam, many key networks of the Enemy Intelligence Committee were uncovered and monitored, and several leaders were arrested. This was one of the most difficult periods for the Southern Revolution in general and for the intelligence forces in particular.

On June 10, 1957, the Liaison Department merged with the Military Intelligence Bureau – General Staff (Research Bureau, or Bureau II). From then on, intelligence activities in the South were transferred to the Army.

In 1968, at the request of the General Staff and bureau leadership, the Foreign Intelligence Office (now Bureau 25), in coordination with intelligence teams in Thailand, carried out attacks that damaged numerous aircraft at Utapao and Udon airbases.

In July 1969, Group A22—an intelligence network considered to have penetrated deepest into the government of the Republic of Vietnam—was uncovered. During this period, at least two intelligence networks, A22 and A26, were broken, and several others became ineffective or were placed under surveillance.

In 1971, at least three intelligence sources detected the Republic of Vietnam military’s troop deployment plan to Lower Laos, contributing to the failure of Operation Lam Son 719.

In 1972, Military Intelligence forces, especially Technical Reconnaissance and Strategic Intelligence, detected enemy developments early and contributed to the defeat of the U.S. 12-day-and-night strategic air campaign in December 1972, known as Operation Linebacker II, leading to the “Dien Bien Phu in the Air” victory.

During the Ho Chi Minh Campaign, officers of the Military Intelligence Office supported the preparation of the battlefield and coordinated with uprising forces in Saigon, contributing to the Spring 1975 victory and national reunification.

In 1977, the Military Intelligence Bureau obtained documents indicating that the Khmer Rouge considered Vietnam a perennial adversary. Events along the southwestern border later escalated into the Cambodian–Vietnamese War.

In February 1979, the Sino-Vietnamese War broke out. The Bureau did not anticipate the scale of the conflict with the People's Republic of China.

In May 1983, the Siem Reap incident occurred, affecting relations between Cambodia and Vietnam.

At the end of the Cold War, the Bureau contributed to breaking strategic isolation, helping normalize relations with China and the United States, supporting Vietnam’s later economic and social development.

On September 18, 1992, the Chairman of the Council of Ministers (now the Prime Minister) issued Decree No. 335/HĐBT establishing the General Department of Defence Intelligence under the Ministry of National Defense.

On October 23, 1992, the Ministry of National Defense issued Decision No. 393/QĐ-QP regarding the organization of the General Department of Intelligence.

In 1995, the Intelligence Bureau under the General Staff was upgraded to the General Department of Intelligence (General Department II) under the Ministry of National Defense.

In 1996, the Intelligence Ordinance was passed, stipulating that General Department II is the strategic intelligence agency of the State of Vietnam.

In 2016, General Department II established Center T1, specializing in new forms of intelligence.

In 2019, the Politburo issued Resolution No. 48 on strengthening Party leadership over intelligence work in the new situation.

Entering a new phase, the General Department identified the United States and China as primary intelligence focuses, along with countries in the region, emphasizing new domains such as cyberwarfare and cyber intelligence.

== Combat formations ==
GDDI commissions at least three formal combatant brigades, being field reconnaissance formations. Designated as the special reconnaissance forces (trinh sát đặc nhiệm), they are capable of conducting dedicated frontline military offensive operations as well as infiltration campaigns serving the Vietnamese interests. A majority of GDDI's characteristics and organization is not formally publicized.

- Brigade K3 (Lữ đoàn K3): Northern Vietnam region.
- Brigade 74 (or 74th Brigade; Lữ đoàn 74): Central Vietnam and Central Highlands.
- Brigade 94 (or 94th Brigade; Lữ đoàn 94): Southern Vietnam region.
