= Hoàng Thùy Linh =

Vietnamese actress and V-pop singer (born 1988)

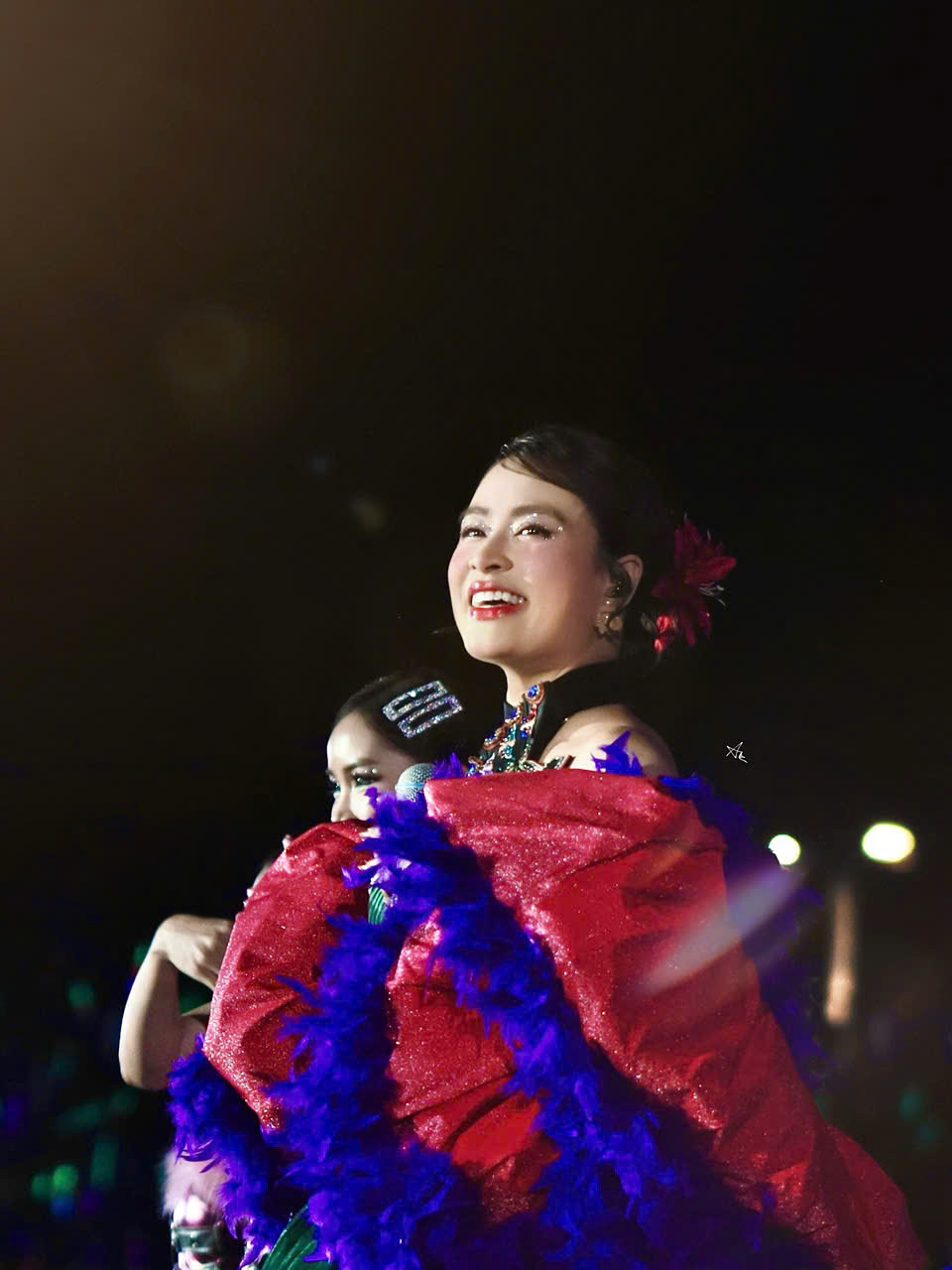
- Linh in 2025
- Born: 11 August 1988 (age 38); Hanoi, Vietnam
- Occupations: Singer, actress, TV personality
- Years active: 2004–
- Musical career
- Genres: Pop; V-pop; teen pop
- Instrument: Vocals
- Label: The Leader Entertainment • Sony Music Vietnam

Hoàng Thùy Linh (Vietnamese pronunciation: [hwaːŋ˨˩ tʰwi˨˩ lïŋ˧˧]; born August 11, 1988) is a Vietnamese singer and actress. She gained recognition for her song "See Tình," with a remixed version that gained popularity on TikTok.

== Early years ==
Her acting career began with the role of Thùy in the drama series Đường đời (Path of Life) in 2004, consisting of 25 episodes and earning her the Golden Award at the Vietnam Drama Festival in 2005.

In 2006, Linh pursued studies at the Department of TV Director at the Vietnam Acting and Film College, completing her degree in 2009.

In 2007, she took on a leading role in the second season of the interactive television programme "Vàng Anh's Diary," originally titled Nhật ký Vàng Anh. The show, a sitcom adapted from Portugal's "Sofia's Diary," received acclaim for its educational content aimed at Vietnamese youth.

== Controversy ==
In September 2007, a private video featuring Thùy Linh engaging in sexual activities with her boyfriend, known as Viet "dart," was leaked online. Initially posted on YouTube, the video was taken down and later circulated on Vietnamese forums, leading to dissemination throughout the nation. The video's impact reached domestic and international audiences, drawing attention from media outlets in the UK and the US.

== Filmography ==
=== Film ===
Year	Title	English title	Role	Notes
2013	Thần Tượng	The Talent	Thùy Linh	Lead role
2020	Trái Tim Quái Vật	The Instrument of Murder	Khánh	Lead role

=== Television ===
Year	Title	English title	Role	Notes
2004	Đường Đời		Thùy	
2005	Trò Đùa Của Số Phận		Hằng	
2006	Đi Về Phía Mặt Trời		Lan	
2007	Nhật Ký Vàng Anh		Vàng Anh	Main role (Season 2)
2018	Ngày Ấy Mình Đã Yêu			Cameo
2019	Mê Cung	Maze	Lam Anh	

== Discography ==
=== Albums ===
==== Studio albums ====
Title	Details
Hoàng Thùy Linh (Reissue: Nhịp Đập Giấc Mơ)	Released: 14 April 2010; Label: Dihavina, Viết Tân; Formats: CD, digital download
Đừng Vội Vàng	Released: 12 January 2011; Label: Dihavina, Viết Tân; Formats: CD, digital download
Hoàng	Released: 21 October 2019; Label: The Leader, Sony Music, Times; Formats: CD, LP, digital download, cassette
Link	Released: 11 August 2022; Label: The Leader, Sony Music, Times; Formats: CD, digital download

==== Compilations ====
Title	Details
The Ballad Hits	Released: 21 March 2017; Label: The Leader Entertainment; Formats: Streaming, digital download

=== Extended plays ===
Title	Details
Hoàng Thùy Linh Mini Album 2012	Released: 11 July 2012; Label: The Leader Entertainment, Sony Music Entertainment; Formats: Streaming, digital download
Hoàng Thùy Linh 2013	Released: 15 May 2013; Label: The Leader Entertainment; Formats: Streaming, digital download
S.I.X (with TripleD)	Released: 15 June 2016; Label: The Leader Entertainment; Formats: Streaming, digital download

=== Singles ===
==== As lead artist ====
Title	Year	Peak chart positions		Album	Ref
Title	Year	VIE Hot	VIE Top	Album	Ref
"Nhịp Đập Giấc Mơ (Beat of Dreams)"	2010	(Note: Billboard Vietnam was launched on January 14, 2022.)		Hoàng Thùy Linh	
"Đừng Vội Vàng (Don't Rush)"	2011	(Note: Billboard Vietnam was launched on January 14, 2022.)		Đừng Vội Vàng (Don't Rush)	
"Ngày Không Anh (A Day Without You)"	2011	(Note: Billboard Vietnam was launched on January 14, 2022.)		Đừng Vội Vàng (Don't Rush)	
"Lại Lần Nữa (Yet Again)"	2011	(Note: Billboard Vietnam was launched on January 14, 2022.)		Đừng Vội Vàng (Don't Rush)	
"Rơi (Fallin')"	2012	(Note: Billboard Vietnam was launched on January 14, 2022.)		Mini Album 2012	
"Chạy Trốn (I Wanna Run)"	2013	(Note: Billboard Vietnam was launched on January 14, 2022.)		Đừng Vội Vàng (Don't Rush)	
"Last Time"	2013	(Note: Billboard Vietnam was launched on January 14, 2022.)		Hoàng Thùy Linh (2013)	
"Crazy"	2013	(Note: Billboard Vietnam was launched on January 14, 2022.)		Hoàng Thùy Linh (2013)	
"High"	2013	(Note: Billboard Vietnam was launched on January 14, 2022.)		Hoàng Thùy Linh (2013)	
"Just You" (featuring Wowy and I.A.MY)	2015	(Note: Billboard Vietnam was launched on January 14, 2022.)		Non-album single	
"I'm Gonna Break"	2016	(Note: Billboard Vietnam was launched on January 14, 2022.)		S.I.X	
"Bánh Trôi Nước (Woman)"	2016	(Note: Billboard Vietnam was launched on January 14, 2022.)		S.I.X	
"Fall in Love" (featuring Kimmese)	2018	(Note: Billboard Vietnam was launched on January 14, 2022.)		Non-album single	
"Để Mị Nói Cho Mà Nghe (Let Mi Tell)"	2019	96	63	Hoàng	
"Tứ Phủ (Four Palaces)" (featuring Hồ Hoài Anh and TripleD)	2019			Hoàng	
"Duyên Âm (Love of Ghost)"	2019			Hoàng	
"Kẻ Cắp Gặp Bà Già (Diamond Cut Diamond)" (featuring Binz)	2020		79	Hoàng	
"Gieo Quẻ (Casting Coins)" (featuring Đen)	2022	2	2	Link	
"See Tình"	2022	2	1	Link	
"Đánh Đố (The Mind Game)" (featuring Thanh Lam and Tùng Dương)	2022	44	35	Link	
"Bo Xì Bo (Pause Pause)"	2022	1	1	Link	
"Hạ Phỏm (All Cards on Desk)"	2023	18	13	Link	
"Miền Đất Hứa" (with Đen)	2023	75	51	Non-album single	

==== Promotional singles ====
Title	Year	Peak chart positions		Album	Ref
Title	Year	VIE Hot	VIE Top	Album	Ref
"Hờn Dỗi (Sulk)" (Dance Version)	2013	—N/a	—N/a	Non-album promotional single	
"Đi Rồi Sẽ Đến"	2013	—N/a	—N/a	Thần Tượng OST	
"Rơi (Fallin')" (2014 Dance Version)	2014	—N/a	—N/a	Non-album promotional singles	
"Crazy (TLVR RMX)"	2015	—N/a	—N/a	Non-album promotional singles	
"Thì Thầm Mùa Xuân (Whispering Spring)"	2016	—N/a	—N/a	Non-album promotional singles	
"London Bridge"	2016	—N/a	—N/a	S.I.X	
"Break the Rules"	2016	—N/a	—N/a	Non-album promotional singles	
"Đón Xuân Tuyệt Vời (Gorgeous New Year)" (with Chi Pu)	2017	—N/a	—N/a	Non-album promotional singles	
"Material Girl"	2017	—N/a	—N/a	Non-album promotional singles	
"Chuyện Tình Lá Gió (Love Story of Wind and Leaf)"	2017	—N/a	—N/a	The Ballad Hits	
"Đôi Khi Em Muốn Khóc (Sometimes, I Wanna Cry)"	2017	—N/a	—N/a	The Ballad Hits	
"Mê Cung (The Maze)"	2019	—N/a	—N/a	Mê Cung OST	
"Làm Gì Phải Hốt" (with JustaTee & Đen)	2020	12	11	Non-album promotional singles	
"Việt Nam Tử Tế" (with Lam Trường, Tóc Tiên, Erik & Karik)	2020	—N/a	—N/a	Non-album promotional singles	
"Khi Tình Yêu Đủ Lớn (Once Love Fulfill)" (featuring Rtee)	2020	—N/a	—N/a	Non-album promotional singles	
"Cánh Cửa Diệu Kỳ" (with Dế Choắt, Hoàng Rob & Khắc Hưng)	2021	—N/a	—N/a	Diệu Kỳ Việt Nam	
"Em Đây Chẳng Phải Thúy Kiều (I Am Not Thuy Kieu)"	2021	57	36	Hoàng	
"Lắm Mối Tối Ngồi Không (Run After Two Hares, Catch Nones)"	2021	—N/a	—N/a	Hoàng	
"Kẽo Cà Kẽo Kẹt (The Creeking)"	2021	—N/a	—N/a	Hoàng	
"Việt Nam Hết Mình" (with Karik & Only C)	2022	—	—	Non-album promotional singles	
"Kiềng Ba Chân" (with Karik)	2022	—	—	Non-album promotional singles	
"Đợi Chờ Đừng Cáu" (with Phan Mạnh Quỳnh)	2023	—	—	Non-album promotional singles	
"Chất Êm. My Game" (with 16 Typh & Touliver)	2023	—	—	Non-album promotional singles	

==== Other charted songs ====
Title	Year	Peak chart positions		Album	Ref
Title	Year	VIE Hot	VIE Top	Album	Ref
"không một bài hát nào có thể diễn tả cảm xúc của em lúc này. (Inexplicable)" (featuring Thanh Bui)	2022	5	4	Link	
"Lúc Thấy Lúc Không (See Saw Seen)"	2022	9	8	Link	
"Bắt Vía (Manipulate)" (featuring Wren Evans and Mew Amazing)	2022	15	13	Link	
"Trưởng Nữ Chạy Trốn (The Runaway Eldest)"	2022	17	15	Link	

== Awards and nominations ==
=== Music ===
Devotion Music Awards

The Devotion Music Awards is an annual music accolade bestowed by Sports and Culture, a renowned entertainment newspaper in Vietnam. This award aims to acknowledge outstanding contributions to the richness and development of Vietnamese pop music. Regarded as the Vietnamese equivalent of the Grammy Awards, the Devotion Music Awards cover various categories within the music industry.

An achievement in the history of these awards is credited to Linh, who became the first Vietnamese artist to clinch victories in all four major categories in a single year.

Year	Category	Nominated work/Recipient	Result	Note
2017	Best Music Video of the Year	"Bánh Trôi Nước (Woman)"	Nominated	
2020	Best Album of the Year	Hoàng	Won	
2020	Best Song of the Year	"Để Mị Nói Cho Mà Nghe"	Won	
2020	Best Music Video of the Year	"Để Mị Nói Cho Mà Nghe"	Won	
2020	Best Singer of the Year	Herself	Won	
2021	Best Music Video of the Year	"Kẻ Cắp Gặp Bà Già"	Nominated	
2023	Best Album of the Year	LINK	Won	
2023	Best Song of the Year	"Gieo Quẻ"	Nominated	
2023	Best Music Video of the Year	"Gieo Quẻ"	Won	
2023	Best Female Artist of the Year	Herself	Won	

Harper's Bazaar Star Awards

Year	Category	Nominated work/Recipient	Result	Note
2019	Female Artist of the Year	Herself	Won	

Golden Apricot Blossom Awards

Year	Category	Nominated work/Recipient	Result	Note
2019	Artist of the Year	Herself	Won	
2019	Song of the Year	"Để Mị Nói Cho Mà Nghe"	Won	
2019	Favorite Female Pop Singer	"Để Mị Nói Cho Mà Nghe"	Won	
2020	Favorite Female Pop Singer	"Kẻ Cắp Gặp Bà Già"	Nominated	

Green Wave Music Awards

The inception of the Green Wave Music Awards dates back to 1997, and it is organized by the 99.9 MHz FM radio station of the Voice of the People of Ho Chi Minh City.

Linh became the first artist ever to secure victories in all eight nominated categories in a single year at the Green Wave Music Awards.

Year	Category	Nominated work/Recipient	Result	Note
2019	Song of the Year	"Để Mị Nói Cho Mà Nghe"	Won	
2019	Influence Award	"Để Mị Nói Cho Mà Nghe"	Won	
2019	Music Video of the Year	"Để Mị Nói Cho Mà Nghe"	Won	
2019	Top 10 Songs of the Year	"Để Mị Nói Cho Mà Nghe"	Recipient	
2019	Best Collaboration	"Để Mị Nói Cho Mà Nghe" (shared with producers DTAP)	Won	
2019	Best Sound Mixing	"Để Mị Nói Cho Mà Nghe" (shared with producers DTAP)	Won	
2019	Breakthrough Artist of the Year	Herself	Won	
2019	Female Artist of the Year	Herself	Won	
2020	Female Artist of the Year	Herself	Nominated	
2021	Female Artist of the Year	Herself	Nominated	
2022	Female Artist of the Year	Herself	Won	
2022	Album of the Year	LINK	Won	
2022	Music Video of the Year	"Gieo Quẻ"	Nominated	
2022	Best Collaboration	"Gieo Quẻ"	Nominated	
2022	Song of the Year	"See Tình"	Won	
2022	Viral Song of the Year	"See Tình"	Nominated	
2022	Top 10 Songs of the Year	"See Tình"	Recipient	
2022	Best Sound Mixing	"See Tình" (shared with producers DTAP)	Won	
2023	Female Artist of the Year	Herself	Nominated	
2023	Music Video of the Year	"Bo Xì Bo"	Won	

Men&Life Awards

Year	Category	Nominated work/Recipient	Result	Note
2020	Singer of the Year	Herself	Won	

METUB WebTVAsia Awards

Year	Category	Nominated work/Recipient	Result	Note
2019	Viral Music Video of the Year	"Để Mị Nói Cho Mà Nghe"	Won	

Mnet Asian Music Awards

Year	Category	Nominated work/Recipient	Result	Note
2019	Best Asian Artist - Vietnam	Herself	Won	

POP Music Awards

Year	Category	Nominated work/Recipient	Result	Note
2016	Video of the Year	"Bánh Trôi Nước (Woman)"	Nominated	

YanVpop20 Awards

Year	Category	Nominated work/Recipient	Result	Note
2016	Music Video of the Year	"Bánh Trôi Nước (Woman)"	Won	
2016	Top 20 Songs of the Year	"Bánh Trôi Nước (Woman)"	Recipient	

Zing Music Awards

Year	Category	Nominated work/Recipient	Result	Note
2014	Female Artist of the Year	Herself	Nominated	
2016	Music Video of the Year	"Bánh Trôi Nước (Woman)"	Nominated	

=== Acting ===
Year	Category	Nominated work/Recipient	Result	Note
2013	Best Leading Actress	Thần Tượng	Nominated	

VTV Festival

Year	Category	Nominated work/Recipient	Result	Note
2004	Breakthrough Actress	Đường đời	Won	

=== Other accolades ===
ELLE Style Awards

Year	Category	Nominated work/Recipient	Result	Note
2019	Most Stylist Female Singer of the Year	Herself	Won	

WeChoice Awards

Year	Category	Nominated work/Recipient	Result	Note
2017	Top 10 Inspirational Public Figures	Herself	Nominated	
2019	Top 10 Inspirational Public Figures	Herself	Won	
2019	Breakthrough Artist of the Year	Herself	Nominated	
2019	Music Video of the Year	Để Mị Nói Cho Mà Nghe	Nominated	
