= Để Mị nói cho mà nghe =

Single by Hoàng Thùy Linh

from the album Hoàng
- Released: 19 June 2019
- Recorded: 2019
- Studio: Studio 13 (Ho Chi Minh City)
- Genre: Future bass; Folktronica; World music
- Length: 3:13
- Label: The Leader Entertainment; Sony Music Vietnam
- Songwriters: Thịnh Kainz; Kata Trần; T-Bass
- Producer: Thịnh Kainz

Hoàng Thùy Linh singles chronology
"Fall in Love" (2018)	"Để Mị nói cho mà nghe" (2019)	"Tứ phủ" (2019)

Music video
- "Để Mị Nói Cho Mà Nghe" on YouTube

"Để Mị nói cho mà nghe" (lit. 'Let Mị tell') is a song by Vietnamese singer Hoàng Thùy Linh in her third studio album, Hoàng (2019). It was released by The Leader Entertainment on June 19, 2019 as the lead single from the album. The song was written by Thịnh Kainz, Kata Trần, T-Bass, and is produced by Kainz himself. "Để Mị nói cho mà nghe" has a pop soundtrack, blending world music, folktronica, and future bass. In the lyrics, the main character, Mị, expresses a desire to enjoy her youth by partying, inspired by the short story Vợ chồng A Phủ (1952).

"Để Mị nói cho mà nghe" received praise from both the public and professionals. The song won "Song of the Year" and "Music Video of the Year" from the Dedication Music Award 2020, and won a record six awards from Làn Sóng Xanh, as well as three awards from giải Mai Vàng (Golden Plum Award) and one award from WebTVAsia Awards 2019.

The music video of "Để Mị nói cho mà nghe" was officially released on YouTube on June 19, 2019. The video is directed by Nhu Đặng, who previously directed the winning video of the Dedication Music Award.

== Live performances ==
- ABU TV Song Festival 2019 in Japan
- Lễ Trao Giải Elle Style Award 2019
- V-Heartbeat Live 2019
- Sóng 20 HTV2 2020

== Awards ==
Name	Award	Category	Result	References
2020	Làn Sóng Xanh	Top 10 Favorite Song	Won	
2020	Làn Sóng Xanh	Song of the Year	Won	
2020	Làn Sóng Xanh	Bài hát hiện tượng	Won	
2020	Làn Sóng Xanh	Best Collaboration	Won	
2020	Làn Sóng Xanh	Hòa âm phối khí	Won	
2020	Làn Sóng Xanh	Music Video of the Year	Won	
2020	Dedication Music Awards	Music Video of the Year	Won	
2020	Dedication Music Awards	Song of the Year	Won	

== Charts ==
Chart (2022)	Peak position
Vietnam (Vietnam Hot 100)	96

== Contributors ==
- Hoàng Thùy Linh — lead vocals
- Đoàn Hân — backing vocals
- Thịnh Kainz, Kata Trần — composers
- Thịnh Kainz, Kata Trần and T-Bass — lyricists
- Thịnh Kainz — producer
- Thịnh Kainz, Tùng Cedrus — arrangers
- Minh Maximum — mixing and mastering
- Đinh Nhật Minh — sáo mèo

== Release history ==
Country	Date	Format	Record label
Vietnam	June 24, 2019	Digital download	The Leader Entertainment
