= 7th Military Region (People's Army of Vietnam) =

Military region of the People's Army of Vietnam

Coordinates: 11.5°N 107.5°E

Quân khu 7 (7th Military Region)
- Active: 10 December 1945 – present
- Country: Vietnam
- Allegiance: People's Army of Vietnam
- Branch: Active duty
- Role: Regular force
- Size: Equivalent to Corps
- Part of: People's Army of Vietnam
- Garrison/HQ: Phú Nhuận district, Ho Chi Minh City
- Engagements: First Indochina War; Vietnam War; Cambodian–Vietnamese War
- Decorations: Gold Star Order

Commanders
- Current commander: Lieutenant General Lê Xuân Thế
- Political commissar: Lieutenant General Trần Vinh Ngọc

The 7th Military Region of the People's Army of Vietnam, is directly under the Ministry of Defence of Vietnam, tasked to organise, build, manage and command armed forces defending Southeast Vietnam.

== Agencies ==
- Department of Staff
  - 47th Reconnaissance Battalion
  - 60th Commando Battalion
  - 180th Guard Battalion
  - Unmanned Vehicle Battalion
  - 10th Artillery Command Battalion
  - 97th Electronic Warfare Battalion (V-ELINT 18)
  - 38th Chemical Defense Battalion (Zil-131 ARS-14)
  - Band of 7th Military Region
- Department of Politics
  - Division of Organisation
  - Division of Cadre
  - Division of Policy
  - Division of Propaganda and Training
  - Division of Thoughts and Culture
  - Military Court of Military Region
  - Military Procuratorate of Military Region
  - Military Museum of Ho Chi Minh Campaign of 7th Military Region: No. 2, Lê Duẩn Boulevard, District 1 (Vietnamese: Quận 1), Ho Chi Minh City
  - Newspaper of 7th Military Region
  - Troupe of 7th Military Region
  - K70 Unit (body recovery unit)
- Department of Logistics - Technical
  - 657th Transportation Brigade
  - 4th Military Hospital
  - 7A Military Hospital
  - 7B Military Hospital
  - OX1 Workshop
  - K6 Warehouse
  - K9 Warehouse
- 7th Military Region Military School
- Southern Region Cadet Military School
- National Shooting Range 3rd Region

== Subordinate units ==
- Military Command of Ho Chi Minh City
  - Border Guard Command of Ho Chi Minh City
  - 6th Infantry Regiment
  - 10th Infantry Regiment
  - 38th Infantry Regiment
  - 39th Mixed Regiment (Côn Đảo Island)
    - 2nd Infantry Battalion
    - 8th Artillery Company (D-44 field guns)
    - 9th Artillery Company
    - 10th Artillery Company
    - 7th Air Defense Company (Type 65 anti-aircraft guns)
    - Signals Company
    - 792nd Engineer Battalion
    - K899 Storage Company
  - Gia Định Regiment
  - Minh Đạm Regiment
  - Armored Battalion (PT-76, BTR-60PB)
  - 31st Guard - Military Police Battalion
  - 34th Artillery Company (M101 howitzers)
  - 36th Artillery Company (D-44 field guns)
  - 38th Artillery Company (D-44 field guns)
  - 37th Air Defense Company (Type 65 anti-aircraft guns)
  - Signals Company
  - Engineer Company
  - Electronic Warfare Battalion
  - K694 Storage Company
  - Phú Mỹ Hưng Shooting Range
- Military Command of Lâm Đồng Province
  - Border Guard Command of Lâm Đồng
  - 40th Infantry Regiment
  - 812th Infantry Regiment
  - 994A Infantry Regiment
  - 994B Infantry Regiment
  - Phú Quý Mixed Battalion
  - 3 Mechanized Reconnaissance Companies (BTR-152)
  - Signals Company
  - Engineer Company
  - K75 Unit (body recovery unit)
- Military Command of Đồng Nai City
  - Border Guard Command of Đồng Nai
  - 41st Infantry Regiment
  - Đồng Nai Regiment
  - 736th Infantry Regiment
  - 2 Mechanized Reconnaissance Companies (BTR-152)
  - Guard - Military Police Platoon
  - K72 Unit (body recovery unit)
- Military Command of Tây Ninh Province
  - Border Guard Command of Tây Ninh
  - 42nd Infantry Regiment
  - 174th Infantry Regiment
  - 738th Infantry Regiment
  - 2 Mechanized Reconnaissance Companies (BTR-152)
  - Signals Company
  - Engineer Company
  - Guard - Military Police Platoon
  - K71 Unit (body recovery unit)
  - K73 Unit (body recovery unit)
- 5th Division
  - 4th Infantry Regiment
  - 5th Infantry Regiment
  - 271st Infantry Regiment
  - 14th Artillery Battalion
  - 15th Anti-tank Battalion (SPG-9)
  - 17th Engineer Battalion
    - 1st Engineer Company (Structural)
    - 2nd Engineer Company (Road and Bridge)
    - 3rd Engineer Company (Movement support and obstacles)
  - 18th Signal Battalion
  - 20th Reconnaissance Company
  - 24th Medical Battalion
  - 25th Transportation Battalion
  - 19th Chemical Defense Company
- 7th Division
  - 141st Infantry Regiment
  - 165th Infantry Regiment
  - 209th Infantry Regiment
- 302nd Division
  - 88th Infantry Regiment
  - 201st Infantry Regiment
  - 429th Infantry Regiment
- 309th Division
  - 31st Infantry Regiment
  - 96th Infantry Regiment
  - 250th Infantry Regiment
- 26th Tank Brigade
  - 20th Storage Battalion (T-54/T-55)
  - 21st Tank Battalion (T-54/T-55)
  - 22nd Tank Battalion (T-54/T-55)
  - 12th Reconnaissance Company (BRDM-2)
- 75th Artillery Brigade
  - 1st Artillery Battalion (D-20 howitzer)
  - 2nd Artillery Battalion (M101 howitzer)
  - 3rd Artillery Battalion (BM-14MM MLRS)
- 77th Air Defense Brigade
  - 1st Air Defense Battalion (AZP S-60)
  - 3rd Air Defense Battalion (Type 65 anti-aircraft guns)
  - 4th Air Defense Battalion (Strela-2, Type 65 anti-aircraft guns)
  - Signals Company
- 25th Engineer Brigade
  - 25th Engineer Battalion
  - 98th Engineer Battalion
  - 278th Engineer Battalion
  - 739th Engineer Battalion
  - 741st River Crossing Battalion (PTS, GSP-55)
- 23rd Signals Brigade
  - 40th Signals Battalion
  - 42nd Signals Battalion
  - 44th Signals Battalion (wired communication)
- 778th Economic - Defense Group
- Lâm Đồng Economic - Defense Group

=== Independent units ===
- 22nd Tank Brigade of Tank - Armored Arms (Đồng Nai)
  - 1st Tank Battalion (T-54/T-55)
  - 2nd Tank Battalion (T-54/T-55)
  - 3rd Armored Battalion (M113 ACAV)
  - 12th Reconnaissance Company
  - 13th Signals Company
  - 14th Engineer Company
  - 15th Transportation Company
  - 11th Repair Company
- 94th Special Reconnaissance Brigade of General Department of Defence Intelligence (Ho Chi Minh City)
- 429th Commando Brigade of Special Forces Arms (Ho Chi Minh City)
- 96th Artillery Brigade of Artillery - Missile Command (Đồng Nai)
  - 1st Artillery Battalion (D-20 howitzer)
  - 2nd Artillery Battalion
  - 3rd Artillery Battalion (BM-21 MLRS)
- 596th Signals Brigade of Signals Arms (Ho Chi Minh City)
  - 12th Signals Battalion (wired communication & SATCOM)
  - 36th Signals Battalion (wired communication & SATCOM)
  - 133rd Signals Battalion (radio communication)
- 98th Electronic Warfare Brigade of Electronic Warfare Department (Ho Chi Minh City)
- 87th Chemical Defense Brigade of Chemical Arms (Đồng Nai)
  - 907th Chemical Defense Battalion
  - 908th Chemical Defense Battalion
  - 909th Chemical Defense Battalion
- 16th Army Corps (Economic - Defense corps) (Đồng Nai)
  - 717th Economic - Defense Group
  - 719th Economic - Defense Group
  - 720th Economic - Defense Group (Lâm Đồng Province)
  - 726th Economic - Defense Group (Lâm Đồng Province)
  - 16th Military - Civilian Hospital
- J250 Warehouse of Vehicle - Machinery Department (Đồng Nai)
  - National Reserve Vehicle Depot
  - Defense Reserve Vehicle Depot
  - Materials Storage Depot
  - Maintenance - Repair Station
  - Mechanical - Carpentry Workshop
  - Guard Company

== Successive Commander and Leadership ==
=== Commanders ===
- Colonel General Trần Văn Trà (1976–1978)
- Lieutenant General (1974), Colonel General (1980), General (1984) Lê Đức Anh, (1978–1981)
- Lieutenant General Đồng Văn Cống (1981–1982)
- Lieutenant General, Colonel General (1986) Nguyễn Minh Châu (1982–1987)
- Lieutenant General Nguyễn Thới Bưng (1987–1990)
- Lieutenant General Bùi Thanh Vân (1990–1994)
- Lieutenant General Đỗ Quang Hưng (1994–1995)
- Lieutenant General Lê Văn Dũng (1995–1998): promoted to General, Director of General Department of Politics of Vietnam People's Army
- Lieutenant General Phan Trung Kiên (1998–2003): promoted to Colonel General, member of Central Committee of the Communist Party of Vietnam, Deputy Minister of Ministry of Defence.
- Lieutenant General Nguyễn Văn Chia (2003–2005)
- Lieutenant General Lê Mạnh (2005-2/2009)
- Lieutenant General Triệu Xuân Hòa (2/2009-2011): honoured as Hero of the People's Armed Forces (1983)
- Lieutenant General Trần Đơn (2011–2015)
- Lieutenant General Võ Minh Lương (2015–2020)
- Lieutenant General Nguyễn Trường Thắng (2020–2025)
- Major General Lê Xuân Thế (2025–present)

=== Political Commissioners, Deputy Commanders of Politics ===
- Colonel General Trần Văn Trà (1976–1978)
- Colonel General Lê Đức Anh (1978–1981)
- Colonel General Nguyễn Minh Châu (1982–1987)
- Lieutenant General Lê Thành Tâm (1997–2004): Deputy Commander of politics, now Chairman of Ho Chi Minh City Vietnam Veterans.
- Lieutenant General Nguyễn Thành Cung (2004–2010), Political Commissar. member of Central Committee of the Communist Party of Vietnam
- Lieutenant General Phạm Văn Dỹ (2010–2018)
- Lieutenant General Trần Hoài Trung (2018–2025)
- Major General Trần Vinh Ngọc (2025–present)
