= Sự nghiệp chướng =

2025 single by Pháo

Song by Pháo
- Genre: Hip hop; urban
- Songwriter: Pháo
- Producer: Kerem Kocak

"Sự nghiệp chướng" (lit. 'Karmic career') is a diss track by Vietnamese rapper Pháo, with a remix produced by Kerem Kocak. It was released in 2025. The track incorporates elements of hip hop and contemporary urban music, blending trap, funk, jazz, and dark pop.

The title of the song is a wordplay involving the terms "career" and "karma". Its lyrics centre on a girl criticizing her unfaithful boyfriend, employing common stylistic devices in Vietnamese hip hop such as wordplay, metaphors, and comparisons. The accompanying visualizer music video reached number one on YouTube's trending chart. The single debuted at number two on the Official Vietnam Chart compiled by the International Federation of the Phonographic Industry (IFPI).

== Background ==
YouTube streamer ViruSs and TikToker Ngoc Kem announced their breakup in mid-March 2025. In the days that followed, both made public remarks about the relationship, culminating in a livestream by Ngoc Kem on March 20, 2025, in which she accused her former partner of infidelity. The broadcast drew nearly 200,000 viewers. ViruSs denied the allegation and responded with a livestream report on the morning of March 21.

Later that day, rapper Pháo released "Sự nghiệp chướng" on YouTube. The combination of the song's lyrics and Ngoc Kem's sharing of the track generated significant public attention, with speculation that the diss was directed at ViruSs. Pháo later told producer Only C that "Sự nghiệp chướng" was not her only track addressing an ex-partner, suggesting that additional unreleased material existed.

== Composition ==
Pháo stated that "Sự nghiệp chướng" was developed from a demo she had prepared in 2024. The song features a funk-inspired beat and a harmonically divided structure produced by Turkish music producer Kerem Kocak, reportedly costing 1.3 million VND. Based on the demo, Pháo completed the lyrics and arrangement before officially releasing the track. Hoàng Minh of Đầu Tư Tài Chính magazine described "Sự nghiệp chướng" as an example of a music release that required relatively little financial investment but was still able to achieve commercial success. The rap incorporates tempo changes, shifting from melodic rap passages to the hook.

Lyrically, the track tells the story of a woman who falls in love with a man lacking sincerity, who mistreats and ultimately betrays her. The protagonist responds through wordplay, metaphors, and comparisons, satirizing her partner's negative traits and lifestyle. Throughout the hooks, Pháo references the ex-partner using identifiers connected to his life as a musician, including: "Tears stuck on the music sheet / Thought it was jade and precious stones, he loves silver [...] The person I love is extravagant, flirtatious, and unfaithful." In the opening rap segment, she criticizes him directly with lines such as "calling him an obstacle, an eyesore, an earsore." The track also employs punchlines characteristic of Vietnamese rap battles, including "making diss music like this is too nice" and "this pig denies being evil, they don't know who I am." She also delivers four-bar verses that narrate specific events, for example: "That night, he took her into the small room / Closed, just listening you know the story is unfolding like a movie."

In the second segment, Pháo references Peter Pan syndrome, criticizing her ex-boyfriend's refusal to mature: "I don't believe it but it's true / Peter Pan means never growing up." She continues with satirical comparisons, rapping: "Tomorrow I'll leave, my name is beautiful for life / but your name is harmful to the Fatherland and the whole country" before shifting tone, changing pronouns to the more confrontational you–me, and threatening: "to slap you once and you'll be sent to the maxillofacial hospital, orthopedic trauma department." She later adopts a more subdued stance, saying she would "leave quietly" while warning her ex-lover to "be smart and live a decent life."

At the conclusion of "Sự nghiệp chướng", a male voice recording is heard, widely noted for its resemblance in tone and style to ViruSs: "[...] But I always have feelings for you, always think about you / And if you don't want to talk about it now / Then that's fine / As long as you're happy."

== Reception ==
Pháo did not directly address the lyrics of "Sự nghiệp chướng", instead posting only a cryptic story on social media without naming any individuals. This ambiguity led to widespread speculation about her involvement in the controversy, contributing to the song's rapid rise in popularity. According to Social Trend, as of March 24, 2025, the track had generated approximately 294,000 discussions among Vietnamese social media users. Some speculated about Pháo's past relationships, noting a brief connection with rapper Tez and later rumours involving Hải Đăng Doo, while others argued that she had no links to ViruSs. Another viewpoint held that Pháo was simply portraying a fictional character rather than referencing her personal life. Pháo's management company denied her involvement, stating: "All the information being circulated is just online content, not official. We do not confirm any information."

Other artists responded to the song's popularity, with streamer MisThy reposting its lyrics and singer Emma Nhật Khánh releasing "Fake It Up", which also addressed the theme of so-called "red flag" men. Numerous YouTube and TikTok streamers released reaction videos, capitalising on both ViruSs's controversy and the themes of "Sự nghiệp chướng". On March 23, 2025, ViruSs himself posted a reaction video, saying: "A lot of people sent me and said that this song is for me [...] Maybe people saw the word 'career' and attached me to it." He also remarked: "Now I know Pháo is like that," while otherwise offering praise for the track.

Writer Lê Vy attributed the song's viral spread to FOMO among Vietnamese internet users, alongside algorithmic amplification on social networking platforms. Within a day of its release, the lyric video for "Sự nghiệp chướng" reached number two on YouTube's trending chart. By March 24, 2025, it surpassed Hòa Minzy's "Bắc Bling" to take the top position. On the same day, ViruSs's reaction video also entered YouTube's top two trending, a simultaneous achievement described as unprecedented in Vietnamese music.

Media commentators characterised the track as an example of rap that effectively combines diss traditions with media strategy, avoiding overt personal attacks while still provoking debate. Writing for Tuổi Trẻ, Đậu Dung praised Pháo as a rare female rapper who demonstrated comprehensive diss-rap skills, including linguistic dexterity, flow, storytelling, metaphors, and feminist messaging within a genre often associated with masculine aggressiveness. Lê Vy further compared the success of "Sự nghiệp chướng" to Shakira's Bzrp Music Sessions, Vol. 53 (2023), noting that both became major hits centred on themes of women's emotional responses to unfaithful ex-partners.
