= Quế Võ (disambiguation) =

Quế Võ may refer to the following in Vietnam:

- Quế Võ (town)
- Quế Võ
