= Quế Võ =

- Ward
- Quế Võ Ward
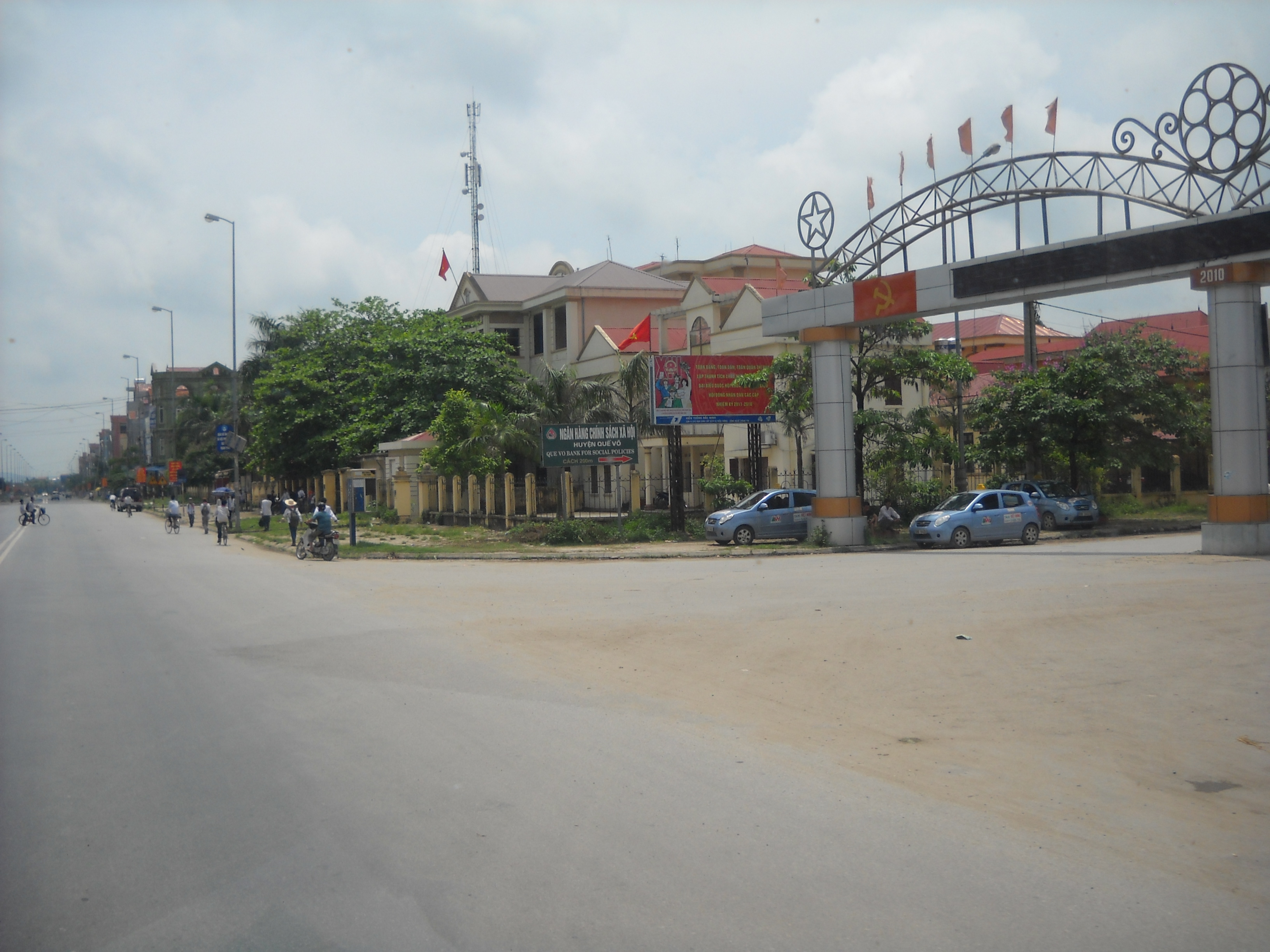
- National Highway 18 passing through Quế Võ Ward
- Interactive map of Quế Võ
- Coordinates: 21°07′30″N 106°11′40″E
- Country: Vietnam
- Region: Red River Delta
- City: Bắc Ninh
- Established: 16 June 2025

Government
  - Secretary of the Ward Party Committee: Phạm Thanh Hải
  - Chairman of the People's Council: Nguyễn Văn Tụ
  - Chairman of the People's Committee: Nguyễn Ngọc Anh

Area
  - Total: 23.51 km^{2} (9.08 sq mi)

Population (31 December 2024)
  - Total: 40,194
  - Density: 1,709/km^{2} (4,430/sq mi)
- Website: quevo.bacninh.gov.vn

Quế Võ is a ward (phường) of Bắc Ninh city, Vietnam. It is one of the 99 new wards, communes and special zones of the province following the reorganization in 2025.

== Geography ==
Quế Võ Ward is located in the following areas:

- To the east, it borders Đào Viên ward.
- To the west, it borders Phương Liễu ward and Nhân Hòa ward.
- To the south, it borders Bồng Lai ward.
- To the north, it borders Yên Dũng ward, with the boundary running along the Cầu River.

Quế Võ ward has an area of 23.51 km² and a population of 40,194, giving it a population density of approximately 1,710 people/km².

== History ==
The name of Quế Võ ward is inherited from the former town of Quế Võ.

The Standing Committee of the National Assembly issued Resolution No. 1658/NQ-UBTVQH15 on the arrangement of commune-level administrative units in Bắc Ninh province in 2025 (the resolution took effect on 16 June 2025). Accordingly, the entire natural area and population of the wards of Phố Mới, Bằng An, Việt Hùng, and Quế Tân were merged to form a new ward named Quế Võ.

On August 24, 2026, the National Assembly issued Resolution No. 39/2026/QH16 on the establishment of Bắc Ninh city from the entirety of the natural area and population of Bắc Ninh province. The resolution took effect on September 20, 2026. From that date, Quế Võ ward became part of Bắc Ninh city.

== Culture ==
In early March 2025, Quế Võ town (now Quế Võ ward) suddenly attracted attention on international travel forums as a top trending destination due to the positive effect of MV Bắc Bling performed by songstress Hòa Minzy. According to her special sharing, she called for the help of Meritorious Artist Xuân Hinh and 300 hundreds of Lạc Xá villagers to make the MV with the wish to promote the customs of her hometown.
