= Còn gì đẹp hơn =

2025 single by Nguyễn Hùng

Single by Nguyễn Hùng
- Released: 27 July 2025
- Recorded: 2025
- Genre: V-pop
- Length: 4:41
- Label: Universal Music Group
- Songwriter: Nguyễn Hùng
- Producers: Nguyễn Hùng; Tùng Giang

Nguyễn Hùng singles chronology
"Năm ngón bàn tay" (2025)	"Còn gì đẹp hơn" (2025)	"Kiếm đâu bây giờ" (2025)

Music video
- "Còn gì đẹp hơn" on YouTube

"Còn gì đẹp hơn" (lit. 'What could be more beautiful') is a song by the Vietnamese singer-songwriter Nguyễn Hùng. It was composed for the 2025 film Red Rain, which depicts the events of the 81-day Second Battle of Quảng Trị. The song's lyrics depicts a soldier's letter to home, expressing his desire of peace, and to sacrifice his youth to see it achieved.

On 22 July 2025, the song was presented to the public during a press release announcing Red Rain. On the 80th anniversary of the independence of Vietnam, it was performed at different concerts and events of varying significance.

== Background ==
"Còn gì đẹp hơn" was written by Hùng at the beginning of the filming of Red Rain. At first, it was only meant as a song expressing young love; however, after spending time with his fellow cast members, he added a few lines in the song regarding patriotism and love for the fatherland. He also said that his acting experience in the film allowed him to more closely understand the film's intentions, enabling him to translate the message into his work more effectively. On 22 July 2025, the song was first performed by Hùng himself at the film's official press release.

The song's visuals were also filmed concurrently with Red Rain in the same outdoor studio in Quảng Trị. On YouTube, the song was published on Galaxy Studio's official channel – co-producer and publisher of the film – on 27 July 2025, with scenes taken from the film itself. It was also released and promoted by Universal Music Group.

== Reception ==
At the press conference, "Còn gì đẹp hơn" provoked strong emotional feelings from the audience. Of its debut, Nhân Dân wrote: "With only a guitar, and a voice slightly trembling with emotion, Nguyễn Hùng sang as if he was a young soldier bidding a final goodbye to his village before enlisting. His performance produced a sweeping silence across the hall; some hardened veterans had tears in their eyes."

The song spread quickly on online platforms. Nhân Dân reported that by the end of July, it was already Top 10 of the Most Listened New Songs as ranked by Zing MP3, while the YouTube video garnered roughly 1.4 million views in the first nine days, demonstrating the public's great interest in the work. Hoa Học Trò opined that its simple but touching lyrics played a large part the song's popularity, helping it get to Top 1 Daily Viral Songs on Spotify Vietnam. Additionally, Billboard Vietnam Hot 100 also recorded the song as being Top 5 on its table as of 3 September 2025, and Top 4 of Top Vietnamese Songs. It eventually rose to first place in both, and would remain there for ten consecutive weeks.

Aside on social media, the song also received much attention on big performing stages. At the V Fest - Vietnam Today concert, the song, performed as a duet between Hùng and Vũ was described as one of the most surprising and emotional moment of the night; fan-recorded clips of the performance were shared extensively by social media users in the following days. At the 2025 Sao Nhập Ngũ Concert, the delivery of the song by Hùng and Bùi Công Nam was billed as one that caused "a million hearts to melt", and gathered hundreds of thousands of views on social media platforms. Numerous special television programmes and events, such as the programme "80 năm Hành trình Độc lập – Tự do – Hạnh phúc" (lit. '80 Years of the Journey of Independence - Freedom - Happiness'), which featured a mashup of "Còn gì đẹp hơn" and "Mẹ yêu con", only served to display its versatility across different visual media.

On its message, the song was considered by critics as one of the most notable songs connecting today's youth with memories of war and the value of peace. Nhân Dân wrote that the song was viral across many different platforms, and compared it to Nguyễn Văn Chung's "Viết tiếp câu chuyện hòa bình". It also brought the general populace – especially younger people – closer to Red Rain before it was available for public viewing.

== Charts ==
Chart (2025)	Peak position
Vietnam (IFPI)	1
Vietnam Hot 100 (Billboard)	1
Vietnam (Top Vietnamese Songs)	1
