= Nói dối =

2011 song by Phương My

Song by Phương My

from the album Đến khi nào hỡi anh
- Language: Vietnamese
- Released: March 4, 2011
- Genre: V-pop; dance
- Length: 3:55
- Songwriter: Lê Bá Vĩnh
- Producer: Lê Bá Vĩnh

Audio video
- "Nói dối" on YouTube

"Nói dối" (lit. 'Lying') is a song by Vietnamese singer Phương My from her debut studio album, Đến khi nào hỡi anh (2011). Written by Lê Bá Vĩnh, the song centers on a woman confronting her unfaithful boyfriend. "Nói dối" was panned by Vietnamese journalists for its poor quality; they labeled it a "Vietnamese music disaster" (thảm họa nhạc Việt) and compared it to "Friday" by Rebecca Black. The music video was uploaded to YouTube on May 2, 2011, and attracted criticism for styling deemed too similar to that of Lady Gaga. My also performed the song on music programs.

== Background and composition ==
Vietnamese singer Phương My began her musical career in 2006 after graduating from the Military College of Culture and Arts, but remained little known before releasing "Nói dối". Written and produced by Lê Bá Vĩnh in 2008, the song was included on My's debut studio album Đến khi nào hỡi anh and released on the streaming platform Zing MP3 on March 4, 2011. Before its release, My performed "Nói dối" on music programs such as Lời chào tuổi teen and Giai điệu kết nối.

"Nói dối" is a Vietnamese dance track that includes a rap verse performed by My. It opens with the word nói dối (lying), which recurs throughout the track. The lyrics center on the female protagonist reprimanding an unfaithful partner, warning that dishonesty will lead to contempt and the loss of everything. Bảo Anh of Tuổi Trẻ wrote that the rap section resembled a "mocking moral lecture", citing lines such as "One should be honest, do not lie / Do you know what lying brings? / Once you lie, you lose everything / You will lose everything, do you know?". (Note: Rough translation of Hãy nên thật thà đừng nên nói dối / Có biết nói dối là sao không hả? / Một khi nói dối sẽ mất tất cả / Sẽ mất tất cả, có biết không hả?)

== Reception ==
"Nói dối" was widely characterized as a "Vietnamese music disaster" (thảm họa nhạc Việt) by Vietnamese journalists, who panned its poor production and repetitive, nonsensical lyrics. Some writers compared it to Rebecca Black's "Friday" (2011).

Bảo Châu of VietNamNet wrote that the track echoed Phi Thanh Vân's "Da nâu". Writing for Sức khỏe và Đời sống, Phạm Quỳnh remarked that the title phrase was the only discernible part of the track, criticizing the rest of the song as "meaningless, incomprehensible, and bizarrely performed". Thanh Niên's Hiền Nhi criticized the lyrics as simplistic and rambling, describing My's vocal delivery as "stiff", "harsh", and "grating". In Người đưa tin, Phạm Khoa cited a comment that the song was like having "salt rubbed into [listeners'] ears". A VTV news report on cultural aesthetics cited "Nói dối", along with tracks by Phi Thanh Vân and Lê Kiều Như, as low-quality releases facing public backlash.

In an interview with VietNamNet, My defended the song, arguing that its melody was upbeat and its love-themed lyrics were not nonsensical. She stated that her intention was simply to bring lighthearted novelty to listeners and considered the "disaster" label an accident. In August 2011, streaming service NhacSo.net removed My's catalog following user complaints that her music contradicted domestic cultural values. In December 2021, rappers Hieuthuhai and Pháo released a song of the same name that interpolated its lines "Lying breaks the heart / Lying makes the heart hurt", (Note: Rough translation of Nói dối làm tim tan nát / Nói dối làm trái tim đau) and the original track resurfaced as a viral TikTok meme.

== Music video ==
After being released on Zing MP3 in early March 2011, the music video for "Nói dối" was uploaded to YouTube on May 2, 2011. There are three scenes in the video: My performing with two backup dancers, a male rapper performing, and close-ups of My in an iridescent pink wig and oversized blue plastic glasses that dominate her face.

The upload received a negative reception on YouTube, accumulating more than 14,000 dislikes against roughly 500 likes and reaching one million views by late July 2011. Media responses focused on My's outfit, which was widely compared to that of American singer Lady Gaga. In an interview with Tuổi Trẻ, My denied imitating Gaga and called it a coincidence.
