= Masew =

Vietnamese songwriter, DJ and record producer

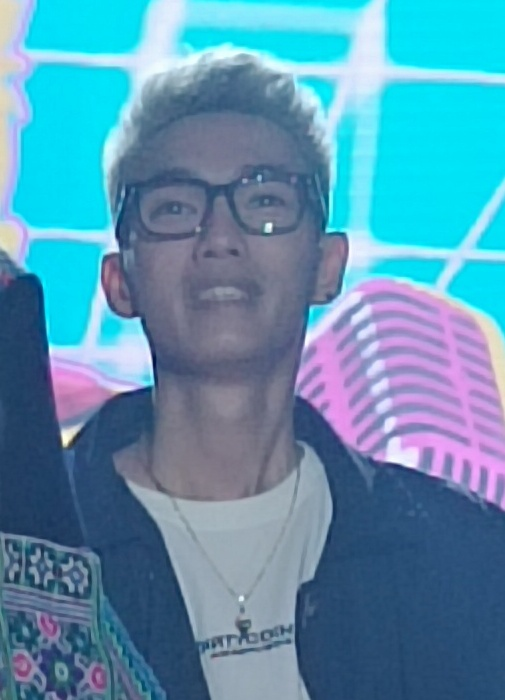
- Masew in 2023
- Born: Lê Tuấn Anh
- Citizenship: Vietnamese
- Occupations: Songwriter; Record producer; DJ; Streamer
- Years active: 2017–present
- Musical career
- Origin: Thành phố Hồ Chí Minh, Việt Nam
- Genres: V-pop; R&B; dance-pop; folktronica; EDM
- Instruments: Piano; organ; synth; FL Studio

Le Tuan Anh (born August 6, 1996), commonly known by his stage name Masew, is a Vietnamese male musician, record producer, DJ and streamer.

He is widely known to the public through the song "Túy Âm" with the participation of Xesi and Nhatnguyen. The song has received over 3 million streams on Spotify and over 200 million views on YouTube as of April 2024.

== Life and career ==
=== 1996–2017: Childhood and career turning point ===
Masew was born in Cẩm Phả city, Quảng Ninh province. Although no one in his family followed the path of art, his interest in music started early in grade 9. He began to learn and explore how to produce music. He often went to the Internet café near his school and the first melody he created was "Kìa con buom vang". After finishing high school, he decided to drop out of school. He worked part-time at a clothing store and made music in his free time. He started his music career in the underground music scene, producing songs and posting them on his personal YouTube channel.

Just a few years later, he received attention when he remixed songs like "Nếu như là định mệnh", "Có em chờ", "Điều khác lạ".

In 2017, Masew and Nhatnguyen composed the song "Túy âm", sung by Xesie, and the song was posted on Masew's YouTube channel. The song quickly became a sensation on social networks. Initially, the group only expected this work to reach 1 million views, but the popularity of "Túy âm" exceeded expectation. After only 20 days of release, "Túy âm" received more than 30 million views, and it reached 100 million views by March 4, 2018.

=== 2017–present: New career steps ===
2017–2018: Not long after "Túy Âm" was released, he released a new song called "Ở trong thành phố" in collaboration with B Ray and Hannah B. He collaborated with K-ICM and Đạt G to release the song "Buồn của anh", which quickly attracted enthusiastic attention and appeared in top trending searches. After 2 months after its release, "Buon cua Anh" had reached 100 million views on YouTube. Then, he, B Ray and Dat G founded the band Ba Cham. The band released songs such as "Xin" and "Thương nhiều hơn là nói". The group was active from the end of 2017 to mid-2018 when it announced its disbandment.

In March 2020, one of remixes of Pháo's "2 Phút Hơn" was produced by Masew.

On August 18, 2023, Masew released the music video for "Huyền vi" after a long period of "silence".

In March 2025, Masew produced the song "Bắc Bling" with Hòa Minzy and Tuấn Cry.

== Awards ==
- Winner: Favorite Indie/ Underground Artist Zing Music Awards 2018
- Category nomination: Mixing and arranging Green Wave Next Step 2018
- Tik Tok Awards Vietnam 2023: Most Outstanding Song of the Year: À Lôi – Double2T x Masew.
