= List of number-one songs of 2025 (Vietnam) =

List of number-one songs of 2025 (Vietnam) may refer to:

- List of Billboard number-one songs of 2025 (Vietnam)
- List of Official Vietnam Chart number-one songs of 2025
