= Bắc Bling =

2025 single by Hòa Minzy, Xuân Hinh, and Tuấn Cry

Single by Hòa Minzy featuring Xuân Hinh and Tuấn Cry
- Released: March 1, 2025
- Recorded: 2025
- Genre: Vietnamese folk; hip-hop
- Length: 4:05
- Label: HMZ Entertainment
- Songwriter: Tuấn Cry
- Producers: Masew; DJ Feliks

Hòa Minzy singles chronology
"Kiên trì là dì thành công" (2025)	"Bắc Bling" (2025)	"Nếp nhà" (2025)

Tuấn Cry singles chronology
"Mời trầu 2" (2025)	"Bắc Bling" (2025)	"Vươn mình kỷ nguyên" (2025)

Music video
- "Bắc Bling" on YouTube

"Bắc Bling" (Note: Subtitled (Bắc Ninh)) is a song by Vietnamese singer Hòa Minzy, actor-comedian Xuân Hinh, and singer-songwriter Tuấn Cry. The song was released on March 1, 2025, accompanied with a music video. Tuấn Cry composed the song with Masew and DJ Feliks taking charge of production, using traditional instruments such as đàn nguyệt, đàn nhị, bamboo flute, but in a new style with a fast tempo. The song is based on hát văn style combined with modern hip hop elements. The music video, directed by Nhu Đặng, recreates many cultural features in the Kinh Bắc region.

== Background ==
Hòa Minzy is an artist from Bắc Ninh and has been nurturing the project since early-to-mid 2023. In this project, she chose to collaborate with fellow musicians Tuấn Cry and producer Masew, who she previously had collaborated with on the song "Kén cá chọn canh" (2024), to compose and produce the song. Tuấn Cry composed "Bắc Bling" in about a week, and when he sent the demo to Hòa Minzy, she was "immediately satisfied" and came up with the concept right away. The name "Bắc Bling" is a combination of "Bắc Ninh" and "Bling", slang for sparkling and shining.

Following Tuấn Cry's suggestions, Hòa Minzy contacted comedian Xuân Hinh to invite him to contribute his voice and act in the MV. He accepted the invitation after hearing the idea and participating in the rap part of the song. Regarding this, Hòa Minzy said "Mister [Xuân Hinh] is also a son of Bắc Ninh. I think I have to invite [him] for the project to be truly meaningful and become more wonderful." Xuân Hinh affirmed that rap is not a problem for him because this performance style has appeared in bai choi, quan họ and chèo from previous centuries through rhyming, vibrato and rhythm, and that his performance of rap is not a breakthrough but rather bringing traditional art into the new era. In addition, Hòa Minzy went to the Anh trai vượt ngàn chông gai concert to invite Tự Long, another artist from Bắc Ninh, to participate in the project, but he refused due to being busy.

== Composition ==
"Bắc Bling" is a traditional folk song combined with modern electronic hip hop style. Masew incorporated many traditional instruments such as đàn nguyệt, đàn nhị, bamboo flute, but arranged them in a new style with a fast tempo. In addition to hát văn, the song also incorporates typical Northern singing genres such as xẩm and chèo. Part of the lyrics were inspired by quan họ verses like "Ba quan mời trầu" or "Người ở đừng về".

The intro of "Bac Bling" has the sound of kèn bầu and drums, along with four lục bát lines of Xuân Hinh about heartfelt connection to the place where one was born and raised. Hòa Minzy verse contains many tourism spots, with a part where she performs the lyrics in a high-pitched voice with a strong "quan họ" character. The men rap verses constantly mention quan họ features such as nón quai thao, hội Lim, etc.

== Reception ==
Following the song release, the keyword "bling" became a trending phrase. It reached the top spot on YouTube Music Trending Vietnam, iTunes Vietnam and Zing MP3 Realtime Chart, as well as the number 3 spot on Spotify Top 50 Vietnam within 24 hours of its release. On weekly charts, it peaked at number 1 on IFPI Official Vietnam Chart and Zing MP3's Weekly Zingchart, number 2 on Billboard Vietnam Hot 100, number five on Spotify Top Songs Vietnam and YouTube Weekly Top Songs. The music video has become the fastest V-Pop MV to reach 200 million views.

The project has garnered widespread acclaim from music experts. Thanh Hương from Lao Động praised the lyrics as "intimate" and said that there had never been a precedent for a pop song that "told the story of Bac Ninh's folk, cultural, and traditional music that created such a positive ripple effect". Quỳnh Như from Hoa Học Trò praised the lyrics as "trendy", and that the cultural transmission segments through rap were reminiscent of "À Lôi" by Double2T. She gave Masew's arrangement a 10 and said "the song marked Hoa Minzy's sparkling return by doing a good job of entertaining with 'youthful - playful - witty' colors". In her overall assessment of the music project, journalist Thanh Hà from Pháp luật Việt Nam praised the song for reflecting a matured artistic vision and delivering meaningful emotional value. She praised Hòa Minzy for proving herself not only as a powerful vocalist, but also as a serious artist whose work truly deserves attention. Musician Huy Tuấn praised Hòa Minzy for her outstanding performance in blending traditional folk music with contemporary crossover styles, noting that she has found the freedom to express her own musical identity, as previously seen in songs like "Thị Mầu". Musician Giáng Son commented that the song is "catchy and accessible to listeners", and that "this is a positive and effective way to promote culture through music". Xuân Bắc, Director of the Department of Performing Arts, commended Hòa Minzy and highlighted the standout rap verse by Xuân Hinh.

== Music video ==
=== Background ===
Nhu Đặng and Ngô Đài Trang took on the roles of director and screenwriter respectively for the MV "Bac Bling". The MV production process took place from January 13 to 15, 2025. After Hoa Minzy proposed the idea and plan to implement and launch the MV "Bac Bling" locally, many people and neighborhoods held meetings and implemented specific plans including assigning heads and subcommittees, so that everything went smoothly. In order to carry out the music project and film the MV "Bac Bling", Hoa Minzy asked for permission and was approved by the leaders of Bac Ninh province. The Department of Culture, Sports and Tourism of Bac Ninh, the Center for Monument Conservation and Tourism Promotion of the province and the Bac Ninh government also participated in supporting and creating favorable conditions for this project.

The MV "Bac Bling" features Xuan Hinh and more than 500 participants including dancers, extras and nearly 300 people of all ages living in Lac Xa neighborhood, Que Tan ward, Que Vo town. The MV production team discussed behind the scenes that "all the villagers were unanimous and happy to join [Hoa Minzy] in carrying out this project." Hoa Minzy revealed that previously, she only hired extras in her music products. However, with "Bac Bling", the actors participating in her MV were all relatives from the female singer's hometown. Hoa Minzy said that this was "an unprecedented thing." The singer revealed that although the actors participating in her MV received only "a bottle of fish sauce, a bag of seasoning powder, a pair of slippers and an insignificant red envelope", it was unlikely that they would cooperate like that even if they had a large budget.

=== Release and content ===
Before the music video's release, Hoa Minzy held a press conference to launch the product at the Lac Xa neighborhood cultural center on the evening of March 1, 2025. She and her family held a “village feast” to thank all the villagers who contributed to her music video. Artists from Anh trai vượt ngàn chông gai such as Jun Phạm, Duy Khánh, Quốc Thiên, along with Trúc Nhân and Rhyder, actively promoted the music video “Bắc Bling”. Additionally, models Đoàn Thiên Ân, Nguyễn Thúc Thùy Tiên, and Bùi Xuân Hạnh also helped spread the word about the music video by filming transformation videos on TikTok. Soccer player Nguyễn Văn Toàn appeared in a promotional video for the project and attended the music video launch event to support Hòa Minzy.

The music video “Bắc Bling” opens with images of a lion dance troupe and Hòa Minzy appearing with a conical hat, wearing a floral-embellished yếm blouse, a modernized ao dai, and a yếm-collared dress designed by Cao Minh Tiến in a style that blends folk and contemporary elements. Next, the MV shows a series of intimate images of people living in Bắc Ninh. The MV incorporates many images and tangible and intangible cultural heritages of the province, such as the worship of the Three Palaces, quan họ folk songs, the Lim festival, Đông Hồ folk paintings, and bánh phu thê cakes. The landmarks of Bắc Ninh featured in the MV include the Đền Đô relic site, the Quan họ theater, the Bà Chúa Kho temple, the Xóm Chợ pottery village, the Thôn Đoàn Kết pottery village, the Phù Lãng pottery village, the Dâu pagoda, and the Làng Hữu Chấp dyke. The music video features several customs common among Vietnamese people, such as chewing betel nut, blackening teeth, and the Vinh Quy Bai To ceremony, including a scene where an elderly woman in her late 80s smiles broadly, which some have likened to the “Bac Ninh smile”. Xuân Hinh appears in the music video wearing an ao dai, a headscarf, and black glasses, rapping and dancing. The scene where Xuân Hinh and Tuấn Cry sing back and forth to each other takes up a long portion of the video, inspired by Nhu Đắng's painting The Mouse Wedding. Next, the music video shows a head-butting dance segment and a moment where multiple generations of a family participate in festivals, including 300 guest characters participating in tug-of-war and worshiping Tam Phủ.

=== Reception ===
Ten hours after its release, the music video for “Bắc Bling” surpassed 1 million views and entered YouTube's top 3 trending music videos. One day after its release, the MV attracted 3.3 million views, rising to the top of YouTube's music trends and ranking among the top 11 most-watched videos worldwide within 24 hours. It reached the 42nd position in global music trends, the 21st position in music trends in Australia, and the 21st position in music trends in South Korea. On the afternoon of March 29, nearly a month after its release, “Bắc Bling” officially reached 100 million views, marking the first music video of 2025 to hit 100 million views and one of the fastest-reaching music videos in Vietnam. On the morning of May 22, the MV reached 200 million views after 81 days of release, the fastest in Vpop history. As of October 10, 2025, “Bắc Bling” has reached 266 million views on YouTube. After watching the “Bắc Bling” music video, audiences expressed their impressions and praised Hòa Minzy's dedication and hard work in creating a musical product promoting Bắc Ninh's cultural tourism. Many people noticed the landmarks and heritage sites featured in the MV and planned to visit Bắc Ninh after enjoying the song. To capitalize on the viral effect of the “Bắc Bling” music video, the Department of Culture, Sports, and Tourism of Bắc Ninh Province announced plans to organize free tours from March 8 to June 30, 2025, including visits to many locations featured in the music video.

Thanh Huong from Lao Dong commented that the music video fully captures the beauty of Bac Ninh Province, not only artistically but also culturally and socially. In the same newspaper, Huyen Chi noticed the trays of betel leaves with phoenix wings, which are rarely seen, and the scene of an old man smiling, reminiscent of the poem “On the Other Side of the Duong River” by poet Hoang Cam, which also praises the beauty of Kinh Bac. Hoang Van Minh believes that the MV has made a strong impact on digital platforms by breaking away from the typical formula of “filming–adding music–listing scenic spots” used in previous MVs by other artists. He asserts that more products like “Bac Bling” are needed to develop and promote Vietnamese tourism more effectively. Quynh Nhu from Hoa Hoc Tro magazine praised the MV for its “vibrant youthful spirit” and cultural elements that create “a cultural narrative that is both humane and retains a sense of familiarity.” Thanh Hà from Pháp Luật Việt Nam newspaper affirmed that not only the professional imagery but also the costumes helped the MV win the audience's affection by “combining a nostalgic touch with a bold, contemporary flair.” Through this, the journalist affirmed that the MV honored traditional cultural values “in a new guise.”

Neko Lê admires her colleague for her “playfulness,” while singer Tùng Dương believes Hòa Minzy is clever in utilizing materials from Bắc Ninh. He highly appreciates the film crew's aesthetic style of filmmaking. Musician ViruSs believes Xuân Hinh made a significant contribution to the music video, giving him “goosebumps” from the very first line. Both Giáng Son and Tùng Dương agree that the folk culture concept is not new, as it has been explored by singers like Hoàng Thùy Linh, but Hòa Minzy brings her own unique color and creativity to the project. However, the music video “Bắc Bling” also faced mixed reviews, with many people believing that the stylized song title was not only inappropriate for expressing the cultural theme but also detracted from the purity of the Vietnamese language. Nevertheless, the leaders of Bắc Ninh province still approved this stylized title when Hòa Minzy worked directly on the name “Bắc Bling,” and Giáng Son believes that the controversy itself is proof that the project has spread and achieved great success. At a meeting and dialogue with outstanding Vietnamese youth to commemorate the 94th anniversary of the founding of the Ho Chi Minh Communist Youth Union on the afternoon of March 24, Prime Minister Pham Minh Chinh mentioned the music video “Bac Bling” as a creative highlight that inspires and renews the culture rich in national identity.

== Awards ==
Hoa Minzy became the first Vietnamese popular music artist to release a music product in the place where she was born and raised. The singer and her project team received a certificate of merit from the Chairman of the People's Committee of Bac Ninh Province, Vuong Quoc Tuan, for their contributions in promoting and honoring the traditional cultural values of Bac Ninh. Sharing about the certificate of merit, Hoa Minzy said that this was her wish for many years and she "had more motivation for her upcoming artistic path. I have been working in the arts for more than 10 years, but when I received recognition from the provincial leaders, I was truly happy."

== Charts ==
Chart (2025)	Peak position
Vietnam Official Chart (IFPI)	1
Vietnam Hot 100 (Billboard)	2
Vietnamese Top Songs (Billboard)	2
