= Amee (singer) =

Vietnamese singer (born 2000)

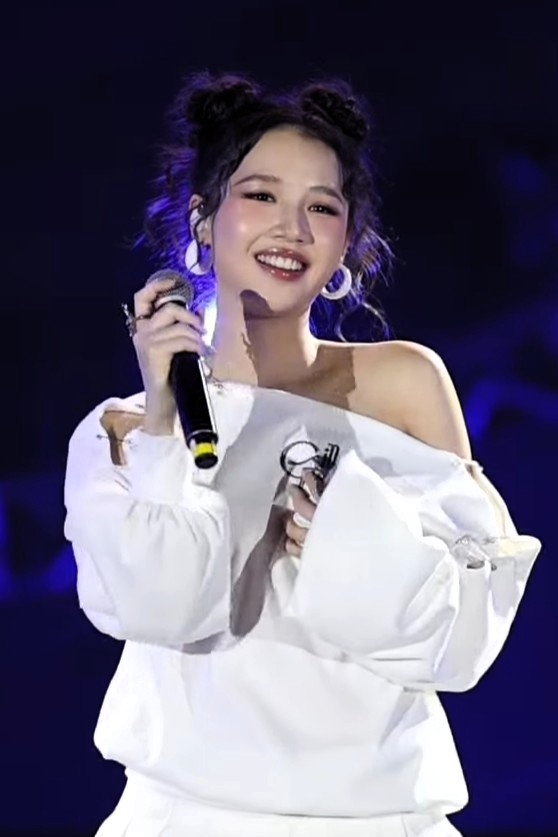
- Amee in 2024
- Born: Trần Huyền My; 23 March 2000 (age 26); Hanoi, Vietnam
- Occupation: Singer
- Awards: Mnet Asian Music Awards Zing Music Awards 2019 * Dedication Music Award 2020
- Musical career
- Origin: Hanoi, Vietnam
- Genre: V-Pop
- Instrument: Vocals
- Years active: 2018–present
- Label: St.319 Entertainment
- Website: www.facebook.com/ameest319/

YouTube information
- Channel: AMEE Official
- Years active: 2020–present
- Genres: music; behind the scenes; short video
- Subscribers: 163 thousand
- Views: 32.9 million
- Last updated: 20 Apr 2025

Trần Huyền My, also known as Amee (born 23 March 2000) is a Vietnamese singer. She first gained audiences attention in 2019 when she released her debut song "Anh Nhà Ở Đâu Thế" ("Boy, Where do you live?"). She is best known for being the first solo female artist from St.319 Entertainment. She was recognised as the "Best New Asian Artist in Vietnam" at the 2020 MAMA Awards.

== Life and career ==
=== Early life ===
Amee was born on 23 March 2000 in Hanoi. She was recruited by St.319 Entertainment as a trainee when she was 15 and was one of the first idols in Vietnam to have undergone a training period of four years. During her trainee period, she made an appearance in Nguyễn Trọng Tài, San Ji and Double X's music video "HongKong1".

=== 2018–2019: Career beginnings ===
On 15 October 2018, Amee made her official label debut with her appearance in fellow label group Monstar's "Nếu Mai Chia Tay". Amee then was formally introduced as a solo artist on 13 March 2019 with her solo debut teaser "dreAMEE (intro)" releasing on 1 April 2019. Her first title track "Anh Nhà Ở Đâu Thế" featuring B Ray released on 3 April 2019 which after two days, garnered 2.5 million views on YouTube and was trending second on YouTube Vietnam.

On 14 April 2019, Amee again collaborated with rapper B Ray with song "Ex's Hate Me" which gained her popularity within the Vietnamese community as the song garnered popularity on the YouTube charts five days after the song's release.

On 9 May 2019, Amee's second single "Đen Đá Không Đường" which featured B Ray in the Music Video. The video was trending third on YouTube Vietnam. Nine days after on 18 May 2019 also marked the first audio release of Amee's with her EP "dreAMEE" releasing as a timed exclusive on VNG Corporation's music streaming service Zing MP3. The EP was then eventually distributed on international streaming services and music storefronts Spotify, iTunes and Apple Music on 30 July 2019.

Amee released her fourth title track on 13 October 2019 with "Trời Giấu Trời Mang Đi". The song featured retired professional League of Legends player and popular Vietnamese internet streamer ViruSs, who wrote the song's music and lyrics. This marked ViruSs' first composed track to be released to the public. "Trời Giấu Trời Mang Đi" was also Amee's biggest breakthrough, garnering 4.5 million views in two days and being Amee's first song to top YouTube trending in Vietnam.

On 5 December 2019, Amee marked her first win in the Vietnamese Music Awards industry for Best Collaboration Music Video of The Year at the METUB WebTVAsia Awards 2019.

=== 2020–: Award wins, debut album dreAMEE ===
Amee continued her award-winning streak on 9 January 2020 at the annual Zing Music Awards (ZMA) for the Best Rookie of the Year award. A week later, on 18 January 2020, her second appearance in an OST was released with Huynh James, titled "Giận Muốn Chết Đến Tết Cũng Quên" for "30 Chưa Phải Là Tết'. During Lunar New Year festivities, Amee also appeared with rookies Han Sara and Xesi to sing Tết Đón Xuân Về at the annual Lunar New Year "Gala Nhac Viet" music show.

On 14 February 2020, Amee was featured on B Ray's EP Loser2Love in the track "Do For Love". The music video was a hit, with the video trending second on YouTube Vietnam for two days. Another featuring track with Amee was released two weeks later, on 25 February 2020 with Lou Hoang and Rhymastic for "1000x(Ngàn Lần)". Amee scored her third win at a music award show on 3 March 2020 at SCTV2's Làn Sóng Xanh awards for the "Top 10 Most Liked Songs in 2019". Amee then released her fourth single "Sao Anh Chưa Về Nhà" featuring labelmate and rapper Ricky Star. This music video trended at number 1 on YouTube Vietnam. Her fifth award was given at the "Giải thưởng Âm nhạc Cống hiến" event (translated as "Prize for Music Devotees", somewhat equivalent to Vietnamese Grammys) for Best New Artist of the Year. On 18 June 2020, Amee released her fifth single "Yêu Thì Yêu Không Yêu Thì Yêu" which was also announced to be the main track for her new album Dreamee. This track is Amee second single not featuring any other artist, and was trending first on YouTube Vietnam for two days. DreAMEE was released on 28 June 2020. On 6 December 2020, Amee was awarded the "Best New Asian Artist Vietnam" in MAMA 2020.

== Discography ==
=== Music video ===
Year	Day	Name	Album
2020	18/6	Yêu Thì Yêu Không Yêu Thì Yêu	dreAmee
2021	20/4	Nói Hoặc Không Nói	
2021	26/11	Miss Toàn Thư Bách Khoa	
2022	6/2	Thay Mọi Cô Gái Yêu Anh	
2022	25/5	Hai Mươi Hai (22)	Colours
2023	6/8	Chủ Nhật Boy	
2024	25/9	Cuộc Gọi Lúc Nửa Đêm	MỘNGMEE

==== Cooperate ====
Year	Day	Name	Album	Collaborated with	Note									
2018	15/10	Nếu Mai Chia Tay	Over The Moon	Monstar										
2019	14/2	Ex's Hate Me		B Ray										
2019	3/4	Anh Nhà Ở Đâu Thế		B Ray	MV debut									
2019	22/4	Phố Hàng Nóng		Kay Trần										
2019	9/5	Đen Đá Không Đường	dreAmee	B Ray										
2019	15/7	Anh Đánh Rơi Người Yêu Này	Thật Tuyệt Vời Khi Ở Bên Em OST	Andiez										
2019	12/9	Dấu Yêu Vô Hình		Osad										
2019	13/10	Trời Giấu Trời Mang Đi		ViruSs										
2020	18/1	Giận Muốn Chết Đến Tết Cũng Quên	30 Chưa Phải Là Tết OST	Huỳnh James										
2020	14/2	Do For Love	Loser2Lover	B Ray										
2020	25/2	1000x (Ngàn Lần)		Lou Hoàng, Rhymastic										
2020	5/3	Sao Anh Chưa Về Nhà	dreAmee	Ricky Star										
2020	20/9	Em Bé		Karik										
2021	23/2	Tình Bạn Diệu Kỳ	Diệu Kỳ Việt Nam	Ricky Star, Lăng LD	-	2022	6/6	Shay Nắnggg	Obito	Contains a sample from Mỹ Tâm's song "Hai mươi"|-	10/11	Em Về Tinh Khôi	90sHITS00sVIBES	Hoàng Dũng, Grey D
2024	8/1	Mưa Nào Mà Hông Tạnh	Dám Đam Mê Dám Rực Rỡ	Phúc Du		2022								
2024	3/8	Mộng Yu	MỘNGMEE	MCK										
2024	9/10	Thật Quá Đáng... Để Yêu		Nicky	Nicky's Debut MV									
2025	30/6	Từ 1 Sẽ Thành 2		Kai Đinh										

=== Studio album ===
Title	Album details
Dreamee	Released: 28 June 2020; Label: St.319 Entertainment; Format: CD, music download

=== Extended plays ===
Title	Album details
Dreamee (acoustic)	Released: 16 December 2020; Label: St.319 Entertainment; Format: CD, music download
MỘNGMEE	Released: 3 August 2024; Label: St.319 Entertainment; Format: CD, music download, streaming

== Filmography ==
Year	Name	Role	Note	Ref(s)
2021	The Guardian	Huyen	First role	

== Awards and nominations ==
Year	Award	Category	Nominated	Result
2019	Vlive Awards 2019	Rising Star	Amee	Nominated
2019	Vlive Awards 2019	V Fanship Community	Amee and fan	Nominated
2019	METUB WebTVAsia Awards 2019	Best R&B music video	"Đen Đá Không Đường"	Nominated
2019	METUB WebTVAsia Awards 2019	Best music video	"Anh Nhà Ở Đâu Thế"	Nominated
2019	METUB WebTVAsia Awards 2019	Best pop music video	"Anh Nhà Ở Đâu Thế"	Nominated
2019	METUB WebTVAsia Awards 2019	Collab music video of the year	"Trời Giấu Trời Mang Đi"	Won
2020	Zing Music Awards 2019	Discovery of the year	Amee	Won
2020	Zing Music Awards 2019	Favorite female artist	Amee	Nominated
2020	Zing Music Awards 2019	Favorite pop/ballad song	"Anh Nhà Ở Đâu Thế"	Nominated
2020	Zing Music Awards 2019	Most popular R&B/soul song	"Anh Đánh Rơi Người Yêu Này"	Nominated
2020	Zing Music Awards 2019	Most popular R&B/soul song	"Đen Đá Không Đường"	Nominated
2020	Zing Music Awards 2019	Most popular R&B/soul song	"Anh Đánh Rơi Người Yêu Này"	Nominated
2020	Zing Music Awards 2019	Most popular soundtrack	"Anh Đánh Rơi Người Yêu Này"	Nominated
2020	WeChoice Awards 2019	Breakthrough singer	Amee	Nominated
2020	WeChoice Awards 2019	Music video of the year	"Anh Nhà Ở Đâu Thế"	Nominated
2020	Green Wave 2019	Top 10 favorite songs	"Anh Nhà Ở Đâu Thế"	Won
2020	Green Wave 2019	New outstanding artist	Amee	Nominated
2020	Dedication Music Award 2020	New artist of the year	Amee	Won
2020	Dedication Music Award 2020	Music video of the year	"Anh Nhà Ở Đâu Thế"	Nominated
2020	Dedication Music Award 2020	Song of the year	"Anh Nhà Ở Đâu Thế"	Nominated
2020	Mnet Asian Music Awards(MAMA) 2020	Best new artist in Vietnam	Amee	Won
2021	Star of the year 2020	Female music star	Amee	Won
2021	Green Wave 2020	Female artist of the year	Amee	Won
2021	Green Wave 2020	Collaboration of the year	Amee, Ricky Star, Lyly, TDK, Hứa Kim Tuyền	Won
2021	Green Wave 2020	Album of the year	Dreamee	Won
2021	Green Wave 2020	Music video of the year	"Sao Anh Chưa Về Nhà"	Nominated
2021	Green Wave 2020	Breakthrough singer	Amee	Nominated
2021	Zing Music Awards 2020	Most popular female artist	Amee	Nominated
2021	WeChoice Awards 2020	Breakthrough singer	Amee	Nominated
2021	Dedication Music Award 2021	Artist of the year	Amee	Nominated
2021	Dedication Music Award 2021	Album of the year	Dreamee	Nominated
2021	Dedication Music Award 2021	Music video of the year	"Yêu Thì Yêu Không Yêu Thì Yêu"	Nominated
2021	ELLE Beauty Awards 2021	Best Face	Amee	Nominated
2021	ELLE Beauty Awards 2021	Best Hair	Amee	Nominated
2022	Green Wave 2021	Arrangement and Orchestration	"Tình Bạn Diệu Kỳ"	Nominated
2022	Green Wave 2021	Top 10 Most Popular Songs	"Tình Bạn Diệu Kỳ"	Won
2022	Green Wave 2021	Hot Trend Awards	"Tình Bạn Diệu Kỳ"	Won
2023	Green Wave 2022	Top 10 Most Popular Songs	"Hai Mươi Hai (22)"	Won
2023	Dedication Music Award 2023	Song of the Year	"Hai Mươi Hai (22)"	Nominated
2023	Dedication Music Award 2023	Music Video of the Year	"Hai Mươi Hai (22)"	Nominated
2023	Dedication Music Award 2023	Artist of the Year	Amee	Nominated
2024	Green Wave 2023	Hot Trend Awards	"Ưng quá chừng"	Nominated
2025	WeChoice Awards 2024	EP/Album of the Year	MỘNGMEE	Nominated
2025	WeChoice Awards 2024	Music Video of the Year	"Mộng Yu"	Nominated
