= List of number-one songs of the 2020s (Vietnam) =

List of number-one songs of the 2020s (Vietnam) may refer to:

- List of Billboard Vietnam Hot 100 number-one songs of the 2020s
- List of Official Vietnam Chart number-one songs of the 2020s
