= Dreamee =

dreAMEE

Studio album by Amee
- Released: June 28, 2020
- Genre: V-pop
- Length: 32:00
- Label: ST.319 Entertainment
- Producer: Hứa Kim Tuyền; TDK; Nguyễn Hoàng Mỹ Ngọc

Amee chronology
dreAMEE (2020)	dreAMEE (acoustic) (2020)

Alternative cover
- EP cover

Singles from Dreamee
- 1. "Anh nhà ở đâu thế" Released: April 3, 2019; 2. "Đen đá không đường" Released: May 9, 2019; 3. "Trời giấu trời mang đi" Released: October 14, 2019; 4. "Sao anh chưa về nhà" Released: March 5, 2020; 5. "Yêu thì yêu không yêu thì yêu" Released: June 18, 2020

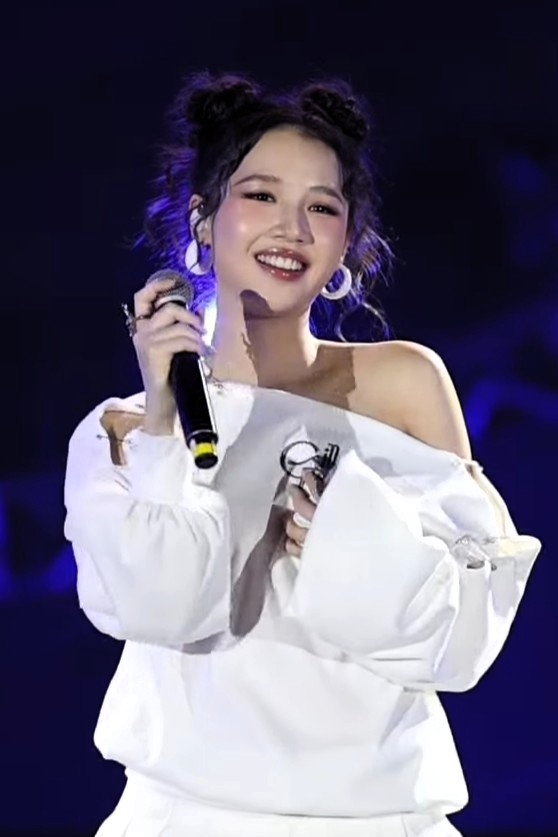
Amee, Vietnamese singer

Dreamee (stylised as dreAMEE), is the debut studio album by Vietnamese singer Amee. It was released June 28, 2020 by St.319 Entertainment. The album was released on digital platforms locally through Zing MP3 and internationally on iTunes, Spotify, Tidal, Apple Music and Deezer, as well as physically via CD. The album contains ten tracks, with six previously released from either Dreamee (EP), or from title track singles and four new tracks, explained as each track relating to the four seasons. The title track from this album is "Yêu thì yêu không yêu thì yêu".

== Background ==
After the release of Dreamee (EP), with tracks "Anh nhà ở đâu thế", "Đen đá không đường", "Trời giấu trời mang đi" as well as single release "Sao anh chưa về nhà", Amee announced on YouTube on March 31, 2020, that her full album under the same name Dreamee would be releasing. The album however was postponed indefinitely due to the COVID-19 pandemic. During this time however, Amee alongside the Ministry of Health in Vietnam released a revised version of Sao anh chưa về nhà, which contained references to socially distance and stay at home.

On June 11, 2020, Amee announced that her album will be released on June 28, 2020, with her title track "Yêu thì yêu không yêu thì yêu" released on June 18, 2020.

== Release and promotion ==
After the release of "Yêu thì yêu không yêu thì yêu", Audition Online's Vietnamese server prompted an in game patch update (titled as "Yêu thì yêu không yêu thì AU") which promoted the title track and the upcoming album's release by adding the song allowing for users to play as well as adding server exclusive in game items that are modelled after Amee's looks.

Amee's social media platforms then outlined a release schedule for Dreamee starting from June 21, 2020. On June 24, 2020, the album was made available for pre-order on iTunes and was made available to pre-save on Spotify, Deezer, Tidal and Apple Music. Thus, this marks the first Vietnamese album or EP to be available for pre-order or pre-save for any streaming service.

On June 25, 2020, St.319 Entertainment released a highlight medley which contained 15 second snippets of each song in the album, whilst also revealing the new song titles in the album.

On June 26, 2020, Amee confirmed that a physical version was made exclusive through local CD store Hãng Đĩa Thời Đại (Times Records) via a YouTube video.

On June 27, 2020, St.319 Entertainment uploaded a video with high-profile artists Tóc Tiên, Tiên Cookie, Nguyễn Hải Phong and ViruSs, to discuss and unbox the album as well as discuss about the album's sound.

Before the album's release at 7pm ICT, Amee held a press conference with her fans. On June 28, 2020, Amee's album Dreamee is officially released on all streaming platforms.

On June 30, 2020, Yeah1 News reported that the album has reached number 1 on Apple Music and iTunes Vietnam. The physical album has also reached 1000 sales in the first 12 hours of sales, marking the first Vietnamese female idol to achieve all three feats in under twenty four hours.

== Tracklist ==
Adapted from iTunes and Apple Music.

Dreamee track listing
No.	Title	Writer(s)	Arrangement	Length
1.	"Dreamee (Intro)"	Hứa Kim Tuyền	Hứa Kim Tuyền	0:39
2.	"Anh nhà ở đâu thế"	Hứa Kim Tuyền; Lyly	TDK	3:36
3.	"Yêu thì yêu không yêu thì yêu"	Hứa Kim Tuyền; T.R.I	T.R.I; TDK	3:10
4.	"Đen đá không đường"	Lyly	TDK	3:00
5.	"Mama Boy"	Hứa Kim Tuyền; TDK; Grey D	TDK	3:24
6.	"Trời giấu trời mang đi"	ViruSs	1HIT	4:13
7.	"Ex's Hate Me, Pt. 2 (feat. B Ray)"	Hứa Kim Tuyền; B Ray; Grey D	TDK	3:36
8.	"Sao anh chưa về nhà (feat. Ricky Star)"	Ricky Star; Hứa Kim Tuyền; Lyly; TDK	TDK	4:04
9.	"Xuân, hạ, thu, đông rồi lại xuân"	TDK; Hứa Kim Tuyền; Grey D	TDK	4:50
10.	"G9 (outro)"	Hứa Kim Tuyền	T.R.I	1:28
Total length:				32:00
