= Pikki Pikki dance =

Cheerleading dance

The Pikki Pikki dance is a viral South Korean cheerleading dance routine, popularized in 2022 by the cheerleaders of the KBO Baseball team Kia Tigers, based in Gwangju.

== Dance and music ==
The dance is simple: it entails moving each hand in turn in a thumbs-up position up and down. It is named onomatopoeically after the style of its music.

The music is from a remix by Indonesian DJ Prengky Gantay of "My Lecon" by the K-pop group jtL from their album Enter the Dragon (2001). The original song was written by Tony Ahn. "My Lecon" had been popular in Indonesia since its release. Gantay's remix was first popularised as part of a different TikTok challenge in 2021, the Olive Beat Dance Challenge, which then became popular in South Korea in 2021 as the Escalator Dance Challenge.

== History ==
The dance is performed by the Kia Tigers' cheerleaders when the team's pitcher strikes out an opposing batter. The dance then went viral on social media. The original 19-second video clip that popularised was uploaded to YouTube in June 2024 and soon moved to TikTok and Instagram. It featured a cheerleader, Lee Ju-eun, transitioning from fixing her make-up to performing the dance and then returning to her seat, all without changing her laidback, deadpan expression. The original clip has collected over 80 million views.

Social media videos performing the dance can involve people likewise nonchalantly transitioning from routine actions to performing the dance. The dance has been performed by people including Olivia Rodrigo and the Dallas Cowboys Cheerleaders.

The video brought attention to Asian baseball culture, especially in South Korea and led to the cheerleaders visiting other countries with similar baseball cheerleading culture, such as Taiwan.

== See also ==
- "2 Phút Hơn"
- Baseball cheering culture in South Korea
- "Caramelldansen"
