= Vietnamese-Japanese Foreign Language-Technology College =

College Foreign Language - Technology Vietnamese-Japanese
- Trường Cao đẳng Ngoại ngữ - Công nghệ Việt Nhật
- Type: Public
- Established: 2006
- Location: Bắc Ninh Province, Vietnam
- Website: https://web.archive.org/web/20130807012705/http://cnc.edu.vn/?setLanguage=en

Vietnamese-Japanese Foreign Language-Technology College is located in E6, Quế Võ Industrial Zone, Quế Võ, Bắc Ninh Province, Vietnam.
