= Pháo =

Vietnamese musical artist (born 2003)

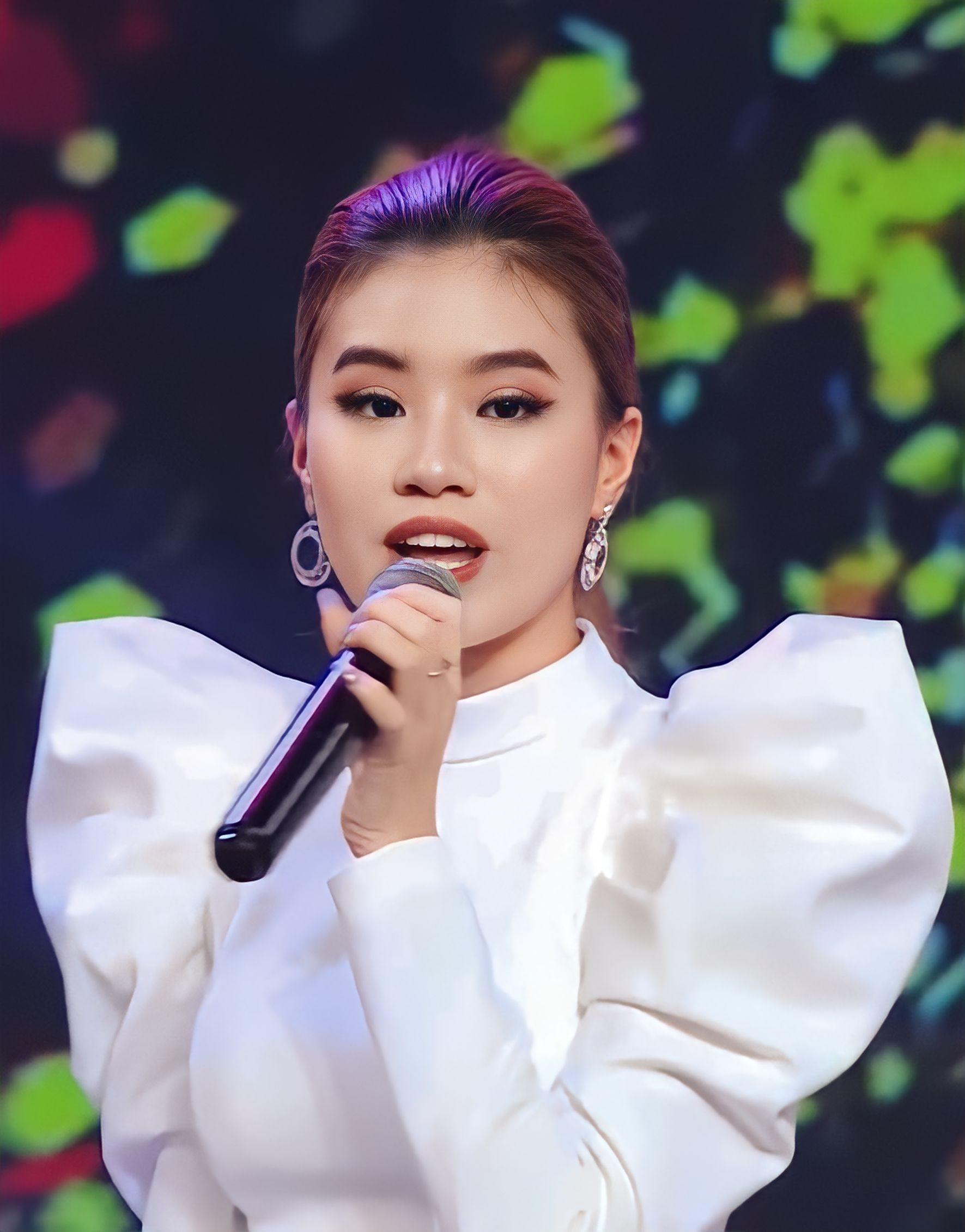
- Pháo in 2021
- Born: Nguyễn Diệu Huyền; March 28, 2003 (age 23); Tuyên Quang, Vietnam
- Other name: Pháo Northside
- Occupations: Singer; rapper; songwriter
- Years active: 2018–present
- Musical career
- Genres: V-pop; hip hop; pop rap; dance-pop

YouTube information
- Channel: Pháo Northside
- Years active: 2018–present
- Genre: Music
- Subscribers: 650 thousand
- Last updated: April 23, 2025

Nguyễn Diệu Huyền (born 28 March 2003), known professionally as Pháo, is a Vietnamese rapper and music producer. She was born and raised in Tuyên Quang. The name "Pháo" (lit. 'cannon' or 'firecrackers') was chosen by her as it symbolizes passion, while in an earlier interview she stated that it was derived from the name of a character in the sitcom Kim Chi Cà Pháo (Eggplant Kimchi). As of 2020, she was a student at the Hanoi College of Art.

Pháo started rapping around 2018. She has said she admires Cardi B and fellow Vietnamese rapper Kimmese. She was more known to the wider public after the song "2 Phút Hơn" with Vietnamese producer and DJ Masew, which garnered over 30 million views on YouTube. The KAIZ remix of the latter song topped the Shazam music chart. She also participated in the Vietnamese TV show King of Rap. In 2021, she released a new version of "2 Phút Hơn" with the American rapper Tyga, who is of partial Vietnamese descent. She has also collaborated with Bạch Tuyết.

In March 2025, Pháo released "Sự nghiệp chướng" - a diss track targeted at her ex-boyfriend ViruSs. In 2025, Pháo joined the Vietnamese TV show Em xinh "say hi".

On May 21, 2026, Pháo was revealed to be competing in Miss Grand Vietnam 2026.

== Discography ==
=== Singles ===
- "Hai Phút Hơn" (2020)
- "Vietnamese Girl" (2020)
- "2 Phút Hơn" (2020)
- "Sợ Quá Cơ" (featuring Ragakov) (2020)
- "Điêu Toa" (featuring Pháo) (2020)
- "Để Em Sống" (2020)
- "Nói Dối" (with Hieuthuhai)
- "Sập" (with Tez O.Alquimista and Megazetz) (2022)
- "Chất Cypher" (Prod.Chap) (2022)
- "Nai Vàng" (2022)
- "Kìa Bóng Dáng Ai" (featuring Sterry) (2023)
- "Trúc Xinh" (2023)
- "Một Ngày Chẳng Nắng" (2023)
- "Anh Phải Đi Tìm" (featuring Machiot) (2023)
- "Nóng! Hông Làm Quá" (featuring Độ Mixi) (2023)
- "Sự Nghiệp Chướng" (2025)

== Filmography ==
=== Television shows ===
| Year | Title | Role | Notes | Ref. |
|---|---|---|---|---|
| 2020 | King of Rap | Contestant | | |
| 2025 | Em Xinh "Say Hi" | Contestant | | |
