= Viết tiếp câu chuyện hòa bình =

2023 song composed by Nguyễn Văn Chung

Single by Nguyễn Duyên Quỳnh

from the album Viết tiếp câu chuyện hòa bình
- Released: November 2023
- Recorded: 2023
- Genre: V-pop
- Length: 5:05
- Songwriter: Nguyễn Văn Chung
- Producers: Nguyễn Văn Chung; Nguyễn Duyên Quỳnh

Nguyễn Duyên Quỳnh singles chronology
"Sắc hoa" (2018)	"Viết tiếp câu chuyện hòa bình" (2023)	"Tu tại tâm ta" (2024)

Music video
- "Viết tiếp câu chuyện hòa bình" on YouTube

"Viết tiếp câu chuyện hòa bình" (lit. Write on the Story of Peace) is a song composed by Vietnamese songwriter Nguyễn Văn Chung in 2023, and was first performed by fellow Vietnamese singer Nguyễn Duyên Quỳnh in an album of the same name.

The song was debuted in time for the 79th anniversary of the establishment of the People's Army of Vietnam. In 2025, commemorating the 50th anniversary of the fall of Saigon, it was performed at many concerts, programmes, and events of varying significance; for the national army parade, Võ Hạ Trâm and Đông Hùng presented it together in a duet.

"Viết tiếp câu chuyện hòa bình" has garnered millions of views on YouTube and other music streaming platforms. It was also the subject of numerous examinations at the end of the 2024-2025 school year. For their work, Chung and Quỳnh has been awarded a number of certificates and honours.

== Background ==
In 2023, Chung and Quỳnh wished to produce a music album to promote patriotism, and love for the homeland, for the occasion of the founding of the People's Army of Vietnam. However, they found that the album lacked a work that could clearly express the subject of the album; thus, the song was born.

Initially, Chung only wanted the song to be one suitable for communal activities, such that it could be sung by people with guitar as accompaniment. Upon reflection, he realised it should have an air of magnificence and heroism, and have much stronger overtones of patriotism, and revised it accordingly.

In November 2023, the song was composed in full. It later became the main work of the album of the same name, which was released by Nguyễn Văn Chung and Nguyễn Duyên Quỳnh. The album Viết tiếp câu chuyện hòa bình contained eleven songs; most of them were composed by Chung, while one was composed by Quỳnh. All were performed by Quỳnh; one was a duet with Nguyễn Phi Hùng, and another involved the help of the Ngày Mới Choir.

== Reception ==
Upon release, "Viết tiếp câu chuyện hòa bình" was highly acclaimed by critics, but remained little known elsewhere; it had a low number of YouTube views. It was only after clips of goals of the Vietnam national football team was uploaded to TikTok by Đức Tư, which featured remixes of brief excerpts of the song, that it met with wider public attention. Chung, Quỳnh, and Tư later collaborated to create a full remix version. From then on, it became well known amongst the general populace, and was much loved by fans.

On the occasion of the 50th anniversary of the fall of Saigon, joyously known in Vietnam as the 50th reunification of the country, the song was performed by many artists in different events across the entire nation. Additionally, parts of the song was cut and put into a high number of reels and other short clips on various social media platforms; some gathered over a hundred thousand views. On 20 April 2025, over five thousand university students performed the song at the event "Tôi yêu Tổ quốc tôi" (lit. I Love My Fatherland), held at the Community Centre of University Students of Ho Chi Minh City. Ten days later, in the national parade held in Ho Chi Minh City, Võ Hạ Trâm and Đông Hùng duetted the song together. In the eight days after, this particular performance achieved some 2.3 million views, and was the top 1 trending song in Vietnam on YouTube. There was some controversy as to the two singers getting to perform the song in such an important setting, while Quỳnh still technically held the exclusive right to perform the song; however, it was quickly cleared up as a simple misunderstanding.

As of May 2025, the song has garnered roughly five billion listens on online music streaming platforms and social media. Many schools in Vietnam included the song in their second term final examinations. Chung donated all proceedings of the song collected in April to war veterans. The song has been translated into multiple languages, including English, Russian, and Japanese, and was presented in the talkshow Tuổi trẻ HANU - Viết tiếp câu chuyện hòa bình on 27 May in Hanoi.

== Accolades ==
Year	Award	Category	Result	Ref.
2025	Vietnam iContent Awards	Most Inspirational Music	Nominated	
2025	Vietnam iContent Awards	Special Song of the Year	Won	

For his composition, Chung was awarded the A Prize of the 2023 Music Awards, held under the auspices of the HCMC Music Association, and the C Prize of the 2023 Literature and Arts Awards, held by the Vietnam Union of Literature and Arts Associations. In May 2025, Chung and Quỳnh were given certificates by governmental authorities for their tireless efforts in writing and promoting the song.
