= MCK =

MCK could refer to:

- Claisebrook railway station, Perth, Australia; Perth transit station code MCK
- Macair Airlines; ICAO airline code MCK
- Marist College Kogarah, Sydney, Australia
- McCook (Amtrak station), Nebraska, United States; Amtrak station code MCK
- McCook Regional Airport, Nebraska, United States; IATA airport code MCK
- McKesson Corporation; New York Stock Exchange symbol MCK
- McKinnon railway station, Melbourne, Australia; Melbourne transit station code MCK
- McKinsey & Company, informally McK
- Medical College, Kottayam, Kerala, India
- Moscow Standard Time, abbreviated in Russian as МСК
