= ViruSs =

Vietnamese YouTuber (born 1988)

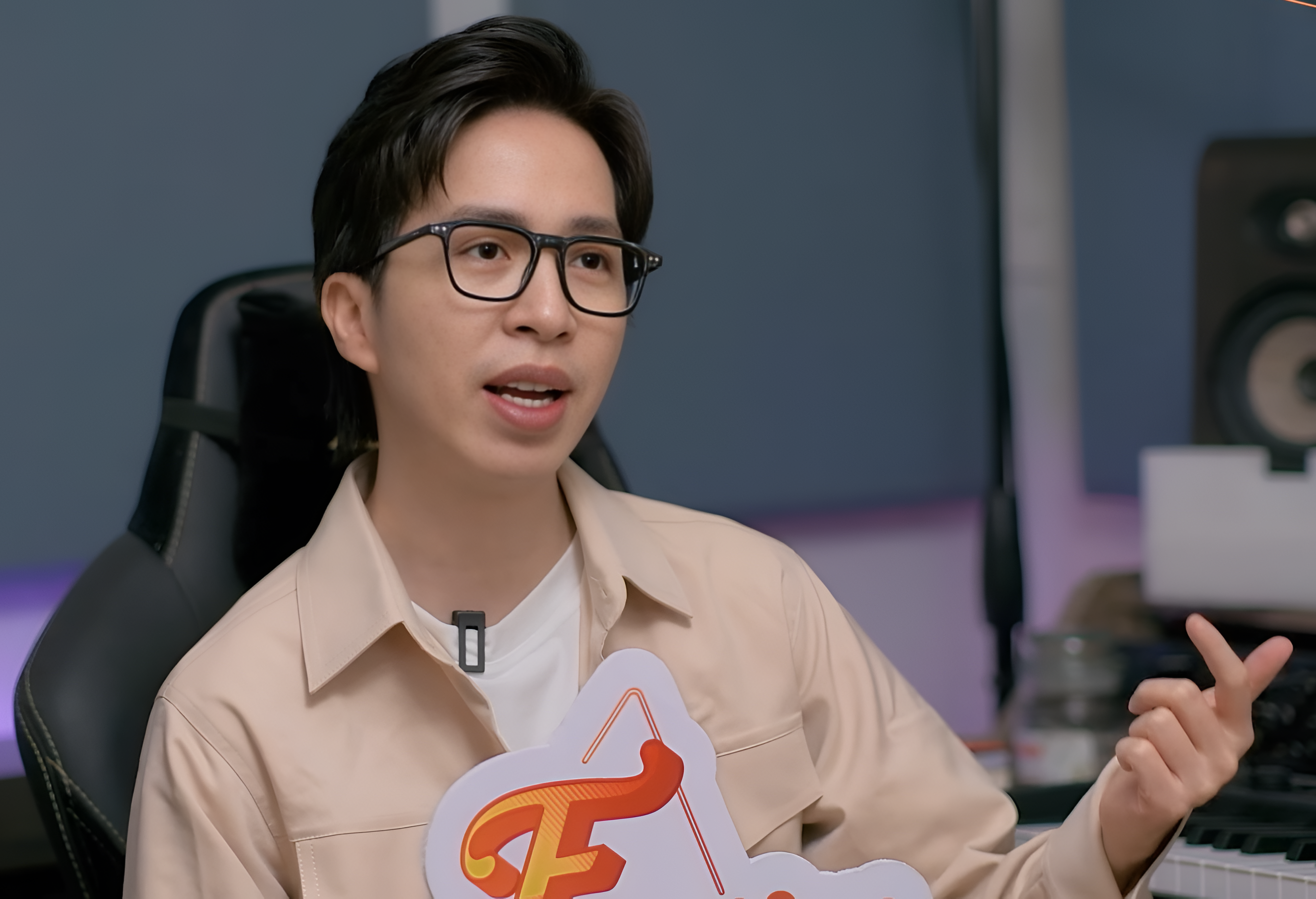
- ViruSs in 2022
- Born: Đặng Tiến Hoàng; May 8, 1990 (age 36); Hanoi, Vietnam
- Occupations: Streamer, YouTuber, musician, music producer

YouTube information
- Channel: ViruSs Reaction
- Years active: 2015-present
- Subscribers: 4.5 million
- Last updated: May 23, 2025

Đặng Tiến Hoàng (born 8 May 1990), commonly known by his stage name ViruSs, is a Vietnamese male YouTuber, streamer, musician, and music producer. Starting his career as a streamer in video games, ViruSs quickly moved into the music industry. With his influence in the online gaming world and a large following, ViruSs, along with PewPew, Độ Mixi, and Xemesis, are known as the "four kings of Vietnamese streamers".

== Biography ==
ViruSs's real name is Đặng Tiến Hoàng, born and raised in Hanoi in a family with relatives in the arts. Having studied piano since childhood, at the age of 15, he was sent abroad to study. However, his family encountered a major incident, forcing ViruSs to return to the country in 2007, making a living in restaurants and hotels and starting to get involved with playing games and being a streamer.

He then quit his job to become a streamer in video games and a commentator for esport tournaments. With his experience in the game League of Legends, ViruSs was the first person to experiment with streaming games on the Azubu streaming service. During his game streaming career, ViruSs has been labeled as Top 3 most followed, Top donated star, Top 1 PUBG and is considered one of the most famous streamers in Asia. In addition, ViruSs is also a gamer and captain of the Hanoi Dragons team - a League of Legends team in Vietnam. In 2018, ViruSs and PewPew appeared on the WeChoice Awards nomination list for the Hot Influencer category. At the same time, he was appointed as an Ambassador by Facebook Gaming, an online game streaming platform of Facebook.

Besides playing games, ViruSs also makes reaction videos (comments, reactions to a newly released music video). ViruSs's reaction videos are quite popular with the community.

In addition, ViruSs also participates in writing music. He has collaborated with a number of singers such as Amee, JustaTee, releasing music products such as: "Thang dien", "Troi cu troi mang di"... He was also invited to participate in a number of TV game shows and appeared in a short film premiered in 2020. On November 4, 2021, Bloomberg reported that streamer ViruSs became a community development consultant in the GameFi field for the Bholdus project.

On May 8, 2022, ViruSs officially announced that he would take on the position of General Director of 108 Gaming, directly participating in the management, operation and development of the company in phase 2.0.

== Controversy ==
In early 2020, ViruSs posted a reaction clip on his Youtube channel about the COVID-19 pandemic spreading in Wuhan, China. This video later became the focus of attention from the online community. Immediately after that, he was forced to post a correction, denying that he had posted the video and blaming his assistants.

In the reaction video to the song Black Swan by BTS, ViruSs criticized the image of a member of the group. BTS fans then reacted harshly to him. In response to the criticism, Viruss had to respond twice with extremely long comments. Initially, he apologized to BTS fans because everything in the clip was natural emotions. The male musician wanted them to let him naturally express his emotions in front of an artistic product. After being attacked more and more, Viruss asked the BTS fan community to stop forcing him to do as they wanted because the reaction clip expressed the most genuine views, attitudes and emotions of people watching the MV for the first time. His reaction to a music product was not to make money or serve others. Therefore, if he liked it, he would praise it, if he didn't like it, he would criticize it.

Not stopping there, ViruSs was also the center of discussion when he frankly criticized Hòa Minzy's weak voice, not suitable for Mr. Siro's music. He also said that the female singer should rethink her future musical path. In response to the criticism, he said that he gave such comments "only because he wanted Hoa to improve", and affirmed that "he would not dare to speak his mind because of any external factors" and have to accept the "peace is precious" and "no reward, no punishment" comments.

In early July 2020, ViruSs criticized Hoài Lâm's music video "Hoa no khong mau", saying that the song's arrangement was "good but not trendy". Musician Nguyen Minh Cuong, who composed the song, posted on Facebook questioning this. Immediately after, ViruSs apologized.

== Personal life ==
He had a 5-year relationship with Huynh Kim Ngan (Ngan Sat Thu), also a streamer in Vietnam. However, on August 10, 2020, Ngan Sat Thu announced that she and ViruSs had officially broken up. According to a post in her personal fan group, Ngan Sat Thu said the reason was because both were too busy with their own work, so ViruSs took the initiative to say goodbye.

In late March 2025, ViruSs became the center of public opinion again when he was caught up in a series of accusations from his ex-girlfriend Ngoc Kem, rapper Phao and many other girls. This incident quickly attracted the attention of millions of people on social networks. It all started on the evening of March 21, 2025, when Tran Nguyen Hong Ngoc, known as Ngoc Kem, livestreamed on social networks to accuse him of infidelity during the time they were still in love.
