= Quế Võ (town) =

Former district-level town of Bắc Ninh province, Vietnam

Coordinates: 21.133°N 106.167°E

- District-level town
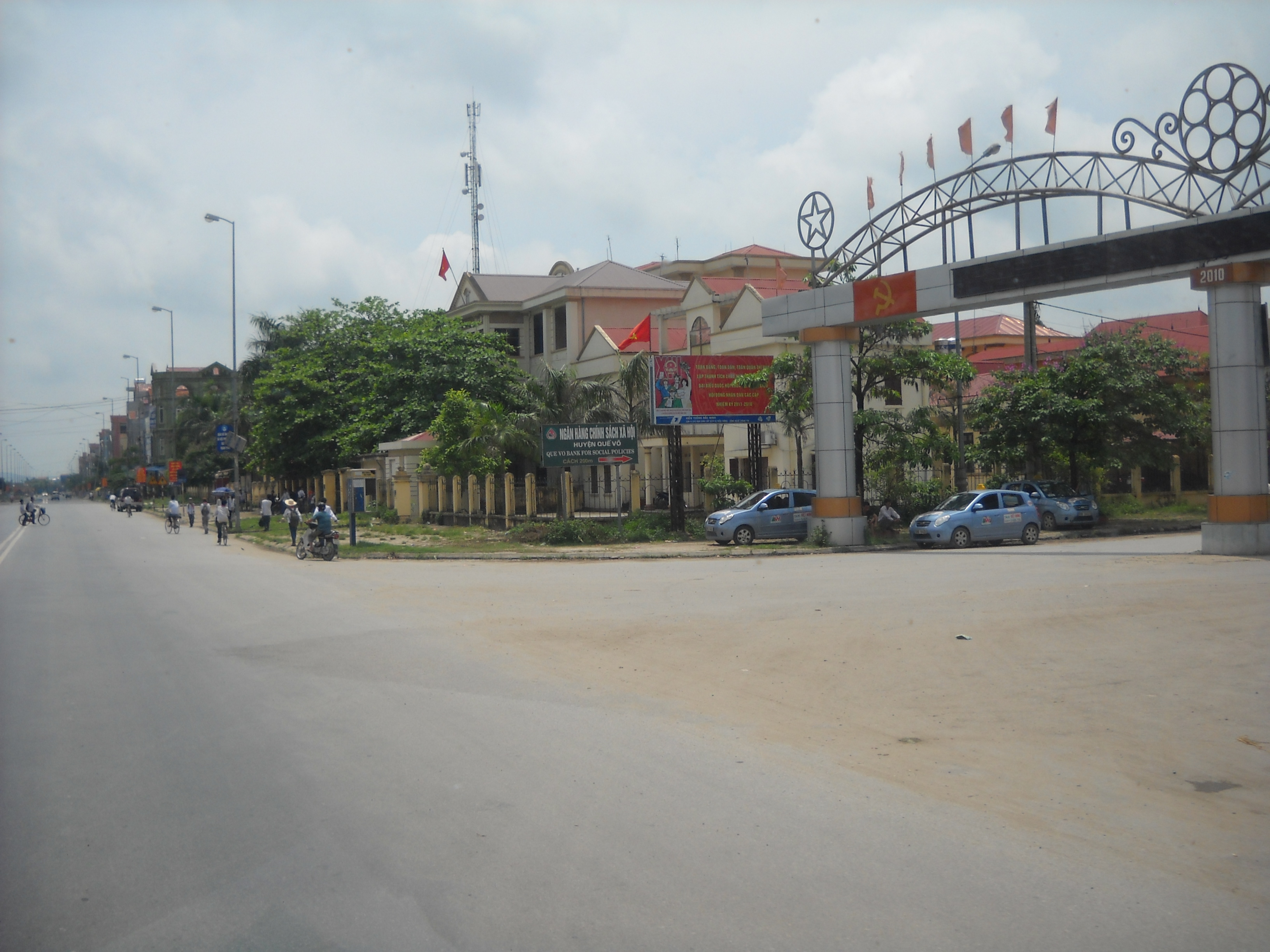
- An entrance of the Phố Mới ward in 2012.
- Nickname(s): "Land of Wharfs and Boats" (Quê hương bến nước con đò)
- Motto(s): "Bright – Green – Cleanliness – Beauteousness" (Sáng – Xanh – Sạch – Đẹp)
- Interactive map of Quế Võ
- Country: Vietnam
- Region: Red River Delta
- Province: Bắc Ninh
- Dissolution: July 1st, 2025

Area
  - Total: 155.11 km^{2} (59.89 sq mi)

Population (August 30, 2023)
  - Total: 223,964
  - Density: 1,378/km^{2} (3,570/sq mi)
  - Ethnicities: Kinh; Tanka
- Time zone: UTC+7 (Indochina Time)
- ZIP code: 16800 (Note: An official code from 2023 to present.)
- Website: Quevo.Bacninh.gov.vn; Quevo.Bacninh.dcs.vn

Quế Võ [kwe˧˥:vɔʔɔ˧˥] is a former district-level town in Bắc Ninh province, in the Red River Delta of Vietnam.

== History ==
According to Đại Việt sử ký toàn thư, before the Later Lê Dynasty, the entire area of modern Bắc Ninh province was called Võ Ninh canton (Note: The word can be understood as "the defense for the capital".) (Võ Ninh châu, 武寧洲), belonging to Bắc Giang prefecture (Bắc Giang phủ, 北江府).

Around the years of Quang Thuận, (Note: The unknown year by the royal chronicles.) the court issued a decree to merge two adjacent districts Quế Dương and Võ Giàng to become Quế Võ rural district (Quế Võ huyện, 桂武縣), belonging to Kinh Bắc garrison (京北承宣, Kinh Bắc thừa tuyên).

On February 13, 2023, the Standing Committee of the Vietnam National Assembly issued Resolution 723/NQ-UBTVQH15, which took effect from April 10, 2023. Accordingly, the entire area of Quế Võ rural district has been officially converted into Quế Võ town (桂武市社, thị xã Quế Võ).

== Geography ==
Currently, Quế Võ town includes 20 commune-level sub-divisions.

- 11 wards : Bằng An, Bồng Lai, Cách Bi, Đại Xuân, Nhân Hòa, Phố Mới, (Note: Before 2023, Phố Mới was still be a capital-township of Quế Võ rural district. Its name means "new street" in Vietnamese language.) Phù Lương, Phương Liễu, Phượng Mao, Quế Tân, Việt Hùng.
- 9 communes : Châu Phong, Chi Lăng, Đào Viên, Đức Long, Mộ Đạo, Ngọc Xá, Phù Lãng, Việt Thống, Yên Giả.

=== Topography ===
Quế Võ town covers an area of 155,11 km². In particular, all people are registered as Kẻ Kinh.

=== Demography ===
As of 2023, Quế Võ town had a population of 223,964.

== Culture ==
In early March 2025, Quế Võ town suddenly attracted attention on international travel forums as a top trending destination due to the positive effect of MV Bắc Bling performed by songstress Hòa Minzy. According to her special sharing, she called for the help of Meritorious Artist Xuân Hinh and 300 hundreds of Lạc Xá villagers to make the MV with the wish to promote the customs of her hometown.

Phù Lãng ceramic & porcelain village

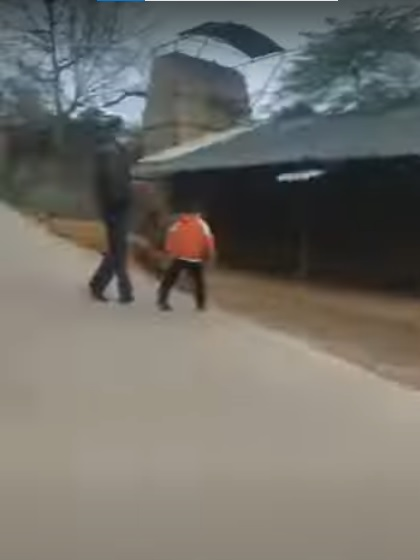

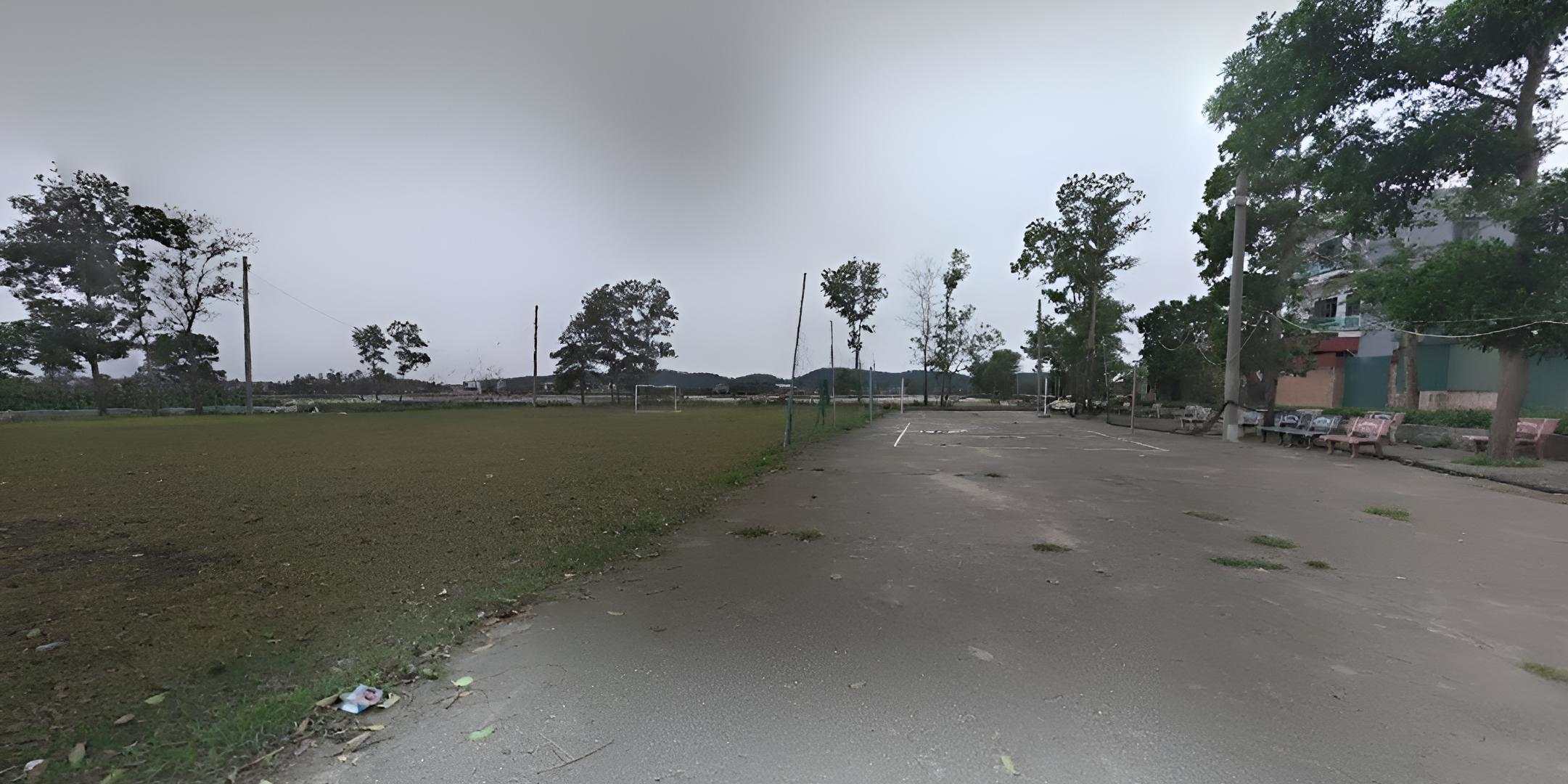

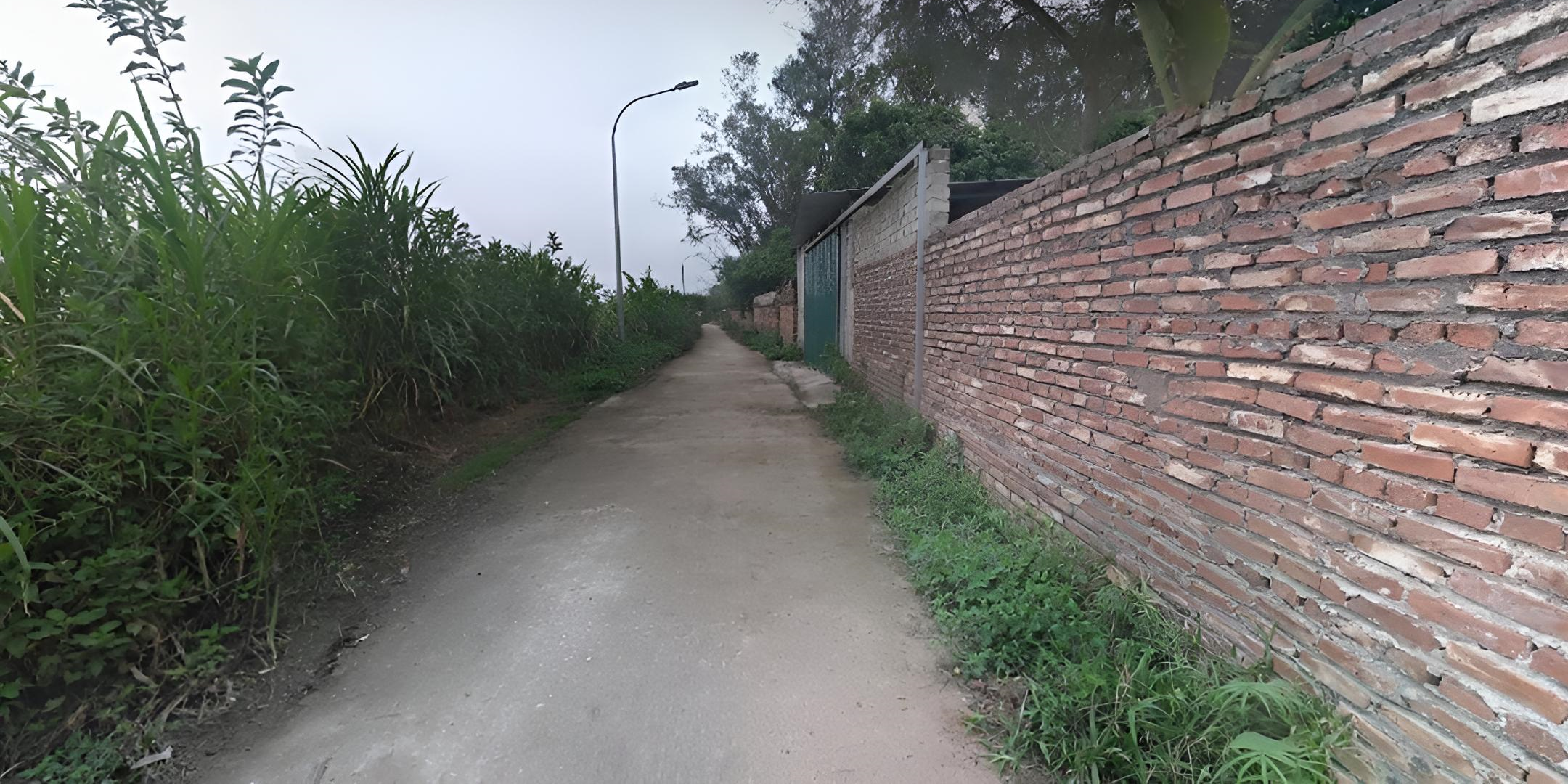

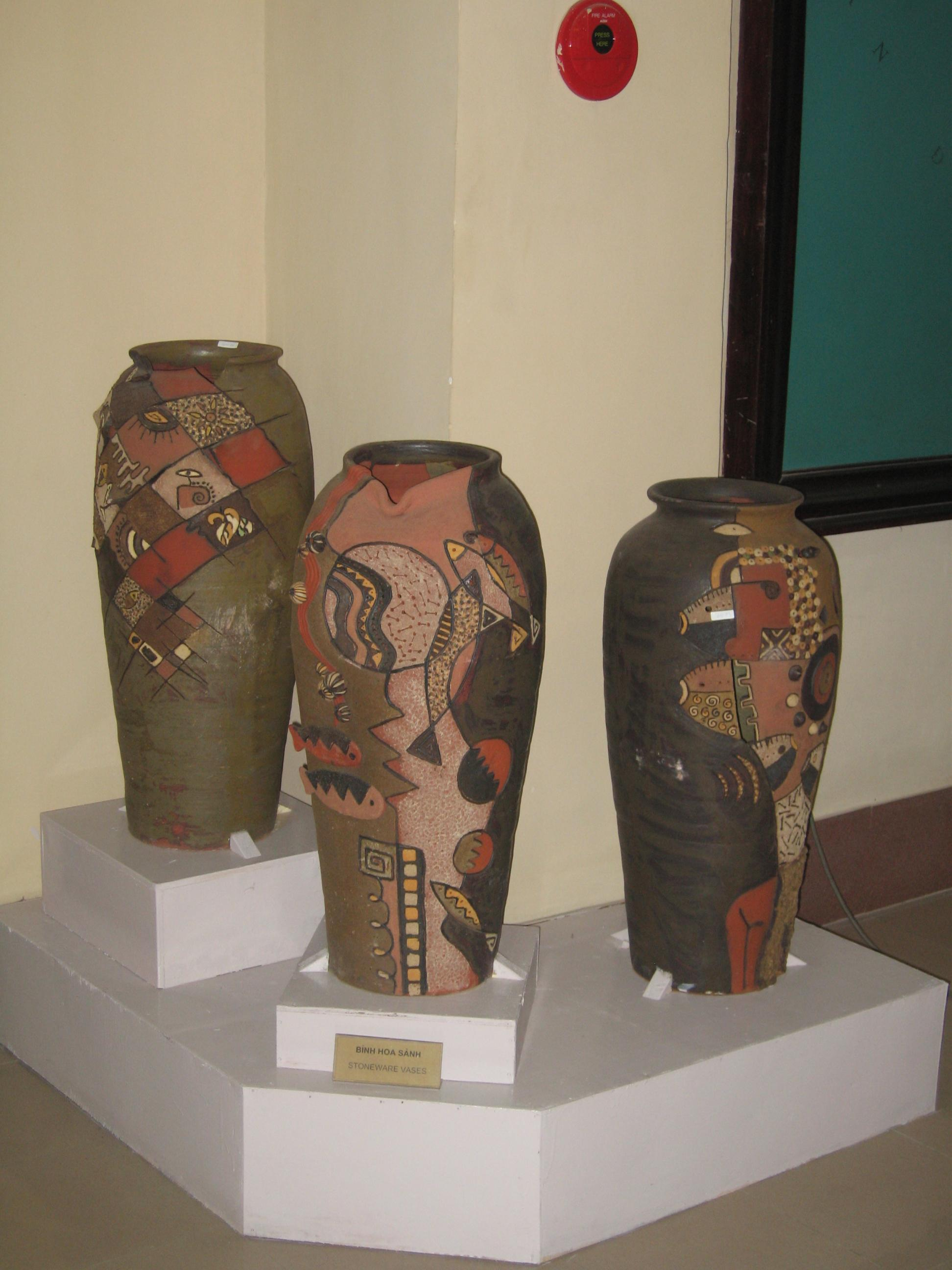

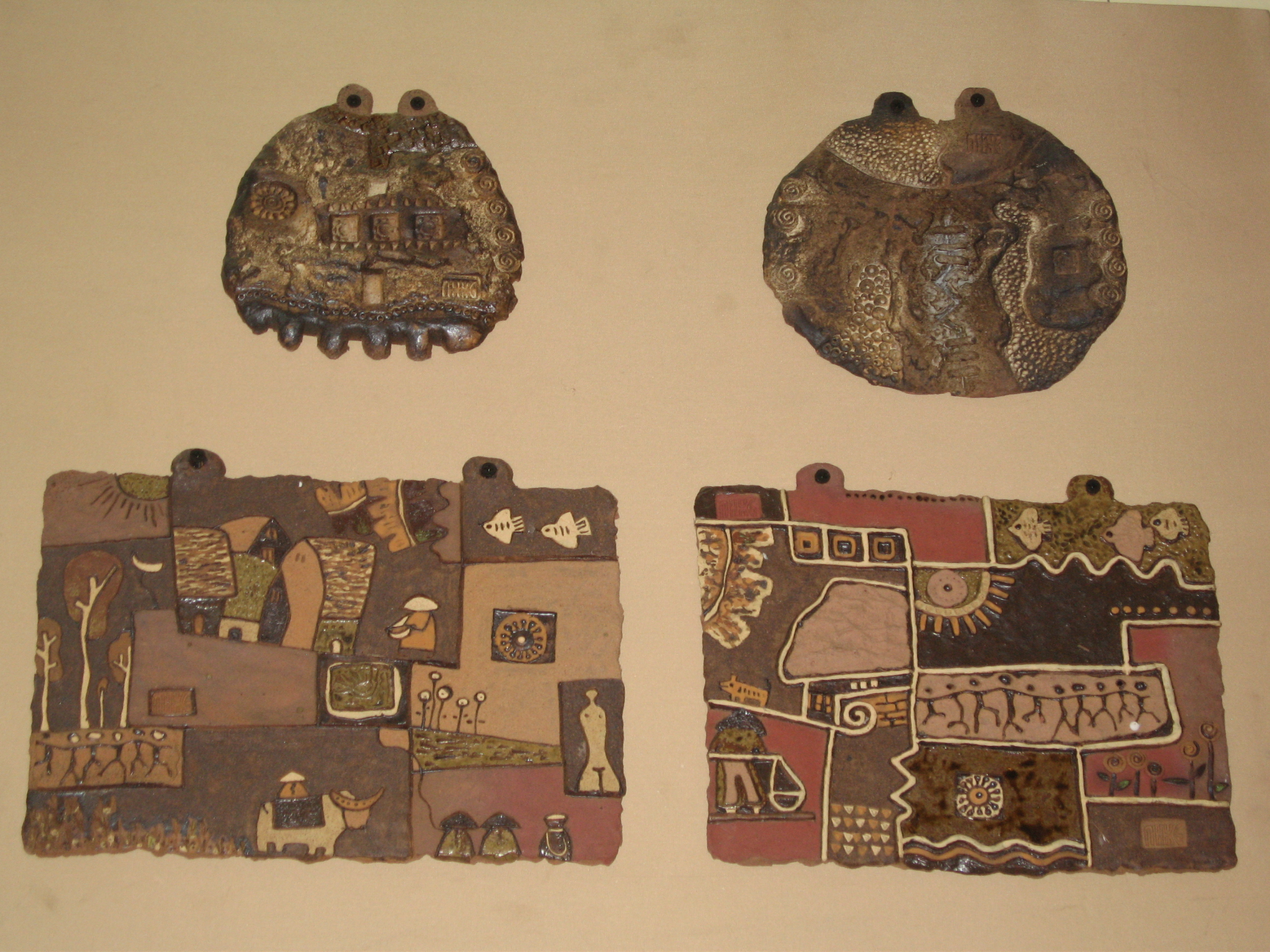

Vietnamese-Japanese Foreign Language-Technology College

== Economy ==
- Quế Võ Industrial Zone

== See also ==
- Chí Linh
- Gia Bình
- Lương Tài
- Tiên Du
- Thuận Thành
- Từ Sơn
- Việt Yên
- Yên Dũng
- Yên Phong
