= 2 Phút Hơn =

2020 single by Pháo

"2 Phút Hơn (Kaiz Remix)"

Single by Pháo
- Language: Vietnamese
- Released: November 28, 2020
- Recorded: 2020
- Genre: Pop; Melbourne bounce; slap house
- Length: 3:04
- Label: Spinnin
- Songwriter: Nguyễn Diệu Huyền
- Producer: Kaiz

Music video
- "2 Phút Hơn (Kaiz Remix)" on YouTube

"2 Phút Hơn" [haːj˧˧ fut̚˧˦ həːn˧˧] (lit. 'over two minutes') is a 2020 Vinahouse house song by Pháo. Several remixes of the song were made. One by DJ/producer Kaiz was released on November 28, 2020, and gained global popularity, one of a number of Vietnamese songs to become popular on TikTok through its dance covers.

The Kaiz remix reached the top 10 on Spotify's Global Viral chart, and became the world's most searched for track on Shazam in December 2020.

== Internet meme ==
An anime music video of the song, containing Zero Two of the Japanese television series Darling in the Franxx doing a hip-swaying dance, went viral, leading to an internet meme.

A trend, starting in China, then saw users on Douyin mimicking the dance in real life. The Douyin user Cciinnn first used the song in a video. The dance has been performed by several K-pop idols, such as Aespa.

== Other remixes ==
In 2021, Pháo and Kaiz released a subsequent remix of the song under the name "2 Phút Hơn (Make It Hot)" with the US rapper Tyga.

== Chart performance ==
Chart performance for "2 Phút Hơn"
Chart (2021)	Peak position
US Hot Dance/Electronic Songs (Billboard)	39
US World Digital Song Sales (Billboard)	10

== Certifications ==
Certifications for "2 Phút Hơn"
Region	Certification	Certified units/sales
Poland (ZPAV)	Platinum	50,000^{‡}
^{‡} Sales+streaming figures based on certification alone.

== See also ==
- List of Internet phenomena
- Caramelldansen
- Loituma Girl
- Nyan Cat
- Pikki Pikki dance
- See Tình
- Shukusei!! Loli Kami Requiem
