= PewPew (streamer) =

Vietnamese streamer from Haiphong (born 1991)

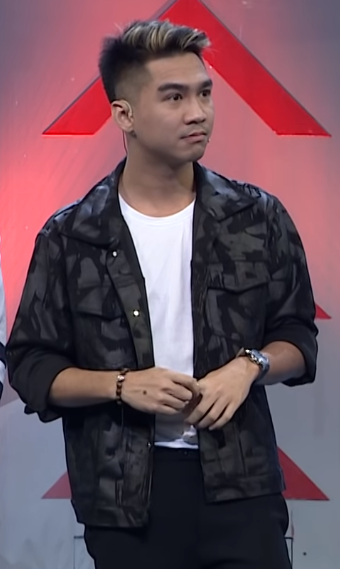
- PewPew in 2019
- Born: Hoàng Văn Khoa; June 23, 1991 (age 35); Hải Phòng, Vietnam
- Occupations: Streamer; YouTuber

YouTube information
- Channel: PewPew
- Years active: 2012–present
- Genres: Entertainment; video games
- Subscribers: 3.7 million
- Views: 395 million
- Last updated: 4 August 2026

Hoàng Văn Khoa (born June 23, 1991, in Kiến An, Hải Phòng), known online as PewPew, is a Vietnamese YouTuber and streamer known for his Let's Play videos and comedic formatted videos and shows. In 2012, PewPew was in the first phase of bringing the concept of online streaming to Vietnamese online community. And then famous for commenting on games like Dota 2, League of Legends and some TV shows. He also acted in the movie Nụ hôn ký ức..

== Biography ==
Hoàng Văn Khoa was born on June 23, 1991, in Kiến An, Hải Phòng, currently living and working in Ho Chi Minh City.

In ninth grade, Khoa was taken by his parents to Australia to study abroad and then continued to study accounting.

In 2012, Khoa returned to Vietnam to start his career as a streamer with the game Dota 2, nicknamed "PewPew". His goal is to popularize the game Dota 2 in Vietnam with the desire to have at least 1 million participants. In the early years, PewPew's videos had very few views. Undeterred, PewPew opened PewPew Studio at home, released new videos regularly, and gradually gained a foothold in the Vietnamese community YouTuber.

Around 2016, PewPew added new content such as talkshow and late night talk.

In 2018, PewPew partnered with a former colleague to open a PewPew Vietnamese bread shop in the Tan Binh district, Ho Chi Minh City. To date, the PewPew bakery has expanded to three locations, however the third one closed at the end of December 2019.

At the end of 2020, PewPew joined the talk show Net Night (Episode 7), sharing hidden corners about streamer work, giving many positive messages to the community and fans.

== Retirement ==
On March 31, 2019, PewPew announced to stop streamer work to focus on business. Originally, he shared: "From tomorrow I can live a normal life. 8 hour work day, weekend go out or go with friends. Get a good night's sleep without fear of missing work. A time to remember. If you're young, live to be 30, think back and smile."

== TV show participated ==
- Mảnh ghép tình yêu
- Bữa trưa vui vẻ
- Tường lửa
- Trí lực sánh đôi
- Hẹn ngay đi
- Chuyện đêm muộn
- Bộ ba siêu đẳng
- Lightning Quiz
- Giọng ải giọng ai
- Ô hay gì thế này
- Xạ thủ đua tài 2020
- Net Đêm Tập 7 (POPs eSports)
- Bar Stories Tập 34 (Dustin On The Go)

== Promotional film ==
- Điệp vụ mùng 1 tết
- Điệp vụ vinh quang
- Điệp vụ AFF
- 12 con giáp
