= Zing MP3 =

Vietnamese Digital music company release in 2007

- Screenshot
- Available in: Vietnamese
- Headquarters: {{{location_country}}}
- Owner: VNG
- Founder: Vương Quang Khải
- Website: www.zingmp3.vn
- Registration: Obligatory
- Users: 10 million (As of 2012); 28 million regular users (As of 2023)
- Launched: 1 August 2007; 19 years ago

Zing MP3 is a digital music service belonging to the Zing system, managed and operated by VNG. First launched in 2007, To date, Zing MP3 is considered one of the largest online music websites in Vietnam.

Zing Music Awards is the first online music award in Vietnam, launched in September 2010 by Zing. The award was created to recognize and honor artists who have made significant contributions to the online music market. The award is held annually.

== History ==
Zing MP3 was officially launched in November 2007 as the first product in VNG's Zing system. In March 2011, the Zing MP3 application was launched and supported on mobile operating systems iOS, Android, and Windows Phone, as well as Sony Internet TVs in September of the same year.

== Features ==
Zing MP3's current features include free high-quality 320 Kbps music streaming, karaoke, music rooms, following artists' profiles, an automatic search system, AI-powered music retrieval, updates to new song lists and artists, music videos based on listener needs, and the ability to download and embed song links on various websites or send favorite songs to friends. In addition, Zing MP3 also owns the largest Vietnamese music library with over 85% of Vietnamese music copyrights, of which about 80% are exclusive releases and regularly signs cooperation agreements with many different artists and music companies to release exclusive music on the platform.

== Effect ==
Zing MP3 is considered one of the largest online music websites in Vietnam. Upon its launch, Zing MP3 ushered in a new trend in music listening and quickly became the number one music website, ranking among the top 1,000 most visited websites in the world and the top 50 most visited websites in Vietnam, according to Alexa, just 45 days after its launch. According to statistics from 2012, the service had 10 million users, with an average of 7.1 million songs, 1.95 million videos, and 1.85 million albums listened to and viewed daily. Since its release, the Zing MP3 app has consistently ranked among the top 3 most installed apps on various app stores.

== Copyright dispute ==
In December 2018, The singer Duy Mạnh filed a lawsuit against Zing MP3, accusing them of illegally uploading hundreds of his songs. Initially, Zing demanded 500 million VND in compensation, which was refused. The amount was later revealed to be 1 billion VND, but Duy Mạnh demanded 1.5 billion VND, threatening legal action if payment was not made. Immediately, Zing MP3 removed all information and songs related to the singer from its platform.

== Award ==
Year	Award	Category	Result	Ref
2014	Most Popular Mobile Product of the Year Voting Program	Most Popular Mobile Content Service	Won	
