= Official Vietnam Chart =

Record chart in Vietnam

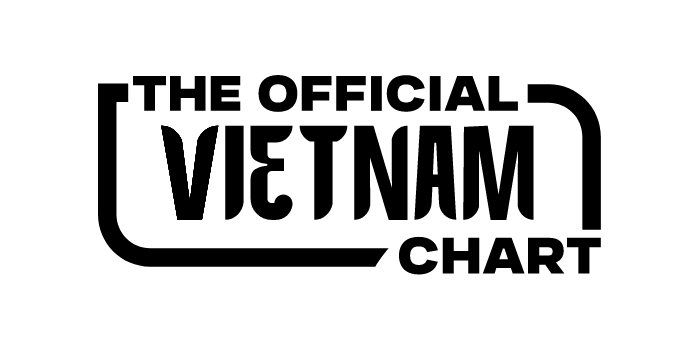
The Official Vietnam Chart logo

The Official Vietnam Chart is a record chart launched in 2025 by the International Federation of the Phonographic Industry (IFPI). Based on data from BMAT, the chart reflects the 20 most-streamed songs in Vietnam. It is a part of the Official Southeast Asia Charts, a collection of record charts by the IFPI in six Southeast Asian (SEA) countries.

== History ==
As part of the Official Southeast Asia Charts, the Official Vietnam Chart was launched on 23 January 2025 by the International Federation of the Phonographic Industry (IFPI). According to the IFPI, it is the first industry-backed charts in Vietnam. The first number-one song on the chart was Dương Domic's "Mất Kết Nối" for the week of 16 January 2025.

== Methodology ==
The chart tracks streams from Apple Music, Deezer, Spotify, and YouTube Music. Streams are weighted to take into account differences between streams from free or paid accounts. Data from BMAT are collected weekly from Friday to Thursday, with charts of the 20 most-streamed songs published the following Tuesday on the official website and social media platforms. Music downloads and purchases of physical music do not count towards the charts, and different versions or remixes of songs are grouped together for charting purposes. To be eligible to chart, more than 30 seconds of a song must be streamed. The data collection week runs from Friday to Thursday, with the charts released at officialseacharts.com and on the Official Southeast Asia Instagram and Facebook accounts the following Tuesday.

== List of number-one songs ==
The following songs have all been number one on the chart:

Key
| No. | nth song to top the chart |
| re | Return of a song to number one |

=== 2025 ===
| No. | Week ending date | Title | Artist(s) | Wks. |
|---|---|---|---|---|
| 1 | 16 January | "Mất kết nối" | Dương Domic | 4 |
| 2 | 13 February | "Dù cho tận thế" | Erik | 1 |
| re | 20 February | "Mất kết nối" | Dương Domic | 3 |
| 3 | 13 March | "Bắc Bling" | Hòa Minzy | 9 |
| 4 | 15 May | "Phép màu" | Maydays feat. Minh Tốc | 9 |
| 5 | 17 July | "Jump" | Blackpink | 1 |
| re | 24 July | "Phép màu" | Maydays feat. Minh Tốc | 2 |
| 6 | 7 August | "Kho báu" | (S)Trong | 4 |
| 7 | 4 September | "Còn gì đẹp hơn" | Nguyễn Hùng | 5 |
| 8 | 9 October | "The Fate of Ophelia" | Taylor Swift | 2 |
| 9 | 23 October | "E là không thể" | Anh Quân Idol | 1 |
| 10 | 30 October | "Chẳng phải tình đầu sao đau đến thế" | Min feat. Dangrangto and Antransax | 1 |
| 11 | 6 November | "Người đầu tiên" | Juky San | 3 |
| re | 27 November | "Chẳng phải tình đầu sao đau đến thế" | Min feat. Dangrangto and Antransax | 1 |
| re | 4 December | "Người đầu tiên" | Juky San | 4 |

=== 2026 ===
| No. | Week ending date | Title | Artist(s) | Wks. |
|---|---|---|---|---|
| 12 | 1 January | "Dạo này" | Obito | 2 |
| 13 | 15 January | "Ai ngoài anh" | VSTRA and Tyronee | 4 |
| 14 | 12 February | "Vạn sự như ý" | Trúc Nhân | 2 |
| re | 26 February | "Ai ngoài anh" | VSTRA and Tyronee | 1 |
| 15 | 5 March | "Go" | Blackpink | 1 |
| re | 12 March | "Ai ngoài anh" | VSTRA and Tyronee | 1 |
| 16 | 19 March | "Người im lặng gặp người hay nói" | Hieuthuhai | 1 |
| 17 | 26 March | "Swim" | BTS | 9 |
| 18 | 28 May | "Come My Way" | Sơn Tùng M-TP and Tyga | 3 |
| 19 | 18 June | "Em" | Binz | 1 |
| 19 | 25 June | "Nếu như ta chẳng còn" | RPT MCK feat. A$AP Ướt Mi | 1 |
| 20 | 2 July | "Tìm em" | Hngle feat. Bảo Anh | 2 |
| 21 | 16 July | "Xương rồng" | Dangrangto and Donal | 5 |
| 22 | 20 August | "Thiên đường với người thương" | Phương Mỹ Chi | 3 |
| re | 10 September | "Xương rồng" | Dangrangto and Donal | 5 |
| 23 | 15 October | "Chờ chút..." | CongB | 3 |
| 24 | 5 November | "Như một người rưng" | Osad and Hà An Huy | 2 |

== See also ==
- Billboard Vietnam Hot 100
