= Hòa Minzy =

Vietnamese singer and actress (born 1995)

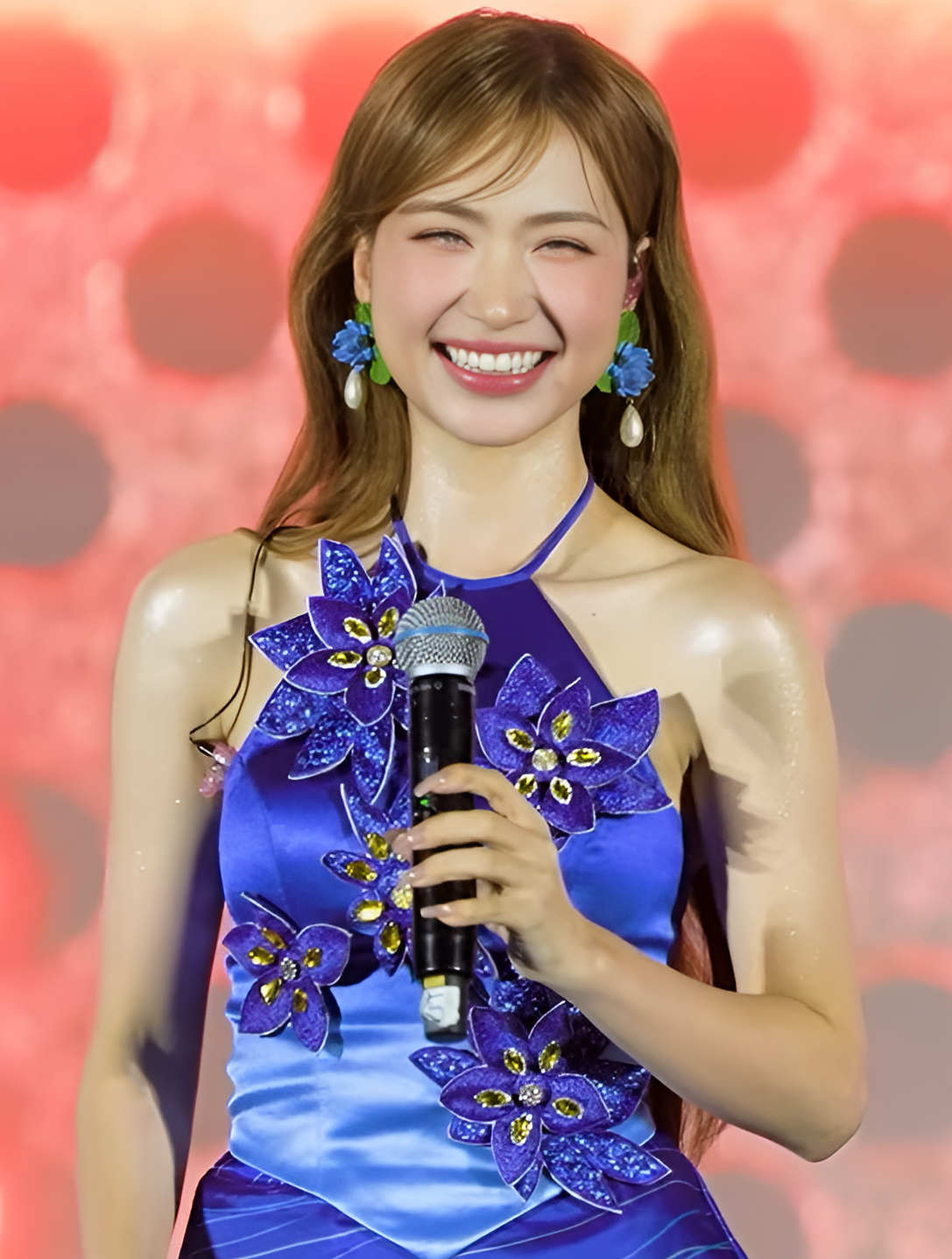
- Hòa Minzy in 2025

Background information
- Born: Nguyễn Thị Hòa; 31 May 1995 (age 31); Quế Võ, Bắc Ninh, Vietnam
- Genres: Pop; ballad; electronic; bolero
- Occupations: Singer; actress; MC
- Instrument: Vocals
- Years active: 2014–present
- Labels: Stars Park Entertainment; HMZ Entertainment
- Partner: Nguyễn Minh Hải (2017–2022)

Nguyễn Thị Hòa (born 31 May 1995), known professionally as Hòa Minzy, is a Vietnamese singer and actress. She was the champion of the reality television competition Star Academy Vietnam in its first season.

Hòa Minzy is also a television actress who has appeared on game shows and talk shows.

== Life and career ==
=== Early life ===
Nguyễn Thị Hòa was born in Quế Võ, Bắc Ninh province, Vietnam, on 31 May 1995, the fourth of five children. She had an interest in singing since childhood. Determined to pursue her passion, when she was in her late teens, she asked her parents to go to Hanoi alone so she could earn a living and study music. Some of her earliest jobs included singing in tea rooms and cafes and modeling for teen magazines. She also began to use the stage name Hòa Minzy.

=== 2014: Entering showbiz ===
Joining Star Academy Vietnam in 2014, Hòa Minzy made an impression on the judges and audience with her singing and dancing. On 18 June, she was crowned champion of the season finale, with an audience rating of 51.16%, after three months of competition.

In November, Hòa Minzy released her debut single, "Thư chưa gửi anh". In December, she issued the song "Gửi".

=== 2015: First hits ===
In June 2015, Hòa Minzy recorded the song "Sẽ chiến thắng" to support the Vietnamese team at the 2015 Southeast Asian Games. The following month, she collaborated with Mr. T on the song "Ăn gì đây". The track was featured in the television series Favorite Song in August. Hòa Minzy later recorded a Thai version of the song with comedian and YouTuber Bie the Ska. In September, she released the song "Mưa nhớ", a collaboration with Tiên Cookie.

=== 2016–2017: Directing and acting ===
In April 2016, Hòa Minzy participated in the fourth season of Your Face Sounds Familiar. She won the Most Favorite Contestant, with 31.5% of the votes. She also began hosting several programs on Yeah1TV and YanTV. On 31 May, on her birthday, Hòa Minzy released a short film she had directed as well as the song "Vì anh là của em". In November, she issued the single "Sống không hối tiếc".

In 2017, Hòa Minzy appeared in the horror-comedy film Linh Duyên. To celebrate White Day, she released the song "Tìm một nửa cô đơn" on 14 March. In July, she appeared in the series Glee Vietnam. In October, Hòa Minzy participated in the British television reality singing contest Just the Two of Us. In November, she performed on the MAMA Awards premiere stage in Ho Chi Minh City with Đức Phúc and Erik.

=== 2018–present: singles ===
In January 2018, Hòa Minzy released the single "Thế là Tết", with Đức Phúc. The duo issued another song together in April, titled "Cứ yêu đi". In May, Hòa Minzy released the song "Rời bỏ". The track was named Top Trending Music Video Vietnam on YouTube Rewind that year and won Favorite Pop/Ballad Song at the Zing Music Awards. In July, Hòa Minzy issued the children's song "Nàng tiên cá". In October, she released the song "Chấp nhận".

In January 2019, Hòa Minzy published three new songs—"Để khoảnh khắc mãi đong đầy", "Hết mana", and "Tự tin là chính tôi"—on which she collaborated with various artists, including Đức Phúc, Justatee, Trường Giang, Only C, and Trần Tiểu Vy. She also took on a coaching role on the game show Tuyệt đỉnh song ca nhí. In May, she released the song "Chỉ là tình cờ".

In 2025, Hoa Minzy released the song "Bắc Bling", a collaboration with Xuân Hinh and Tuấn Cry.

== Discography ==
=== Singles ===
==== As lead artist ====
Title	Year	Peak chart positions		Album	Ref
Title	Year	VIE Hot & VIE	VIE Top	Album	Ref
"Thư Chưa Gửi Anh"	2014	–	–	Non-album single	
"Vì Anh Là Của Em"	2016	–	–	Non-album single	
"Sống Không Hối Tiếc"	2016	–	–	Non-album single	
"Tự Nhiên Buồn"	2017	–	–	Non-album single	
"Tìm Một Nửa Cô Đơn"	2017	–	–	Non-album single	
"Rời Bỏ"	2018	–	–	Non-album single	
"Nàng Tiên Cá"	2018	–	–	Non-album single	
"Chấp Nhận"	2018	–	–	Non-album single	
"Chỉ Là Tình Cờ"	2019	–	–	Non-album single	
"Không Thể Cùng Nhau Suốt Kiếp" (feat. Mr. Siro or with Đức Phúc & Erik)	2020	–	–	Non-album single	
"Nếu Mai Này Xa Nhau"	2020	–	–	Non-album single	
"Người Đến Sau Thay Em"	2022	87	62	Non-album single	
"Bật Tình Yêu Lên" (with Tăng Duy Tân)	2023	3	2	Non-album single	
"Thị Mầu"	2023	90	66	Non-album single	
"Kén Cá Chọn Canh"	2024	(Note: Billboard Vietnam was discountinued in January 2024, and The Official Vietnam Chart Top 20 was launched in January 2025.)		Non-album single	
"Bắc Bling (Bắc Ninh)" (feat. Xuân Hinh & Tuấn Cry)	2025	1		Non-album single	

==== As featured artist ====
Title	Year	Album	Ref
"Ăn Gì Đây" (Mr. T feat. Hòa Minzy)	2015	Non-album single	
"Ăn Gì Đây 2" (Mr. T feat. Hòa Minzy)	2016	Non-album single	
"Amazing Thai Food (Ăn Gì Đây, Thai Version)" (Bie the Ska feat. Hòa Minzy)	2017	Non-album single	
"Cứ Yêu Đi" (Đức Phúc feat. Hòa Minzy)	2018	100 Ngày Bên Em OST	
"Bắc Bling" (Tuấn Cry, Xuân Hinh feat. Hòa Minzy)	2025	Non-album single	

=== Promotional singles ===
Title	Year	Album	Ref
"Gửi"	2014	Non-album promotional single	
"Giá Như" / "Quay Về Đi" (feat. Nguyễn Minh Cường)	2015	Non-album promotional single	
"Mưa Nhớ"	2015	Non-album promotional single	
"Hãy Để Con Lo"	2015	Non-album promotional single	
"Ăn Gì Đây 3"	2016	Non-album promotional single	
"Thế là Tết" (with Đức Phúc)	2018	Non-album promotional single	
"Mặt Trời Vẫn Tới Mỗi Ngày" (with Đàm Vĩnh Hưng, Noo Phước Thịnh, Văn Mai Hương, Erik, and Hương Giang)	2018	Non-album promotional single	
"Hey Monta!"	2018	Monta OST	
"Để Khoảnh Khắc Mãi Đong Đầy" (with Đức Phúc)	2019	Non-album promotional single	
"Hết Mana" (with JustaTee, Big Daddy, and Bình Gold)	2019	Non-album promotional single	
"Fit Me – Tự Tin Là Chính Tôi"	2019	Non-album promotional single	
"Điều Buồn Nhất Khi Yêu"	2019	Non-album promotional single	
"Tết Nhà Mình" (with Lăng LD)	2021	Non-album promotional single	
"Tết Xa Hoá Gần" (with Mew Amazing)	2021	Non-album promotional single	
"Chắc Khỏe Có Đôi (We Belong Together)"	2022	Non-album promotional single	
"Có Xứng Đáng Hay Không" (with Trịnh Thăng Bình)	2022	Non-album promotional single	
"Khác Biệt To Lớn" (with Trịnh Thăng Bình)	2022	Non-album promotional single	
"Người Ấy" (with Trịnh Thăng Bình)	2022	Non-album promotional single	
"Tết Bùng Nội Lực" (with Bùi Công Nam)	2023	Non-album promotional single	
"Em Sẽ Quên" (Vietnamese version of "If" by Taeyeon)	2023	Biển Của Hy Vọng (Sea of Hope Vietnam), episode 13	

== Selected filmography ==
=== Television ===
Year	Title	Role	Note/Ref.
2014	Star Academy Vietnam	Contestant	
2014	Bài hát Việt	Guest	"Tan vào đêm"
2014	Những bài hát còn xanh	Contestant	
2014, 2015	Bài hát yêu thích	Guest	
2015	Don't forget the Lyrics!	Guest	
2015	Ghế không tựa	Guest	
2016	Your Face Sounds Familiar	Contestant	
2016	Bếp chiến	Guest, MC	
2017	Glee Vietnam	Linh San	
2017	Just the Two of Us	Contestant	
2017, 2018	Cầu thủ nhí	Nanny	
2018	Giọng ải giọng ai	Guest	
2018	Lâu lâu líu lo show	Host	12 episodes
2018	Thank God You're Here Vietnam	Guest	

=== Short film ===
Year	Title	Role	Ref
2016	Vì anh là của em	Herself	

=== Film ===
Year	Title	Role	Ref
2017	Linh duyên	Hạnh	

== Awards and nominations ==
Year	Award	Category	Recipient	Result	Note	Ref
2010	The Voice of Bắc Ninh Province	Final	Hòa Minzy	Silver medal	2 consecutive years	
2011	The Voice of Bắc Ninh Province	Final	Hòa Minzy	Silver medal	2 consecutive years	
2014	Star Academy Vietnam	Final	Hòa Minzy	Champion	Vote rate: 51.16%	
2016	Your Face Sounds Familiar Vietnam	Favorite Contestant	Hòa Minzy	Won	Vote rate: 31.5%	
2017	Green Wave Awards	Prospective Female Artist	Hòa Minzy	Won		
2017	Just the Two of Us Vietnam	Final	Hòa Minzy	Runner-up	With Erik Đức Phúc	
2017	Zing Music Awards	Favorite Female Artist	Hòa Minzy	Nominated	Top 5	
2018	Zing Music Awards	Artist of the year	Hòa Minzy	Nominated	Top 5	
2018	Zing Music Awards	Favorite Dance/Electronic Song	"Nàng tiên cá"	Nominated	Top 5	
2018	Zing Music Awards	Favorite Pop/Ballad Song	"Rời bỏ"	Won		
2018	Zing Music Awards	Favorite Female Artist	Hòa Minzy	Won		
2018	Mai Vàng Prize	Mai Vàng Music Video Prize	"Mặt trời vẫn tới mỗi ngày"	Nominated	Various artists	
2018	Mai Vàng Prize	Mai Vàng Song Prize	"Mặt trời vẫn tới mỗi ngày"	Nominated	Various artists	
