= Xuân Hinh =

Vietnamese actor, comedian, and vocalist (born 1960)

- Born: Bùi Xuân Hinh; 8 April 1960 (age 66); Bắc Ninh, North Vietnam
- Occupations: Actor; comedian; vocalist
- Years active: 1977–present
- Spouse: Nguyễn Phương Lan

Xuân Hinh (born 8 April 1960) is a Vietnamese actor, comedian, and chèo vocalist. In 1977, while still in high school, Xuân was admitted to the Bac Ninh Quan Ho Folk song troupe. Six years later, in 1983, he developed an interest in the chèo form of musical theatre. He subsequently applied and was admitted to the Hanoi University of Theater and Cinema. After graduating, he remained at the university as a lecturer, though he resigned after a year and transferred to the Cheo Theater in Hanoi.

== Personal life ==
In 1995, Xuân's wife gave birth to their first child, a daughter. He also has a son.
