= Abracadabra (disambiguation) =

Abracadabra is an incantation used by stage magicians, and formerly in Gnosticism and ancient Roman medicine.

Abracadabra, abra cadabra or abra kadabra may also refer to:

== Music ==
=== Performers ===
- Abra Cadabra, stage name of British rapper Aaron Philips (born 1997)
- Abracadabra (band), American indie pop band founded in 2019

=== Albums ===
- Abracadabra (ABC album), 1991
- Abracadabra (Buck-Tick album), 2020
- Abracadabra (Claire Hamill album), 1975
- Abracadabra (Florent Pagny album), 2006
- Abracadabra (Steve Miller Band album), 1982

=== Songs ===
- "Abracadabra" (Brown Eyed Girls song), 2009
- "Abracadabra" (Lady Gaga song), 2025
- "Abracadabra" (Steve Miller Band song), 1982
- "Abra-ca-dabra", a 1973 single by The DeFranco Family
- "Abracadabra", a 2000 song by Alizée from Gourmandises
- "Abracadabra", a 2001 song by Azúcar Moreno from Amén
- "Abracadabra", a 2010 song by Booba from Lunatic
- "Abracadabra", a 1999 song by Caramell from Gott Och Blandat
- "Abracadabra", a 1978 song by Clifford Jordan from Inward Fire
- "Abracadabra", a 2004 song by Cindy Blackman from Music for the New Millennium
- "Abracadabra", a 1993 song by Eliana from Os Dedinhos
- "Abracadabra", a 1998 song by Elvis Crespo from Suavemente
- "Abracadabra", a 2017 song by Emancipator from Baralku
- "Abracadabra", a 2005 song by From Bubblegum to Sky from Dimension Mix
- "Abracadabra", a 2014 song by He Is Legend from Heavy Fruit
- "Abracadabra", a 2013 song by Heavatar from All My Kingdoms
- "Abracadabra", a 2011 song by Jessie J from Who You Are
- "Abracadabra", a 2013 song by Jipsta from Turnt Up
- "Abracadabra", a 1971 song by Judee Sill from Judee Sill
- "Abracadabra", a 1996 song by Kerber from Zapis
- "Abracadabra", a 1998 song by the Legendary Pink Dots from Nemesis Online
- "Abracadabra", a 2018 song by Lil Wayne from Dedication 6: Reloaded
- "Abracadabra", a 1980 song by M from The Official Secrets Act
- "Abracadabra", a 2014 song by Mägo de Oz from Ilussia
- "Abracadabra", a 2006 song by Mallavoodoo from Soma
- "Abracadabra", a 2023 song by Nas from Magic 2
- "Abracadabra", a 2010 song by Nox Arcana from Theater of Illusion
- "Abracadabra", a 2008 song by OHM from Circus of Sound
- "Abracadabra", a 2014 song by Ringo Sheena from Hi Izuru Tokoro
- "Abracadabra", a 2000 song by S.O.A.P. from Miracle
- "Abracadabra", a 2006 song by Suga Free from The Features, Vol. 1
- "Abracadabra", a 2020 song by YooA from Bon Voyage
- "Abracadabra", a 2023 song by Young Thug from Business Is Business
- "Abracadabra (Have You Seen Her?)", a 1973 song by Blue Ash from No More, No Less
- "Abrakadabra", a 2013 song by Saltatio Mortis from Das Schwarze Einmaleins
- "Aberakadabera", a 1981 song by Erste Allgemeine Verunsicherung from Café Passé

== Film ==
- Abracadabra (1952 film), an Italian film
- Abracadabra (2017 film), a Spanish-French film
- Abracadabra (2019 film), an Indonesian-Singaporean film
- Abra Cadabra (film), a 1983 Australian animated feature

== Other uses ==
- Abracadabra! (video game), 1983
- Abracadabra (video game), 1988
- Abra Kadabra (character), a DC Comics supervillain
- Agra cadabra, a species of beetle
- Goodliffe's Abracadabra, a weekly magic magazine that closed in 2009
- Theora mesopotamica, a species of bivalve mollusc, a synonym of which is Abra cadabra
- Abra, Kadabra, and Alakazam, characters in the Pokémon video game franchise
- "Abra Kadabra" (The Flash episode), an episode of The Flash
- Abra Kadabra (Arrowverse), a character appearing on the Arrowverse

== See also ==
- Abrakebabra, an Irish restaurant
- Abrahadabra, a magical formula in Thelema
- Avada kedavra, the "Killing Curse" in the Harry Potter novel series
- Cadabra (disambiguation)
- "Houdini" (Eminem song), chorus line "abra cadabra," interpolating the Steve Miller Band song
