= Noise Viola (album) =

Studio album by Noise Viola
- Released: 2007
- Genre: Instrumental music, Classical music, Brazilian rhythms
- Length: 44:10
- Producer: Paulo Barros, Fred Andrade, Carlinhos Borges

Noise Viola is the debut album by Brazilian instrumental music band Noise Viola. Produced by two members of the group (Paulo Barros and Fred Andrade) and Carlinhos Borges, the album was financed by Funcultura. It was released in 2007 and positively criticized around the country.

The releasing show of the album happened in Santa Isabel Theater, Recife, on July 14.

== Track listing ==
#	Title	Songwriters	Length
1.	"Primeira pá de cal"	Fred Andrade	0:41
2.	"Maracatu bonito"	Fred Andrade	6:42
3.	"Violado"	Breno Lira	2:47
4.	"São Jorge só tem um"	Paulo Barros	3:34
5.	"Nino, o pernambuquinho"	Maestro Duda	3:46
6.	"Música feia"	Fred Andrade	3:53
7.	"Baião de dois"	Breno Lira	2:58
8.	"Espelho cego"	Paulo Barros	5:55
9.	"Lídio macacão"	Edson Rodrigues	2:18
10.	"Vou sonhar mais um pouquinho que é pra dar tempo de você ver"	Fred Andrade	3:30
11.	"Maracatu em cinco"	Breno Lira, Tomás Melo	4:47
12.	"Baião pro Noise"	Roberto Silva	3:14

== Personnel ==
- Breno Lira: viola, acoustic guitar (in "Maracatu em cinco")
- Tomás Melo: percussion
- Fred Andrade: electric guitar, acoustic guitar (in "Primeira pá de cal", "Maracatu bonito" and "Vou sonhar mais um pouquinho que é pra dar tempo de você ver"), vocals (in "Vou sonhar mais um pouquinho que é pra dar tempo de você ver")
- Paulo Barros: acoustic guitar (all tracks except "Primeira pá de cal", "Lídio macacão", "Vou sonhar mais um pouquinho que é pra dar tempo de você ver" and "Maracatu em cinco")

Special guests:

- Bozó: seven strings guitar (in "Lídio macacão")
- Carlinhos Borges: keyboards (in "São Jorge só tem um")
- Cláudio Negrão: acoustic bass (in "Nino, o pernambuquinho" and "Vou sonhar mais um pouquinho que é pra dar tempo de você ver")
- Ebel Perrelli: drums (in "Vou sonhar mais um pouquinho que é pra dar tempo de você ver")
- Edilson Staudinger: piano (in "Maracatu em cinco")
- Homero Basílio: congas (in "Violado") and derbak, wood blocks and egg shaker (in "Espelho cego")
- Marcinho Eiras: electric guitar (in "Música feia")
- Passarinho Gomes: tambourine (in "Nino, o pernambuquinho" and "Lídio macacão")
