= Supergott =

2001 studio album by Caramell

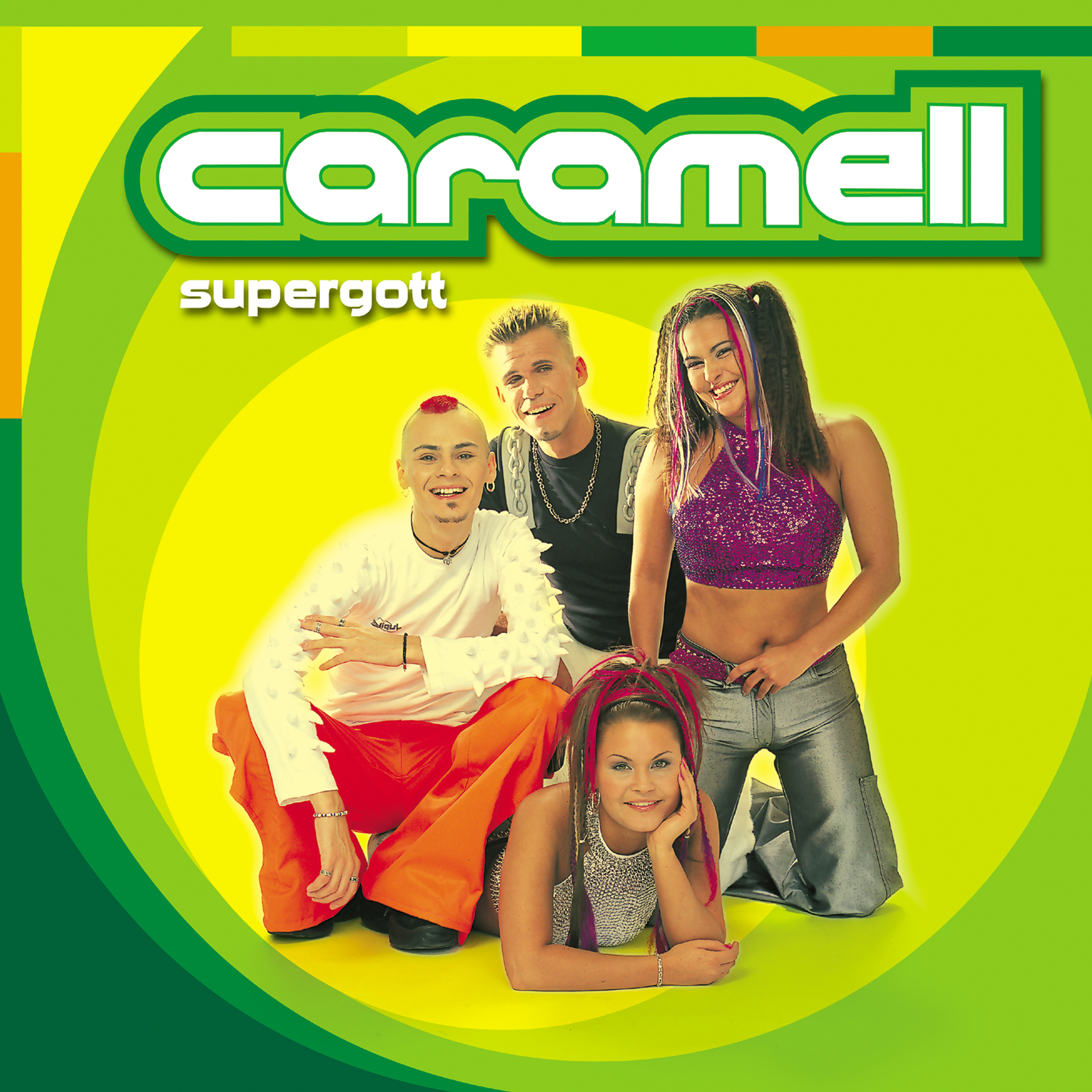

Studio album by Caramell
- Released: 16 November 2001
- Recorded: December 2000 – May 2001
- Studios: Playhouse Studios (Stockholm, Sweden)
- Genres: Bubblegum pop; Eurodance
- Length: 46:34
- Language: Swedish
- Label: Remixed
- Producers: Vasco & Millboy; Adam Edelmann; Theodor Zakaria; Daniel Bäckström; Hans Schumacher

Caramell chronology
Gott Och Blandat (1999)	Supergott (2001)	Supergott Speedy Mixes (2008)

Singles from Supergott
- 1. "Vad Heter Du" Released: 29 June 2001; 2. "Ooa Hela Natten" Released: 22 February 2002

Supergott (Super delicious) is the second and final studio album by Swedish music group Caramell released on 16 November 2001, by Remixed Records. It is famous for the opening song "Caramelldansen". After the album was released, a standalone charity single "Allra Bästa Vänner" was released on 19 April 2002. The group disbanded shortly after.

== 2016 reissue ==
On 3 December 2016, the album was reissued for digital download via Tunecore and YouTube Music.

On 10 March 2020, the album was removed from all digital retailers and streaming services but was put back on all digital retailers and streaming services on 1 April 2020.

== Singles ==
"Caramelldansen"
The chorus to "Caramelldansen".

"Vad Heter Du" was released on 29 June 2001 as the lead single from the album.

"Ooa Hela Natten" was released as the second and final single from the album on 22 February 2002.

== Track listing ==
All tracks written by Jorge Vasconcelo/Juha Myllylä and produced by Vasco & Millboy, except where noted.

No.	Title	Writer(s)	Producer(s)	Length
1.	"Caramelldansen" (The Candy Dance)			3:30
2.	"Vad Heter Du?" (What's Your Name?)			3:14
3.	"Ooa Hela Natten" (Singing All Night; Attack cover)	Lars-Åke Eriksson; Björn Uhr		3:41
4.	"Doktorn" (Doctor)			3:10
5.	"I Min Mobil" (In My Phone)	Vasconcelo; Myllylä; Dan Attlerud		4:01
6.	"Spelar Ingen Roll" (It Doesn't Matter)			3:35
7.	"Diskotek" (Discotheque)			3:38
8.	"I Drömmarnas Land" (In Dreamland)	Adam Edelmann; Theodor Zakaria	Vasco & Millboy; Edelmann; Zakaria	3:12
9.	"Kom Håll Om Mig" (Come On Hold Me)			3:46
10.	"Här E Jag" (Here I Am)	Daniel Bäckström; Hans Schumacher; C. Lindh; S. Enberg	Bäckström; Schumacher	3:22
11.	"Ett & Två" (One and Two)	Vasconcelo; Myllylä; Attlerud		3:23
12.	"Vild Och Galen" (Wild and Crazy)	Vasconcelo; Myllylä; Attlerud		3:19
13.	"Caramell Megamix" (Intro/Caramelldansen/I Min Mobil/Vad Heter Du?/Doktorn/Ooa Hela Natten)		Mixed by DeeJay Ken	4:43
Total length:				46:34

== Charts ==
Chart performance for Supergott
Chart (2002)	Peak position
Swedish Albums (Sverigetopplistan)	51

== Supergott Speedy Mixes ==
Supergott Speedy Mixes

Remix album by Caramell (Note: Later reissues are credited to Caramella Girls.)
- Released: 1 May 2008 (Note: Spotify gives the album's release date as January 5, 2008.)
- Genre: Nightcore
- Length: 37:51
- Language: Swedish
- Label: Remixed

Caramell chronology
Supergott (2001)	Supergott Speedy Mixes (2008)

Caramella Girls chronology
Supergott (Speedy Mixes) (2019)	Sweet Decade (2020)

Alternative cover
- Japanese cover

Singles from Supergott Speedy Mixes
- 1. "Caramelldansen (Speedy Mix)" Released: 1 July 2008

On 1 May 2008, Remixed Records released the sped-up version of the original Supergott album on Apple's iTunes Store. The album was called Supergott Speedy Mixes. In Japan, this was titled U-u-uma-uma SPEED with the song titles completely rewritten with emoticons. Speed reached number 48 on Oricon and stayed 5 weeks.

=== Track listing ===
Track information adapted from Spotify:

1. "Caramelldansen" – 2:55
2. "Vad Heter Du?" – 2:43
3. "Ooa Hela Natten" – 3:05
4. "Doktorn" – 2:39
5. "I Min Mobil" – 3:23
6. "Spelar Ingen Roll" – 3:01
7. "Diskotek" – 3:04
8. "I Drömmarnas Land" – 2:41
9. "Kom Håll Om Mig" – 3:11
10. "Allra Bästa Vänner"– 2:34
11. "Ett & Två" – 2:51
12. "Vild Och Galen" – 2:46
13. "Megamix" – 3:58

=== Charts ===
Chart performance for Supergott Speedy Mixes
Chart (2008)	Peak position
Japanese Albums (Oricon)	48
