= Alakazam =

Alakazam is a magic word or incantation along the lines of abracadabra.

Alakazam or Allakazam may also refer to:

- Alakazam (Pokémon), a fictional species in the Pokémon franchise
- Alakazam the Great, a 1960 Japanese anime film
- "Alakazam !", a 2016 song by Justice
- The Magic Land of Allakazam, an American television series

== See also ==
- Abracadabra (disambiguation)
