= Mandinga =

Mandinga may refer to:

- Mandinka people, an ethnic group in West Africa
- Mandinga (band), a Romanian pop group
- Mandinga (album), a Brazilian album by Projeto Mandinga
- Mandinga (film), a 1978 Italian exploitation film inspired by Mandingo
- Mandinga River (river), a river in Panama
- Pedro Mandinga, a Cimarron leader
- Mandinga in capoeira
