= Factory (band) =

1970s–90s Swedish band

- Origin: Stockholm, Sweden
- Years active: 1978–1982
- Past members: Mats Carinder, Ted Leinsköld, Lars-Olof Larsson, Ken Siewertson, Mats Söderberg

Factory was a band from Stockholm in Sweden, active between 1978 and 1982, scoring chart successes in Sweden during the late 1970s and 1980s.

Factory broke through in Sweden with the 1978 single Efter plugget. The single was followed up by the album Factory. The band toured the Nordic Region in the late 1970s and early 1980s and also released the 1980 album Factory II.

After Factory broke up, bassist Siewertson joined the Swedish hair metal band Treat and played on their early albums before leaving in 1989.

During the 1990s, the band was reunited temporary touring with, among others, Magnum Bonum, Attack and Snowstorm.

== Members ==
- Mats Carinder, vocals
- Ted Leinsköld, guitar
- Lars-Olof Larsson, keyboard
- Ken Siewertson, bass
- Mats Söderberg, drums

== Discography ==
=== Studio albums ===
- Factory (1979)
- Factory II (1980)

=== Compilation albums ===
- Best of Factory (1989)

=== Singles ===
- Lumpna funderingar (1978)
- Efter plugget (1978)
- Kuddsnack (1979)
- Face to Face (1981)
- Jag ställer inte upp (1981)
- Hårt mot hårt (1982)
- Ooa hela natten (with Attack och Magnum Bonum) (1992)

=== Maxisingles 12" ===
- Efter plugget (1989)
