= Fred Andrade =

Brazilian musician and composer

- Genres: Rock, jazz, Brazilian music, Baião
- Occupations: Musician, composer
- Instruments: Guitar, acoustic guitar, Viola caipira
- Years active: 1980s–present
- Website: fredandrade.com

Fred Andrade is a Brazilian musician and composer. Active in Recife, Pernambuco, Brazil, he has played with Elba Ramalho, Quinteto Violado, Heraldo do Monte, Naná Vasconcelos, Lula Queiroga, Dominguinhos, and Lenine. He was also member of the instrumental groups Mandinga and Noise Viola.

== Biography ==
Fred Andrade composed the soundtrack for Festival de Cinema Nacional.

In 2000, he recorded his debut album, named Ilusões a granel. In 1995, he joined the group Anynote Jazz Quartet, with Sidor Hulak (guitar), Hélio Silva (bass) and Ebel Perrelli (drums), which attracted many music students during its shows. In 2002, also with Perrelli, he started a musical project with the objective of mix rock and Brazilian rhythms. It was called Projeto Mandinga and lasted some years. During this period, Perrelli and Andrade did many shows in Brazil and recorded an album. This work was very acclaimed by people and experts.

In 2003, Andrade joined Paulo Barros for creating the instrumental band Noise Viola, which mixes classical music and popular rhythms from Pernambuco. In this band, he made several shows and recorded one album, which received the name of the group and were very acclaimed by music critics. Parallel to this work, Andrade continued his solo career and recorded other three albums: Guitarra de rua (2005), Farra de anjo (2006) and Pele da alma (2009).

Andrade also organized many festivals around Brazil. In 2006, with Celso Pixinga, he organized Guitar Player Festival, in Recife. The event was positively criticized and counted with the participation of the best Brazilian guitar players.

Along his career, he also played and recorded with many other artists and bands, such as Treminhão and Sa Grama. Actually, Andrade is still member of Noise Viola. He also teaches in Conservatório Pernambucano de Música and Centro de Educação Musical de Olinda and realizes many show and workshops around Brazil.

== Discography ==
=== As leader ===
- 2000: Ilusões a granel
- 2005: Guitarra de rua
- 2006: Farra de anjo
- 2009: Pele da alma
- 2011: Umbral
- 2015: Sacrifício Pela Fé
- 2017: Infinito
- 2021: Distantes

=== With Mandinga ===
- 2002: Mandinga
- 2012: DVD Mandinga

=== With Noise Viola ===
- 2007:(album) Noise viola
- 2015:(album) A canção do mar do silêncio

=== With Membrana Instrumental ===
- 2019: Um Dia
