= Kadabra (disambiguation) =

Kadabra is a Pokémon species based on a dog.

Kadabra or Cadabra may also refer to:

- Cadabra (disambiguation)
- Kadabra or Abra Kadabra (character), a DC Comics supervillain sometimes referred to as simply "Kadabra"

== See also ==
- Abracadabra (disambiguation)
