= Zirkus Zeitgeist =

Studio album by Saltatio Mortis
- Released: 2015
- Genre: Folk punk, punk rock, folk rock
- Length: 55:22
- Label: WE LOVE MUSIC

Saltatio Mortis chronology
Das Schwarze Einmaleins (2013)	Zirkus Zeitgeist (2015)	Brot und Spiele (2018)

Zirkus Zeitgeist is the tenth studio album by German medieval metal group Saltatio Mortis.

== Track listing ==
No.	Title	Writer(s)	Translation	Length
1.	"Wo sind die Clowns?"	Lasterbalk (lyrics); Luzi & Alea (music)	Where are the clowns?	3:25
2.	"Willkommen in der Weihnachtszeit"	Lasterbalk; Jean	Welcome to Christmas time	2:46
3.	"Nachts weinen die Soldaten"	Lasterbalk; Luzi & Alea	The soldiers cry at night	4:40
4.	"Des Bänkers neue Kleider"	Lasterbalk; Alea, Luzi & Jean	The banker's new clothes	4:02
5.	"Maria"	Lasterbalk & Trad.; Alea & Trad.		3:19
6.	"Wir sind Papst"	Lasterbalk; Jean, Luzi & Lasterbalk	We are pope	3:17
7.	"Augen zu"	Lasterbalk; Jean	Eyes closed	4:51
8.	"Geradeaus"	Lasterbalk; Luzi & Alea	Straight ahead	4:22
9.	"Erinnerung"	Jean, Alea & Lasterbalk; Jean, Alea & Luzi	Memory	4:22
10.	"Trinklied"	Lasterbalk; Jean & Alea	Drinking song	3:34
11.	"Rattenfänger"	Lasterbalk; Jean	Pied Piper	3:26
12.	"Todesengel"	Lasterbalk; Jean, Till & Luzi	Angel of death	3:56
13.	"Vermessung des Glücks"	Lasterbalk; Luzi, Jean, Till & Alea	Measurement of Happiness	4:12
14.	"Abschiedsmelodie"	Lasterbalk; Jean & Alea	Farewell melody	3:50
Total length:				51:22

== Charts ==
=== Weekly charts ===
Chart (2015)	Peak position
Austrian Albums (Ö3 Austria)	9
German Albums (Offizielle Top 100)	1
Swiss Albums (Schweizer Hitparade)	13

=== Year-end charts ===
Chart (2015)	Position
German Albums (Offizielle Top 100)	63
