= Caramell =

Swedish musical group

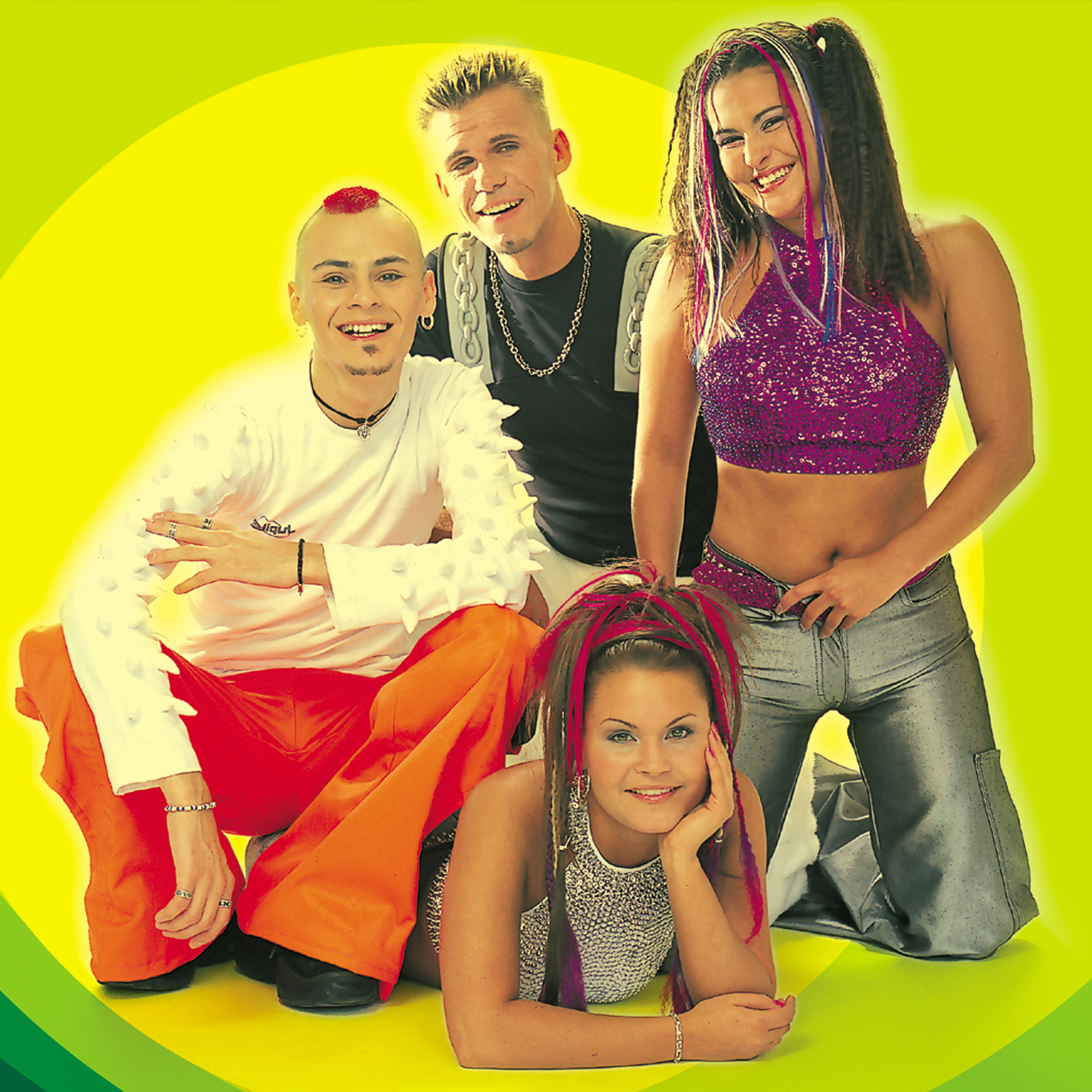
- Caramell in 2001; back row, L–R: Vasconcelo, Myllylä, Löfgren; front row: Sundström

Background information
- Origin: Funäsdalen, Sweden
- Years active: 1998–2002; 2018; 2020
- Labels: WEA; Remixed
- Spinoffs: Vasco & Millboy; Caramella Girls
- Past members: Jorge Vasconcelo; Juha Myllylä; Katia Löfgren; Malin Sundström

Caramell was a Swedish music group active between 1998 and 2002, formed by singers Katia Löfgren and Malin Sundström, and producers Jorge "Vasco" Vasconcelo and Juha "Millboy" Myllylä. They are best known for their 2001 song "Caramelldansen". The group released two albums, Gott och blandat (1999) and Supergott (2001).

Some time after Caramell had their hiatus, Jorge and Juha formed a duo as Vasco & Millboy, but the two split soon after. Sundström also went on to start a solo career as Dinah Nah. The group released Supergott Speedy Mixes in 2008, later retroactively re-credited to the virtual group Caramella Girls. The group reunited for the Vi som älskar 90-talet concert in Stockholm in 2018.

== Discography ==
=== Studio albums ===
- Gott och blandat (10 September 1999) – No. 23 Sweden
- Supergott (16 November 2001) – No. 51 Sweden

=== Remix albums ===
- Supergott Speedy Mixes (known as U-u-uma-uma SPEED in Japan) (2008) – No. 48 on Oricon

=== Singles ===
Title	Year	Peak chart positions		Album
Title	Year	SWE	JPN	Album
"Om du var min"	1999	7	–	Gott och blandat
"Efter plugget"	1999	18	–	Gott och blandat
"Jag ser på dig"	1999	43	–	Gott och blandat
"Explodera (Upp som dynamit)"	1999	37	–	Gott och blandat
"Vad heter du?"	2001	21	–	Supergott
"Ooa hela natten"	2001	–	–	Supergott
"Allra bästa vänner"	2002	–	–	Non-album single
"Caramelldansen" (Speedycake Remix) (known as "U-u-uma uma" (Speedycake Remix) in Japan)	2008	–	16	Supergott Speedy Mixes
"Vad heter du?" (with QUB3)	2020	–	–	Non-album single
