= Mallavoodoo =

- Origin: Recife, Pernambuco, Brazil
- Genres: Rock, jazz
- Years active: 1996–present
- Members: Thales Silveira; Mário Lobo; Alexandre Bicudo; Misael Barros
- Past members: Ebel Perrelli
- Website: http://www.mallavoodoo.com.br/

Mallavoodoo is a Brazilian instrumental music group formed by Thales Silveira (bass), Alexandre Bicudo (guitar), Mário Lobo (keyboards and saxophone) and Misael Barros (drums).

== History ==
In 1983 in the United States Silveira and Lobo met as students at Boston's Berklee College of Music. They returned to Recife in 1987 to perform in the city's nightclubs and play with various local musicians. In 1992, Bicudo joined the group. The trio's first name was Palladium. Later, the trio was renamed Tusch.

The band was founded as Mallavoodoo in 1996 in Recife, Pernambuco, when Perrelli joined the trio. The band's influences included rock and roll, progressive rock, jazz and blues, and its songs combined classical and electric instruments.

Initially, João Maurício served as vocalist. However, he left the group after a short time. Mallavoodoo, now a quintet, began playing at a Recife nightclub, Santório Geral.

However, the group preferred playing instrumental music and gradually included their own songs in their repertoire. Mallavoodoo's four instrumentalists (Silveira, Bicudo, Lobo and Perrelli) stayed together for ten years, and recorded the band's first album, O inverno e a garça, which was released in 2001. The production of this album, which cost 28,000 reais, was financed by Jayme da Fonte Hospital and Recife City Hall. A show was held to celebrate the release in Shopping Sítio da Trindade, Recife, in 2001.

In 2006, Perrelli was replaced by Barros, another very experienced musician. The group's new lineup recorded its second album in the same year, Soma. Both albums were produced by Thales Silveira and financed by Recife City Hall.

Since its inception, the band has played in many festivals around Brazil and especially Pernambuco. Among all the events which the group performed in, the most traditional were: Recife Jazz Festival and Festival de Inverno de Garanhuns.

In both albums, Mallavoodoo sought new directions for contemporary instrumental music. Their members usually play instrumental covers of the songs of bands such as the Beatles and Deep Purple, with no vocals. Mallavoodoo is considered one of the main instrumental music groups in Brazil's Pernambuco state.

== Discography ==
- 2001: O inverno e a garça
- 2006: Soma
