= Caramelldansen =

Song and internet meme

- Cover art of the remix

Song by Caramell

from the album Supergott
- Language: Swedish
- Released: 16 November 2001
- Studio: Playhouse Studios (Stockholm, Sweden)
- Genre: Dance-pop; Eurodance
- Length: 3:30
- Label: Remixed
- Songwriters: Jorge Vasconcelo; Juha Myllylä
- Producers: Vasco & Millboy

Audio video
- "Caramelldansen" on YouTube

Audio sample
- Chorus of the song: file; help

"Caramelldansen" (Swedish for 'The Candy (Note: Karamell in Swedish can refer to any candy, especially hard candy.) Dance') is the first track from Swedish music group Caramell's second and final album Supergott released in 2001. It became an Internet meme in the mid-2000s after a sped-up version of the song was attached to a video loop from the Japanese visual novel Popotan, which went viral. This version of the song was officially released in 2006 in Sweden and Japan as "U-u-uma uma" (ウッーウッーウマウマ(゜∀゜)), the latter of which charted on Oricon. A virtual group called Caramella Girls was launched to promote the song, renditions in other languages, and other cover songs and original songs.

== Internet phenomenon ==
Animation loop from the visual novel Popotan, used in the internet meme known as "Caramelldansen"

The meme started as a fifteen frame Flash animation loop showing Mai and Mii, characters of the Japanese visual novel Popotan, doing a hip swing dance with their hands over their heads to imitate rabbit ears, and the chorus of a sped up version of the song.

=== Background ===
Popotan first appeared as a Japanese PC game on 12 December 2002. After the anime was aired from 17 July to 2 October 2003, short GIF animations clips were created from the opening of the game and posted on the internet. The clips were matched with various songs, with titles ranging from "Popotan dance" to "Sexy bunny dance".

In late 2005, a sped-up version of the song was posted by a DJ named Speedycake to 4chan. According to an interview with Ruakuu, Speedycake said the speed-up came from a mixing mistake while transitioning the "Caramelldansen" song to a faster BPM, and it ended up being "squeaky and high pitched", but that people were requesting for it anyway. In the same year, its chorus part was combined with the animation loop and posted to 4chan by a "Sven from Sweden".

As the video and song clip gained popularity, it became a meme. Artists and fans started to copy the animation and include other characters performing the dance. Its boom began at the end of 2007 in Japan (known as the "Uma uma Boom") where an explosion of different Caramelldansen iterations appeared in the Japanese video-sharing site Nico Nico Douga. The meme soon after spread to YouTube and became a global phenomenon. Lore Sjöberg wrote in a Wired magazine article about how Flickr users "look down from Flickr Hills into YouTube Chasm and see wailing, gnashing of teeth, and endless versions of "Caramelldansen" and they are sore afraid."

=== Popularity ===
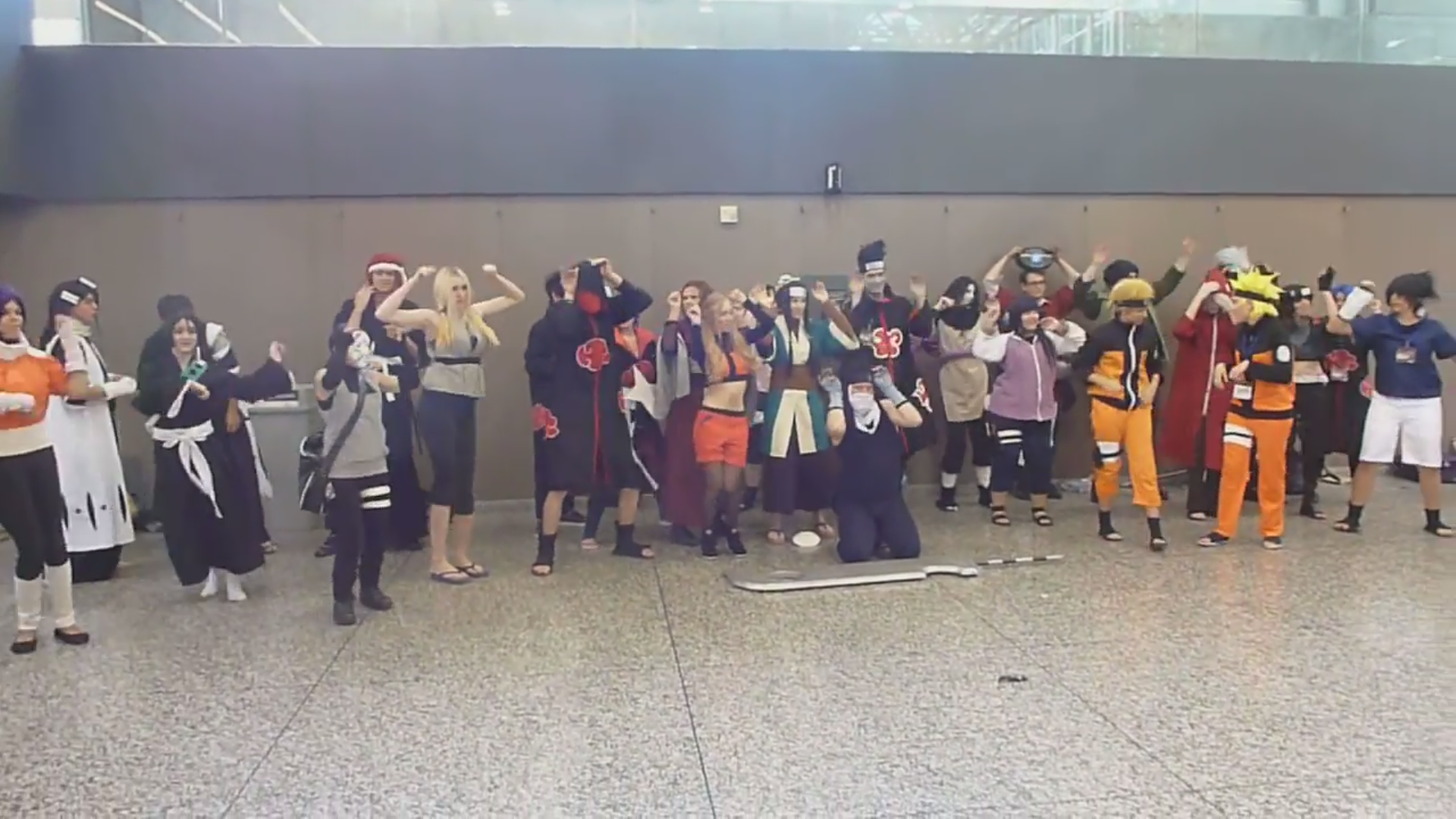
Naruto cosplayers performing Caramelldansen at Otakuthon, 2013.

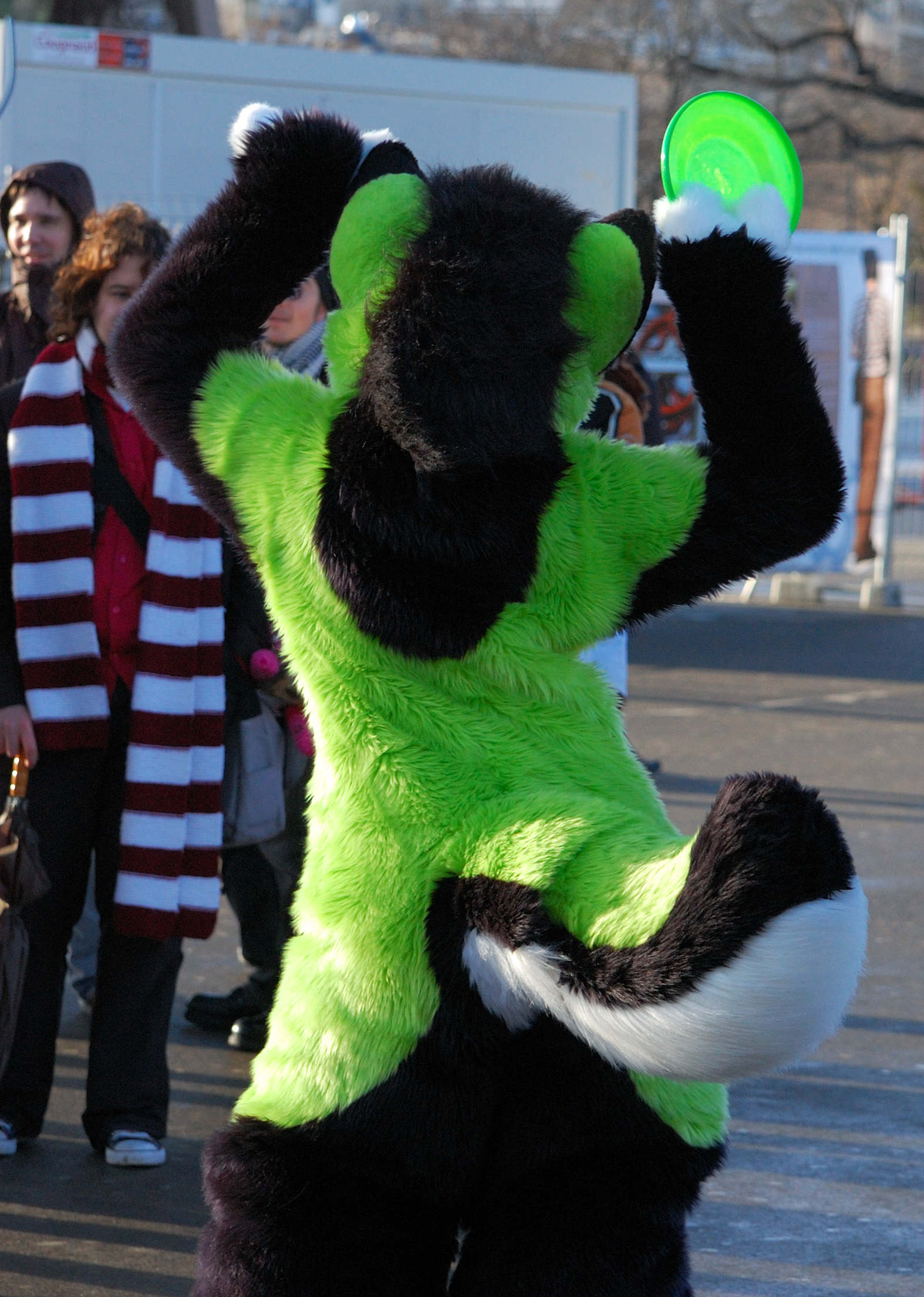
A furry performs Caramelldansen, 2009.

While the group Caramell had disbanded in 2002, the group's music started to spread widely across the Internet thanks to the popularity of this Internet meme. Malin Sundström commented on the popularity of the meme: "We felt that it was time to move on; that one of our songs now may be a breakthrough is just a bonus." Caramell's Juha "Millboy" Myllylä, responding to questions from Japanese show Netstar NHK, said that he first learned of the dance on YouTube. When asked if he does the dance himself, he responded, "Yeah, well, the dance is very funny to do, so I used to do it every time, I mean in the shower, and I used to show my family and my friends to make them dance. I like it. It's very funny."

The meme is not limited to the small Flash animation loops. 3D animation shorts have been released performing the dance, and live action videos made by fans. The idea of the new Swedish concept came from YouTube, showing more than 16,000 different versions of the original Flash animation, including small loops, complete song shorts and live action videos.

Caramelldansen is known in Japan as "Uma uma dance" (ウマウマダンス), because the chorus's lyrics "u-u-ua-ua" were misheard as ウッーウッーウマウマ ("u- u- umauma") The Japanese title is written with the kaomoji (°∀°) added to the end. The lyric: "Dansa med oss, klappa era händer" ("Dance with us, clap your hands") was sometimes misinterpreted as "バルサミコ酢やっぱいらへんで" ("barusamiko-su yappa irahen de"), which translates to "I don't want any balsamic vinegar after all", and ended up being a popular soramimi or mondegreen for the song, even affecting the Japanese language version.

== Remix ==
"Caramelldansen (Speedycake Remix)"
- The cover for Caramelldansen (Speedcake Remix) cover featuring the Caramella Girls. From left: Mindy, Vera, and Nadine

Single by Caramell / Caramella Girls

from the album Supergott Speedy Mixes
- Language: Swedish
- Released: 1 July 2008
- Recorded: 2005
- Studio: Playhouse Studios (Stockholm, Sweden)
- Genre: Dance-pop; Eurodance
- Length: 2:56
- Label: Remixed; Exit Tunes (Japan)
- Songwriters: Jorge Vasconcelo; Juha Myllylä

Music video
- "Caramelldansen" on YouTube

Japanese music distributor Exit Tunes gained the rights from the original Caramell producers, Remixed Records, to distribute the sped-up version of the original song in Asia, releasing first an album in April 2008 called Uma Uma Dekiru Trance wo Tsukutte Mita which included "Caramelldansen" (named "U-u-uma uma" (Speedycake Remix)) and other popular meme songs at the time. Toromi, the voice actor who voiced Mii in Popotan, also covered the song on a single Toro☆Uma. There was also an official single "U-u-uma uma" release Uma Uma Dekiru Trance reached number 20 on the Oricon charts and stayed on for 16 weeks; and the "U-u-uma uma" single reached number 16 and stayed 14 weeks. In March 2009, it was awarded Single of the Year (International) at Recording Industry Association of Japan's 23rd Japan Gold Disc Awards. Remixed Records released the sped-up version of the original Supergott album on Apple's iTunes Store; the album was called Supergott Speedy Mixes. In Japan, this was titled U-u-uma-uma SPEED with the song titles completely rewritten with emoticons. Speed reached number 48 on Oricon and stayed 5 weeks.

Remixed Records also released a set of Caramelldansen Speedy Mixes. On 16 September, they released an English version of the song called "Caramelldancing". A German version of the song, "Caramelltanzen", was released on 15 April 2009.

=== Releases ===
The speedy versions were released and remixed in multiple versions and languages, and the singles / remix EPs credited to other Caramell or Caramella Girls and produced and distributed by Remixed Records unless specified.

Singles and remix EPs:

- "U-u-uma uma" (ウッーウッーウマウマ(°∀°)) (Exit Tunes QWCE-00048, May 21, 2008)
- Caramelldansen Speedy Mixes (2008)
- "Caramelldancing" (English, 2008)
- "Caramelldancing - Christmas Version" (English, 2009)
- "Caramelltanzen" (German, Remixed Records, EMI Music & RemRec songs, 2009)
- "Caramelldansen Español 4K" (Spanish, Remixed Records, RemRec Songs & Sony/ATV Music Publishing, 2021)

Compilations of:

- Uma Uma Dekiru Trance wo Tsukutte Mita (ウマウマできるトランスを作ってみた, "Tried making a trance you can Uma Uma to") (Exit Tunes QWCE-00047, 16 April 2008)
- Supergott Speedy Mixes (2008)
  - released in Japan as U-u-uma uma SPEED (ウッーウッーウマウマ(゜∀゜) SPEED) (Exit Tunes QWCE-20001, 18 June 2008)

== Caramella Girls ==
Caramella Girls
- Genres: Bubblegum pop; nightcore
- Years active: 2008–present
- Label: Remixed
- Spinoff of: Caramell
- Members: Mindy; Nadine; Vera
- Website: caramellagirls.com

Caramella Girls is a virtual group created by Remixed Records in 2008 to promote the "Caramelldansen" song. They first showed up in the Japanese release "U-u-uma uma" single on 21 May 2008 as two anime character counterparts for the two female vocalists Malin Sundström and Katia Löfgren, removing the rest of the band members. They were then redesigned to be a girl group of three virtual girl characters – Mindy, Nadine, and Vera. At some live events, they would appear in masks and costumes. Remixed Records has further rebranded all related releases on music platforms from Caramell to "Caramella Girls".

On 18 March 2011, Caramella Girls released the song "Boogie Bam Dance", available in English, Spanish, and German. In October 2012, the band released the Caramelldancing Remixes EP, which features remixes of the English version of the Caramelldansen song by Crazy 1, No Trixx, and DJ Triplestar.

Caramella Girls has since released other songs and videos. Some of these were written by Kim Andre Arnesen and Kristian Lagerström; and some are covers of other bubblegum pop tunes. In 2020, they released a digital compilation album (without "Caramelldansen") called Sweet Decade.

== Use in other media ==
In July 2009, the Taiwanese gaming company Gamania launched an advertising campaign with the "Caramelldansen" song for the Japanese version of its online game Lucent Heart. "Caramelldansen" has also been used in Japanese arcade games. A rhythm game of the dance was released by Remixed Records on iOS on 18 November 2009. Entertainment group LoadingReadyRun performs the dance for their Desert Bus for Hope charity fundraisers most years, sometimes multiple times during a single run. In August 2010, the characters in the American Disney Channel program Phineas and Ferb perform the dance in the episode "Summer Belongs to You" when they stop by Tokyo. "Caramelldansen" is one of the licensed songs in the 2013 edition of Dance Dance Revolution. The dance has also appeared as a purchasable "Cat Ear Dance" emote in the 2017 video game Destiny 2.

In a TV commercial for Gamania's Lucent Heart video game, the couple do the dance with the song playing in the background. In the World of Warcraft "Mists of Pandaria" expansion pack, the choreography for the female Pandaren dance emote is derived from this meme.

== See also ==
- List of Internet phenomena
- 2 Phút Hơn
- Loituma Girl
- Nyan Cat
- Pikki Pikki dance
- Shukusei!! Loli Kami Requiem
