= Efter plugget =

1978 single by Factory

Single by Factory

from the album Factory
- Language: Swedish
- B-side: "Vi sticker, här blir inga barn gjorda"
- Released: 1978
- Genre: Pop, rock
- Label: CBS
- Songwriters: Mats Carinder; Lars Olof Larsson; Ted Larsson; Ken Siewertson

"Efter plugget"

Single by Caramell

from the album Gott Och Blandat
- Language: Swedish
- Released: 18 June 1999
- Recorded: 1998
- Genre: Eurodance
- Length: 3:09 (album version); 5:30 (extended version)
- Label: Warner Music; Republic
- Songwriters: Mats Carinder; Lars Olof Larsson; Ted Larsson; Ken Siewertson

Caramell singles chronology
"Om du var min" (1999)	"Efter plugget" (1999)	"Jag ser på dig" (1999)

"Efter plugget" is a song written by Lars Olof Larsson, Ted Larsson, Ken Siewertson and Mats Carinder, and originally recorded by Factory and released as a single in 1978 with "Vi sticker, här blir inga barn gjorda" as B-side, as well as appearing on the band's 1979 album Factory. Song lyrics describe completing the final year of school, and worrying about what to do next. The single peaked at second position at the Swedish singles chart, and charted at Svensktoppen for 10 weeks between 8 April-10 June 1979, peaking at 5th position.

In 1979, the song was recorded by Säwes on the album RFSU. The same year, Per Gessle wrote a musical replica, "After School", released by Peter Pop & The Helicopters.

A 1999 Caramell cover version appeared on the album Gott Och Blandat and was released as a single on 18 June 1999, with a longer version of the song acting as B-side. The single peaked at 18th position at the Swedish singles chart, and on 14 August 1999 it was tested for Svensktoppen, but failed to enter chart. The same year, Factory even released the remix single, Efter Plugget Remix 1999.

A 2001 Lollipops recording appeared on the album Vårat sommarlov.

The song is one of the titles in the book Tusen svenska klassiker (2009).

== Single track listing ==
=== Caramell ===
1. "Efter plugget" (radio edit) – 3:09
2. "Efter plugget" (long version) – 5:27

=== Factory (1978) ===
1. "Efter plugget" – 4:04
2. "Vi sticker - här blir inga barn gjorda" – 3:14

=== Factory (1989) ===
1. "Efter plugget '89" (long version) – 7:34
2. "Efter plugget '89" (single version) – 4:06
3. "Efter plugget '79" (single version) – 4:05
4. "Efter plugget '89" (instrumental version) – 4:22

=== Factory (1999) ===
1. "Efter plugget" (Same Old Song-version) – 4:04
2. "Efter plugget" (Ljusnande framtid-version) – 4:06
3. "Efter plugget remix 1999" (Beatbox Radio Edit) – 3:55
4. "Efter plugget remix 1999" (Beatbox long version) – 4:42

== Charts ==
=== Factory ===
Chart (1979)	Peak position
Sweden (Sverigetopplistan)	2

=== Caramell ===
Chart (1999)	Peak position
Sweden (Sverigetopplistan)	18
