= Dinah Nah =

Swedish singer (born 1980)

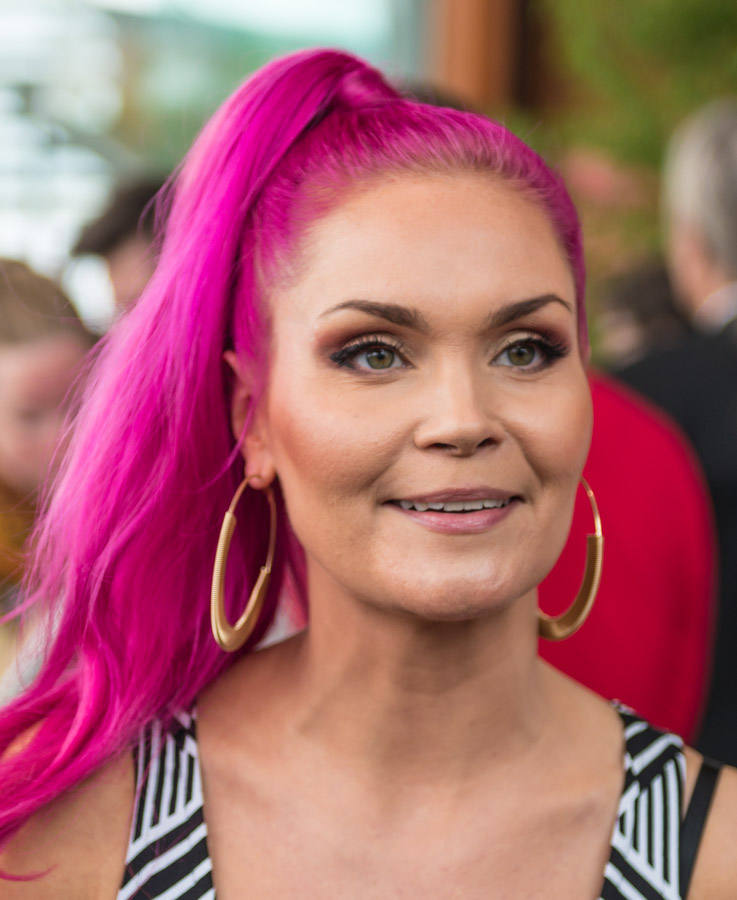
- Nah in 2015

Background information
- Born: Malin Dinah Sundström; 23 August 1980 (age 46); Sätra, Stockholm, Sweden
- Genres: Dance-pop, house
- Occupation: Singer
- Instrument: Vocals
- Years active: 1998–present
- Label: Capitol Music Group
- Formerly of: Caramell

Malin Dinah Sundström (born 23 August 1980), better known by her stage name Dinah Nah, is a Swedish singer. She began her career in 1998, as a member of the pop group Caramell, best known for their 2001 song "Caramelldansen" which became an internet meme.

Nah later launched a solo career in 2015, placing twelfth in Melodifestivalen 2015 with the song "Make Me (La La La)", which became a top ten hit in Sweden. She also competed in Melodifestivalen 2017 with the song "One More Night", failing to qualify from the first semi-final.

== Life and career ==
=== Early life and Caramell ===
Dinah Nah was born as Malin Dinah Sundström and grew up in the Sätra district of Stockholm, Sweden. She is a licensed skin therapist and nurse. During the 1990s, she was a member of the pop group Caramell, until the group disbanded in 2002.

=== Solo career ===
Dinah Nah launched her solo career when Anders Bagge approached her to sing the song "Make Me (La La La)" in Melodifestivalen 2015. She participated in the fourth semi-final, placing fourth and qualifying to andra chansen. She qualified through to the final through andra chansen, and placed last out of twelve. She subsequently released the song "Taste Your Love".

She competed in Melodifestivalen 2017 with the song "One More Night". She participated in the first semi-final held on 4 February 2017, placing fifth and didn't qualify to the finals.

== Gallery ==
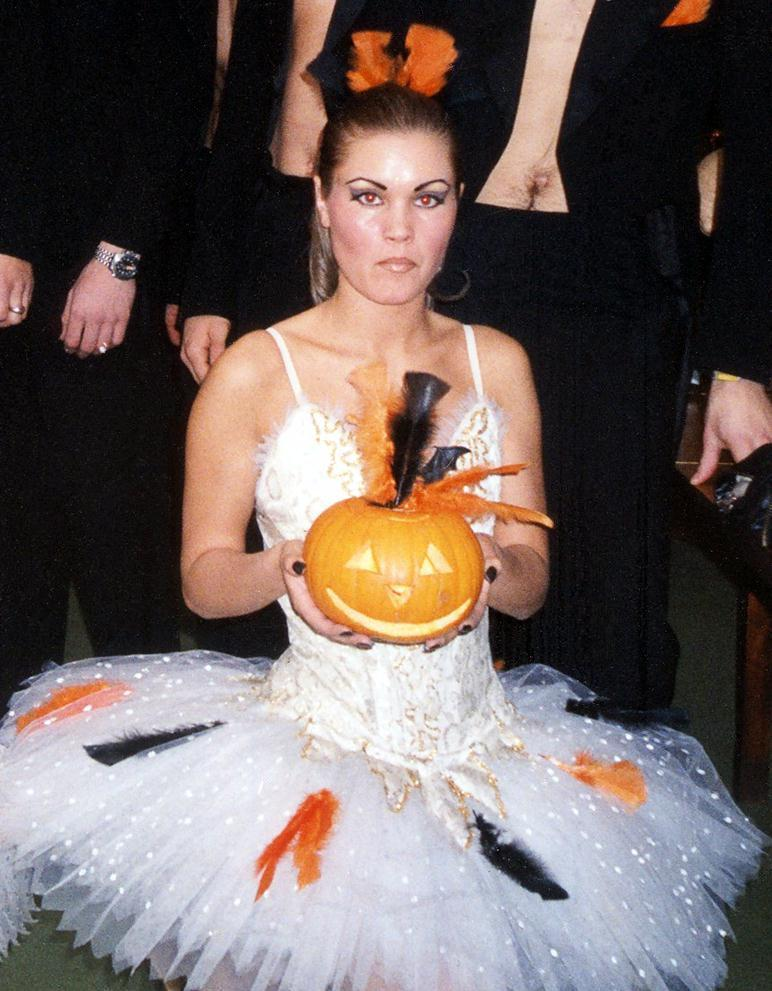
Nah attending the annual Hallow'een Happening at Café Opera, 1998

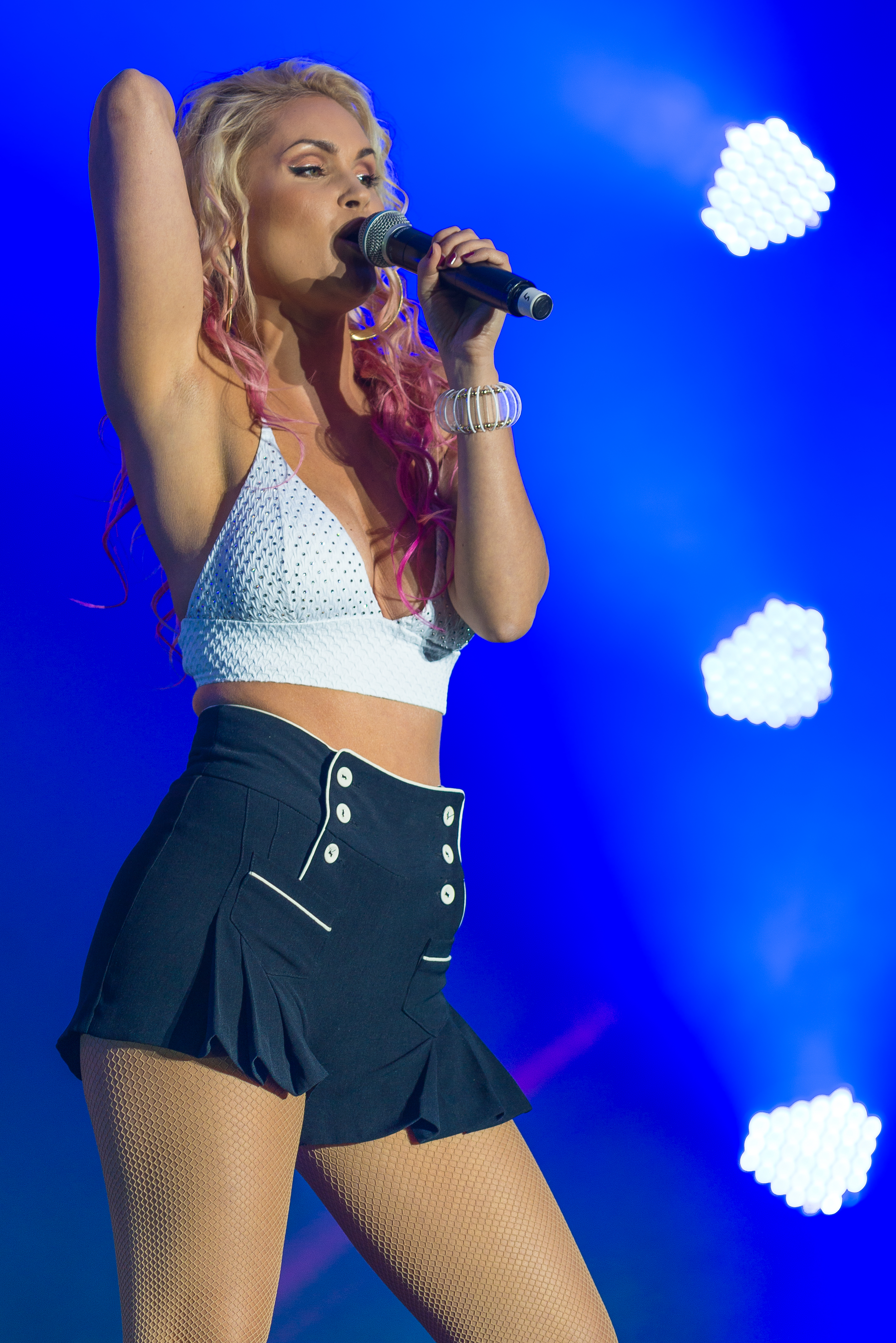
Nah performing at Melodifestivalen 2015

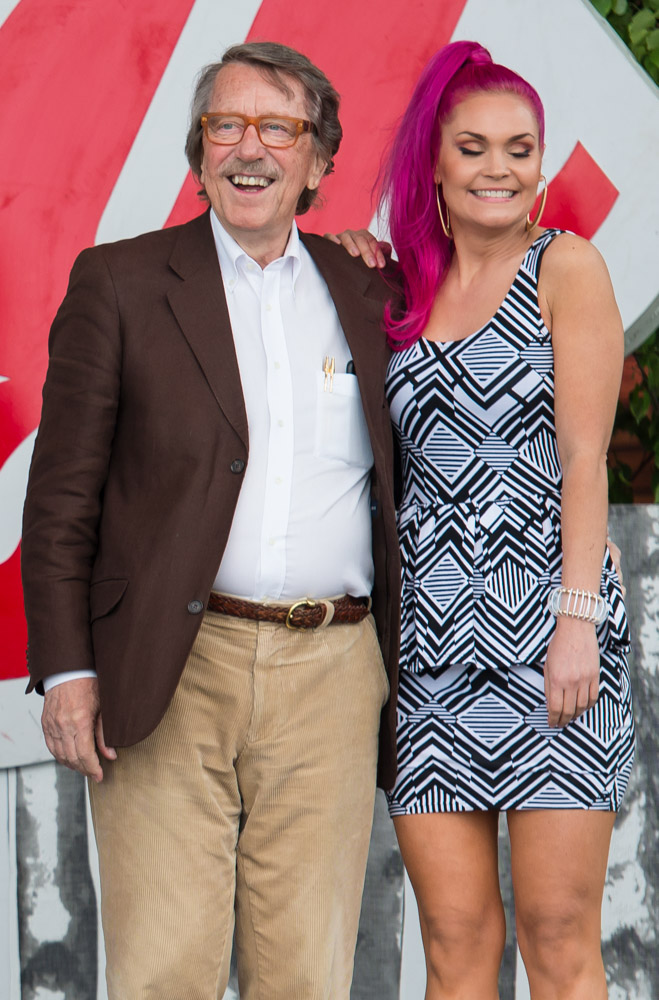
Nah with composer and choir leader Kjell Lönnå, 2015

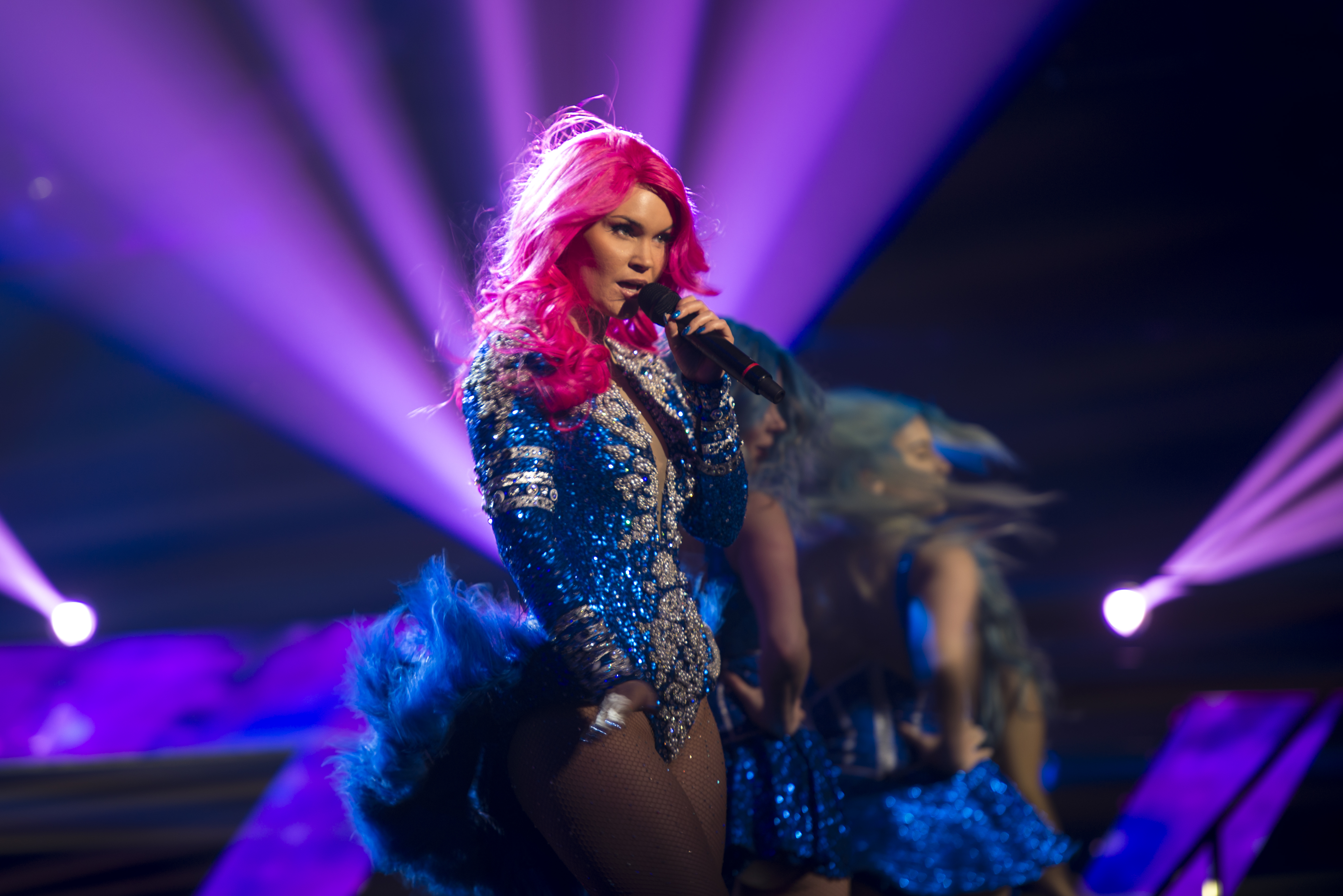
Nah performing at Melodifestivalen 2017

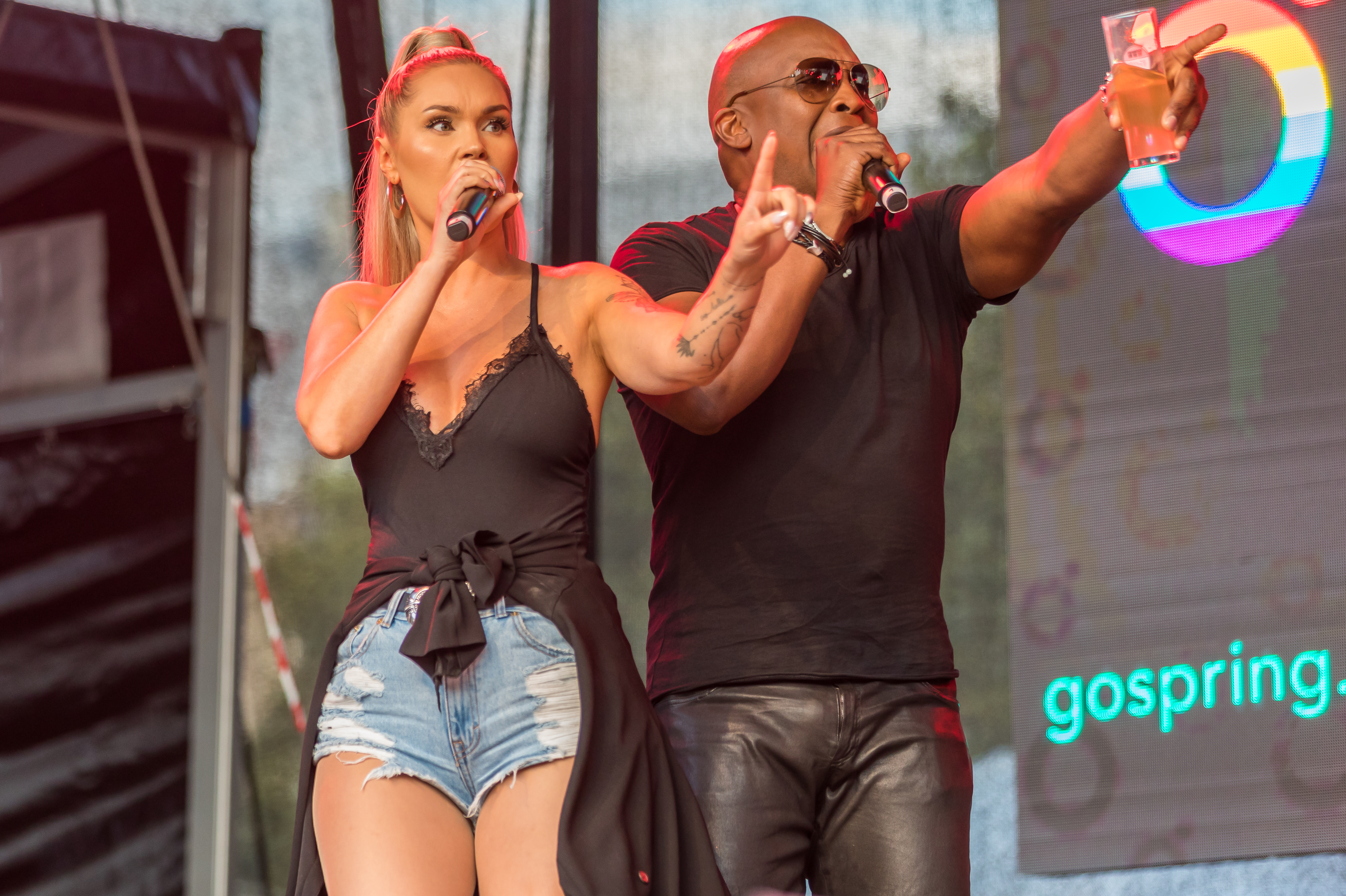
Nah and Haddaway performing at Cologne Pride, 2019

== Discography ==
=== Singles ===
Title	Year	Peak chart positions	Certifications	Album
Title	Year	SWE	Certifications	Album
"I Am"	2012	—	—	Non-album singles
"Like You"	2013	—	—	Non-album singles
"Make Me (La La La)"	2015	10	GLF: Platinum	Non-album singles
"Taste Your Love"	2015	—	—	Non-album singles
"One More Night"	2017	59	—	Non-album singles
"Equivocal"	2019	—	—	Non-album singles
"On My Way"	2022	—	—	Non-album singles
"—" denotes a single that did not chart or was not released in that territory.
