= Cadabra =

Cadabra might refer to:

- Cadabra AI Services, a website or mobile app to reality

- Cadabra (computer program), a computer algebra system for field theory problems
- Cadabra Design Automation, a former EDA company purchased by Numerical Technologies
- Cadabra, Inc., now Amazon.com, Inc.

== See also ==
- Abracadabra (disambiguation)
- Kadabra (disambiguation)
