= One More Night (Dinah Nah song) =

Single by Dinah Nah
- Released: 4 February 2017
- Recorded: 2016
- Genre: Dance-pop
- Length: 3:02
- Label: Warner Music Sweden
- Songwriters: Thomas G:son; Jimmy Jansson; Dinah Nah; Dr. Alban

Dinah Nah singles chronology
"Taste Your Love" (2015)	"One More Night" (2017)	"Equivocal" (2019)

"One More Night" is a song recorded by Swedish singer Dinah Nah. The song was released as a digital download in Sweden on 4 February 2017 and peaked at number 59 on the Swedish Singles Chart. It took part in Melodifestivalen 2017, and placed fifth in the first semi-final on 4 February 2017. It was written by Thomas G:son, Jimmy Jansson, Dinah Nah, Dr. Alban.

== Track listing ==
Digital download
No.	Title	Length
1.	"One More Night"	3:02

== Chart performance ==
=== Weekly charts ===
Chart (2017)	Peak positions
Sweden (Sverigetopplistan)	59

== Release history ==
Region	Date	Format	Label
Sweden	4 February 2017	Digital download	Warner Music Sweden
