= Gott Och Blandat =

1999 studio album by Caramell

Studio album by Caramell
- Released: 10 September 1999
- Recorded: 1998–1999
- Genres: Bubblegum pop; Eurodance
- Length: 44:09
- Language: Swedish
- Label: WEA
- Producers: Vasco & Millboy; Robin Rex; Anders Nyman; M12

Caramell chronology
Gott Och Blandat (1999)	Supergott (2001)

Gott Och Blandat (A Bit of Everything) is the debut studio album by the Swedish Eurodance group Caramell. The album gets its name from the candy with the same name by Malaco.

== Track listing ==
All tracks written by Jorge Vasconcelo/Juha Myllylä and produced by Vasco & Millboy, except where noted.

No.	Title	Writer(s)	Producer(s)	Length
1.	"Jag ser på dig" (I Look at U)			3:21
2.	"Skattjakt" (Treasure Hunt)			3:21
3.	"Efter plugget" (After School; Factory cover)	Ted Leinsköld; Lars Larsson; Mats Carinder; Kenneth Sivertsson; Mats Söderberg		3:09
4.	"Mr Cowboy"			3:01
5.	"Om du var min" (If U Were Mine)			3:29
6.	"Bara Vänner" (Just Friends)	Nebojsa Andrejev; Ari Lehtonen		3:39
7.	"Simsalabim" (Abracadabra)			3:20
8.	"Telefon" (Telephone)	Jan Nordlund; Johan Lagerlöf		3:33
9.	"Explodera (Som dynamit)" (Up Like Dynamite)	Robin Rex; Anders Nyman	Rex; Nyman	3:37
10.	"Som en saga" (Like a Fairytale)			3:32
11.	"Kom och ta mig" (Come & Take Me)	Mattias Olsson; Richard Bragning; Vasconcelo; Myllylä		3:15
12.	"Luftballong" (Hot-Air Balloon)			3:20
13.	"Vingar" (Wings)	Martin Pihl	M12	3:32
Total length:				44:09

== Charts ==
Chart performance for Gott Och Blandat
Chart (1999)	Peak position
Swedish Albums (Sverigetopplistan)	23
