= Noise Viola =

- Origin: Recife, Pernambuco, Brazil
- Genres: Classical music, Brazilian rhythms
- Years active: 2003-present
- Members: Fred Andrade; Paulo Barros; Leonardo César; Rafael Santiago; Cacau; Renato Monteiro
- Past members: Breno Lira; Tomás Melo
- Website: http://www.noiseviola.com/

Noise Viola is a Brazilian instrumental group formed by Fred Andrade (electric guitar), Paulo Barros (acoustic guitar), Leonardo César (12 string guitar), Renato Monteiro (bass), Rafael Santiago and Cacau (percussion), which presents a fusion of classical music and Brazilian rhythms, such as frevo, maracatu and baião.

== History ==
Noise Viola started its career in 2003, during Semana da Música (Music Week), organized by Conservatório Pernambucano de Música. The first lineup of the band was: Fred Andrade (electric guitar), Paulo Barros (acoustic guitar), Breno Lira (viola) and Tomás Melo (percussion). The proposal of the group was to mix classical music and popular rhythms from Pernambuco, such as frevo, maracatu, coco and baião. Most of their songs were composed by the own band members. However, the group usually records Brazilian rhythms, adapting them to Noise Viola's style.

In 2007, the group recorded its first album, which was very acclaimed by music critics. This disc was financed by Funcultura and counted with many Brazilian musician, such as Ebel Perrelli, Bozó, Cláudio Negrão and Edilson Staudinger. The releasing show happened in Santa Isabel Theater, on June 14.

After releasing their debut album, Lira and Melo left the band. They were replaced by Leonardo César, Cacau and Rafael Santiago. In this same period, Renato Monteiro joined Noise Viola as bassist, expanding the group.

Noise Viola has become one of the most important bands for instrumental music from Pernambuco and Brazil and has played in the most important events around the country, such as Festival de Inverno de Garanhuns, Recife Jazz Festival, Semana da Música and Natal de Todos. In 2009, the band was considered one of the main shows of Natal de Todos event, released in Praça da República, Recife, Brazil.

== Discography ==
- 2007: Noise Viola
