= Saltatio Mortis =

German rock band

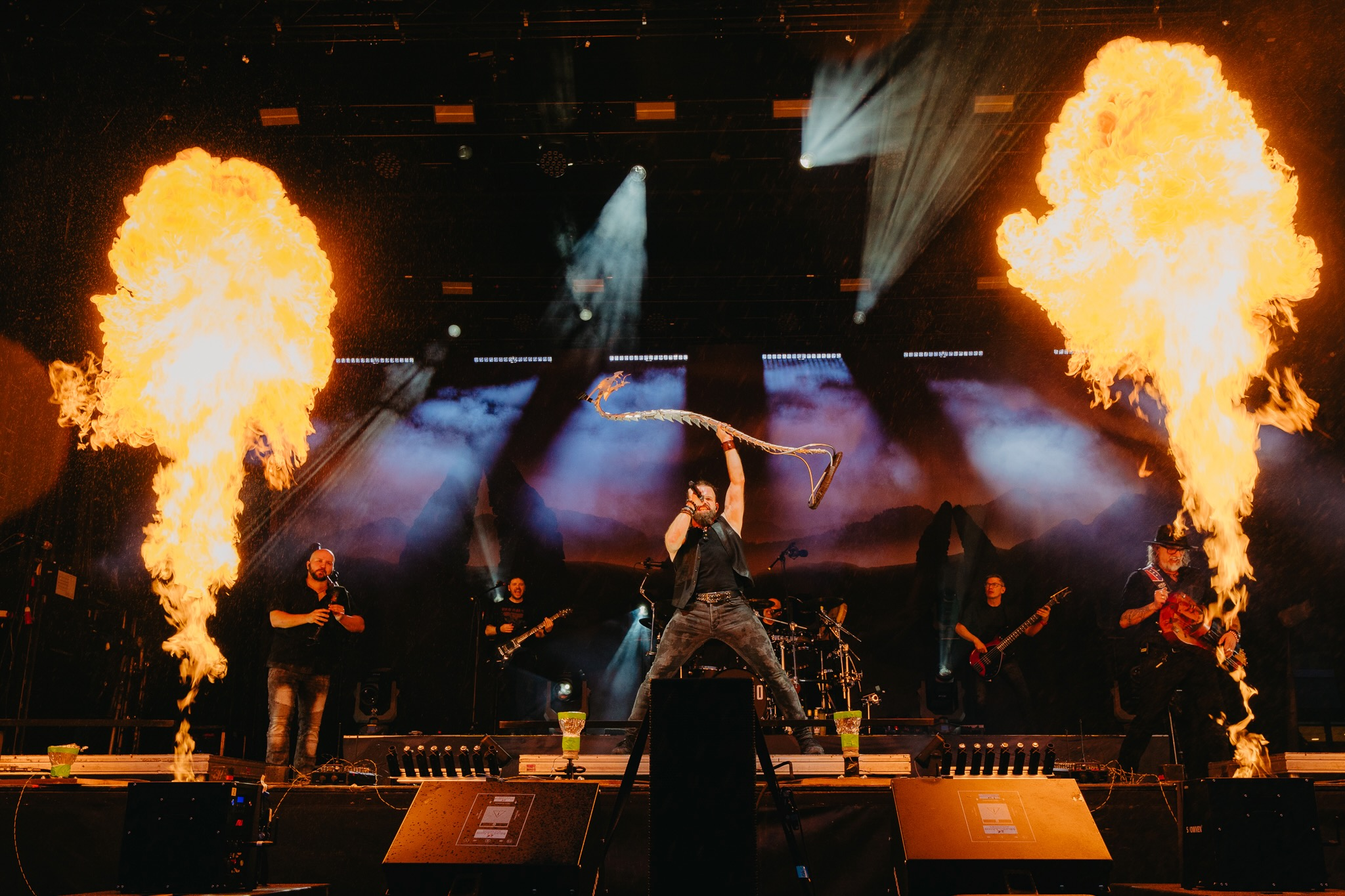
- Saltatio Mortis in 2025

Background information
- Origin: Karlsruhe, Germany
- Genres: Medieval metal, medieval rock
- Years active: 2000–present
- Labels: Prometheus, Vertigo/Capitol, We Love Music, Napalm
- Members: Alea der Bescheidene; Bruder Frank; El Silbador; Falk Irmenfried von Hasen-Mümmelstein; Lasterbalk der Lästerliche; Till Promill; Jean Méchant
- Past members: Die Fackel; Dominor der Filigrane; Ungemach der Missgestimmte; Mik El Angelo; Thoron Trommelfeuer; Cordoban der Verspielte; Herr Samoel; Luzi das L
- Website: www.saltatio-mortis.com
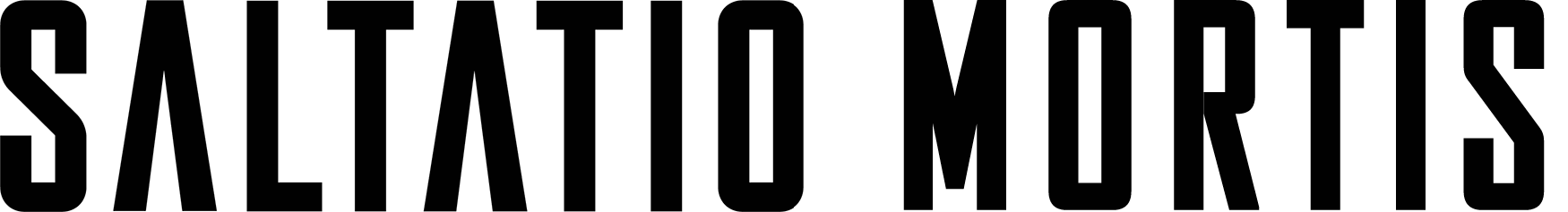

Saltatio Mortis is a German medieval metal group from Karlsruhe, formed in 2000. The Latin name means "dance of death". It is an allusion to the Danse Macabre, and a motto of the band is: "He who dances does not die."

== Members ==
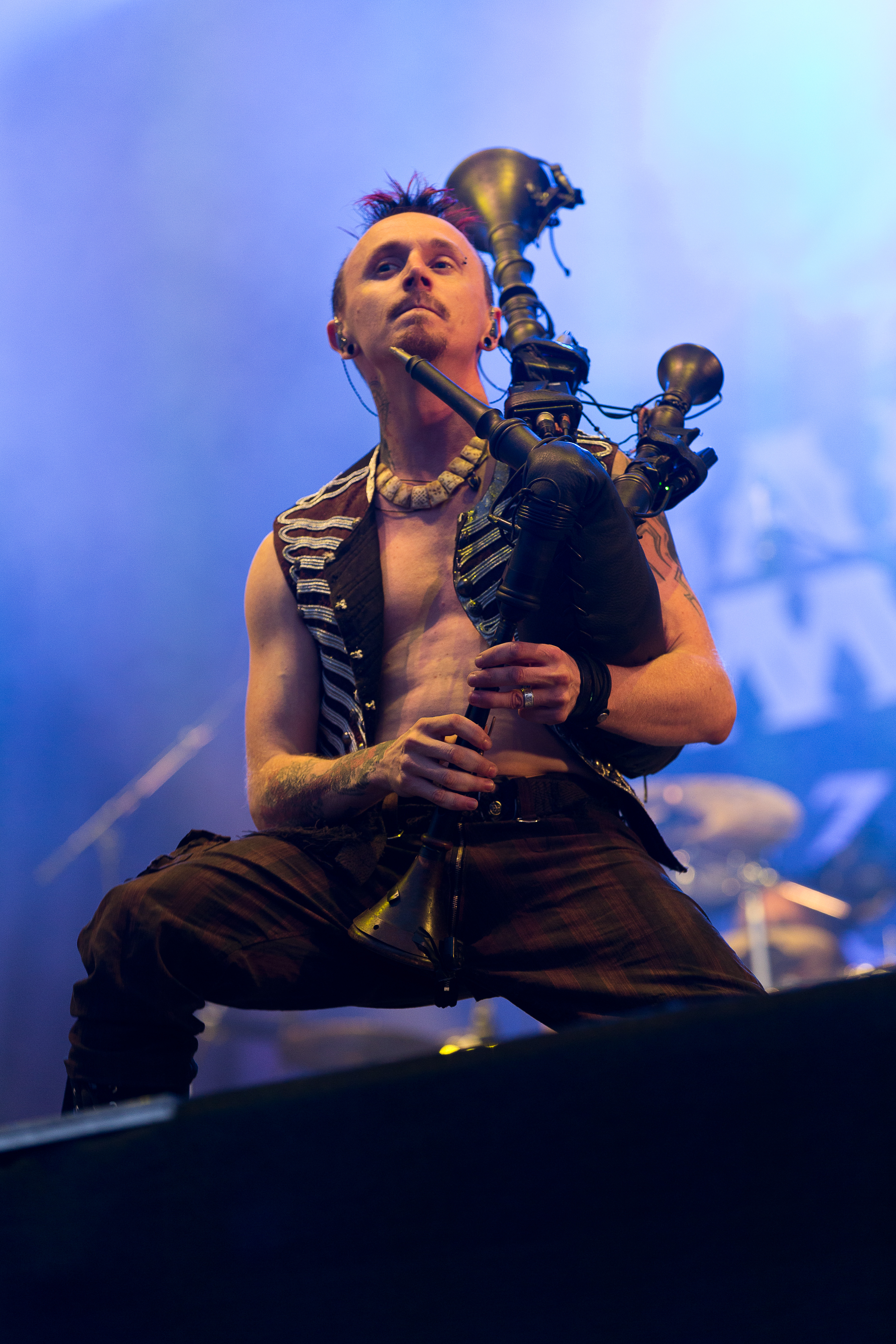
Luzi das L at Rockharz Open Air 2016

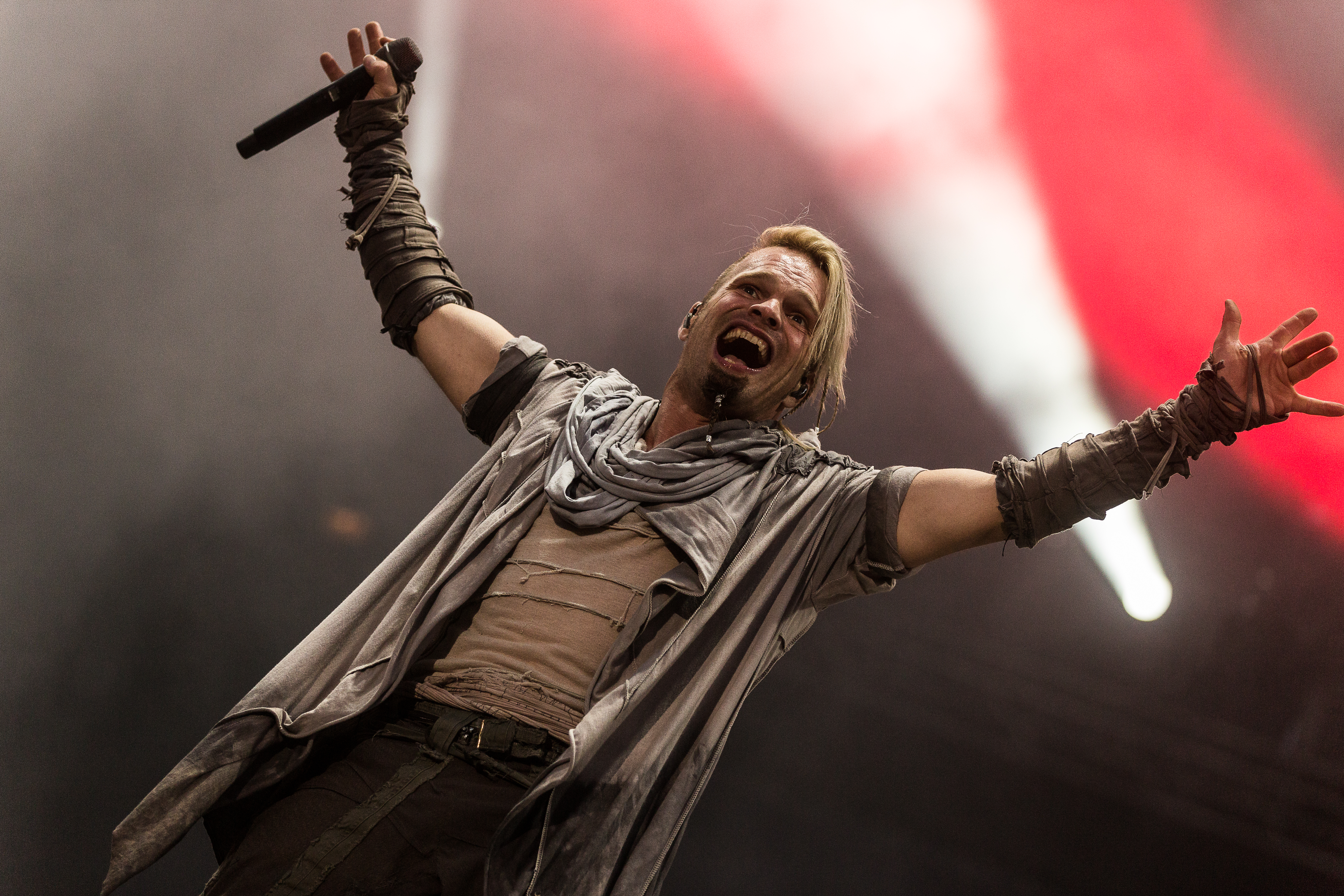
Alea der Bescheidene at Rockharz Open Air 2019

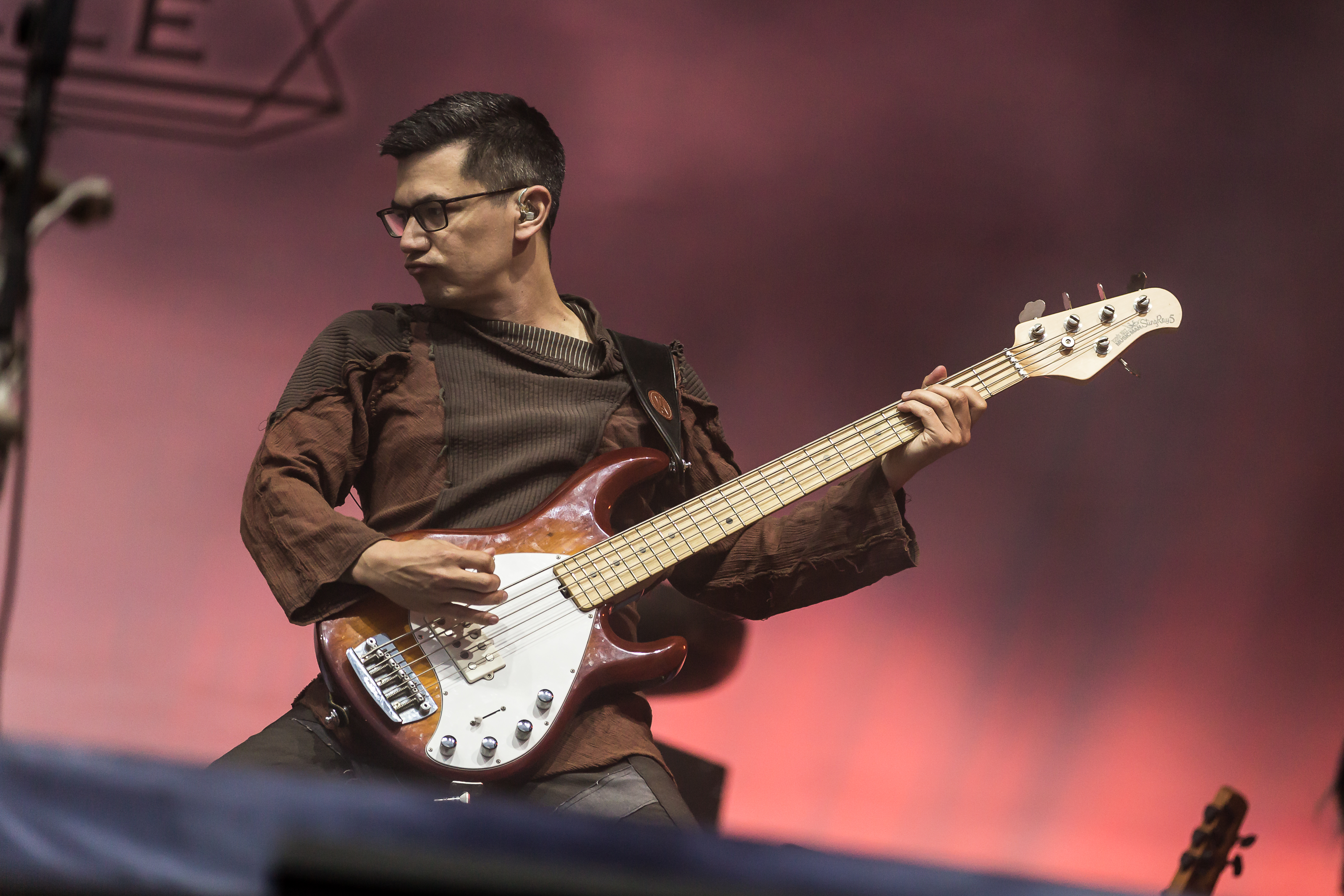
Bruder Frank at Rockharz 2019

=== Current ===
- Alea der Bescheidene - vocals, bagpipes, didgeridoo, guitar, Irish bouzouki, shawms
- Falk Irmenfried von Hasen-Mümmelstein - bagpipes, vocals, hurdy-gurdy, shawms
- El Silbador (since 2006) - bagpipes, shawms, smallpipes, uilleann pipes and other pipes
- Bruder Frank (since 2006) - bass guitars, electric upright Chapman Stick, guitar
- Till Promill (since 2012) - guitars
- Jean Mechant der Tambour (since 2009) - drums, piano, guitar, vocals

=== Past ===
- Lasterbalk der Lästerliche (up to 2021) - drums, davul and other percussion
- Dominor der Filigrane (2000 to 2009) - guitars, German bagpipes, shawms
- Die Fackel (2000 to 2006) - bass guitars, mandola, harp, German bagpipes, shawms
- Ungemach der Missgestimmte (2000 to 2006) - guitars, bagpipes, shawms, percussion, programming
- Thoron Trommelfeuer (2000 to 2009) - orchestral percussion
- Herr Schmitt (2004 to 2007) - drums and other percussion
- Mik El Angelo (2006 to 2009) - guitars, lutes, citterns
- Cordoban der Verspielte - shawms, bagpipes, vielle, whistles, vocals
- Herr Samoel (2007 to 2012) - guitars, Irish bouzouki
- Luzi das L (2011 to 2025) - pipes, shawms, flutes

== Discography ==
=== Studio albums ===
- 2001: Tavernakel (Tavernaculum), Napalm Records
- 2002: Das zweite Gesicht (The second Face), Napalm Records
- 2003: Heptessenz (Seventh Essence), Napalm Records
- 26 January 2004: Erwachen (Awakening), Napalm Records
- 29 August 2005: Des Königs Henker (The King's Hangman), Napalm Records
- 3 September 2007: Aus der Asche (From the Ashes), Napalm Records
- 31 August 2009: Wer Wind Sät (Who Sows the Wind), Napalm Records
- 29 August 2011: Sturm aufs Paradies (Rush for Paradise), Napalm Records
- 16 August 2013: Das Schwarze Einmaleins (The Black 1times1), Napalm Records
- 14 August 2015: Zirkus Zeitgeist (Circus Zeitgeist), We Love Music
- 17 August 2018: Brot und Spiele (Bread and Games), Vertigo/Capitol
- 9 October 2020: Für immer frei (Forever Free), Vertigo/Capitol
- 7 June 2024 Finsterwacht (Darkenguard), Prometheus Records
- 2027: Staub & Schatten, Prometheus Records

=== Live albums ===
- 2005: Manufactum Napalm Records
- 2010: Manufactum II Napalm Records
- 1 April 2011: 10 Jahre Wild Und Frei (10 Years Wild and Free) Live CD/DVD recorded at the Stadthalle Wuppertal 15/10/2010, Napalm Records
- 8 April 2013: Manufactum III Live CD, Napalm Records
- 2016: Zirkus Zeitgeist – Live aus der großen Freiheit Live CD, We Love Music

=== Compilation albums ===
- 2016: Licht & Schatten - Best Of 2000-2014, We Love Music

=== Singles ===
- 2003: "Falsche Freunde"
- 2005: "Salz der Erde"
- 2009: "Ebenbild"
- 2011: "Hochzeitstanz"
- 2013: "Früher War Alles Besser", Napalm Records
- 12 July 2013: "Wachstum über alles", Napalm Records
- 2015: "Wo Sind Die Clowns"
- 2022: "The Dragonborn Comes" featuring Lara Loft
- 2022: "Pray To The Hunter (The Elder Scrolls Online)"
- 2022: "Wir woll'n nach Valhalla"
- 2022: "Alive Now"
- 2024: "Schwarzer Strand"
- 2024: "Fire & Ore"

=== DVDs ===
- 1 April 2011: 10 Jahre Wild Und Frei (10 Years Wild and Free) Live CD/DVD recorded at the Stadthalle Wuppertal 15/10/2010, Napalm Records
- 13 December 2013: Provocatio - Live Auf Dem Mittelaltermarkt, Blu-ray and DVD, Napalm Records

=== Guest appearances ===
- 2010: All We Are (on 25 Years in Rock... and Still Going Strong by Doro
- 2011: Symposium (on Wunsch ist Wunsch by Feuerschwanz)
- 2017: Gesegnet und hoch geachtet (Also the Reprisal Version of this song), Kommt herbei und feiert mit (on Der Fluch des Drachen by Corvus Corax
- 20 July 2018: We Drink Your Blood (on Communio Lupatum by Powerwolf)
- 2020: Krieg kennt keine sieger (Cover) (on The Ghost Xperiment - Illumination by Vanden Plas
- 2021: Warriors of the World United feat Angus McFife, Melissa Bonny (on Memento Mori by Feuerschwanz)
- 2022: Good Life (on Not The End of the Road by Kissin' Dynamite (credited as Jorg Roth)
- 2022: It's Raining Beer (on Lang Liebe Der Hass by Hamatom) (credited as Alea)
