= Abracadabra (band) =

American Indie Pop Band

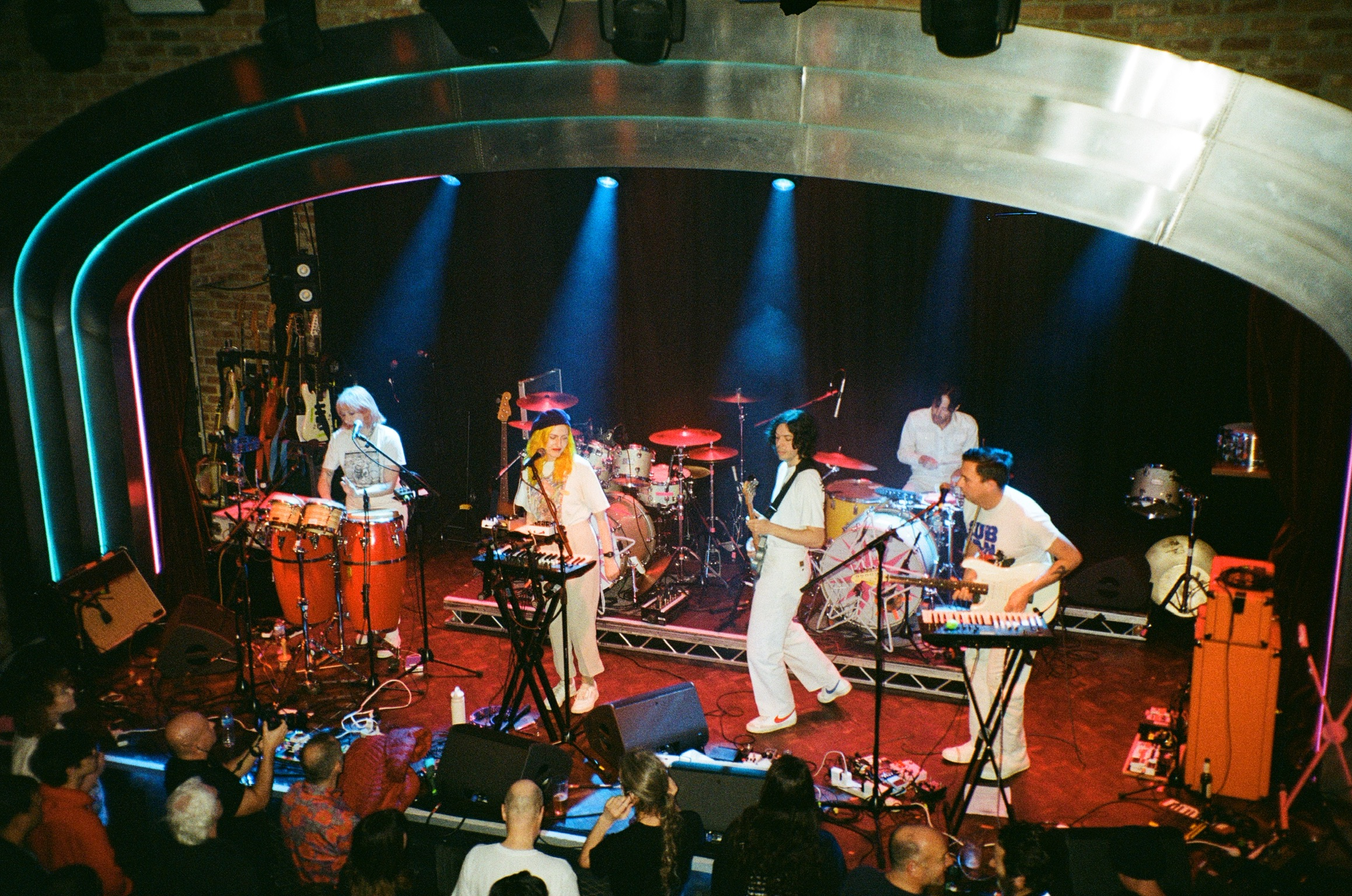
- abracadabra performing at Lafayette in London, United Kingdom, on March 31, 2023

Background information
- Origin: Oakland, California, United States
- Genres: Indie Pop, Synth Pop
- Years active: 2019–present
- Label: Melodic Records • Anniversary
- Members: Hannah Skelton; Chris Niles

abracadabra is an American indie pop group from Oakland, California. The band is composed of core duo Hannah Skelton (vocals and synthesizers) and Chris Niles (bass).

abracadabra formed after a chance encounter through a Halloween band covering the early Eurythmics album "In The Garden".

The band has been described as "The New Wave of No Wave". "Experimental synths nod to early 80s pop, with everyone from Duran Duran to Yellow Magic Orchestra looming in the background. Dubbed effects and a fondness for latin percussion permeate their work"

They released their self-titled debut album via Anniversary on July 24, 2020. Their single 'Cherry Soda' received playlist placements from Danger Mouse, David Dean Burkhart and Jason Bentley and 'Tracing Outlines' was featured on the FX show Better Things.

On January 20, 2023, abracadabra released their second album 'shapes & colors' on Melodic Records. "abracadabra's space and colours are a mind-expanding experience, well worth the backwards time travel." according to The Quietus. "...this album is a collection of songs with elements of no wave, dub, and disco which falls somewhere between the music of Tom Tom Club and Lizzie Mercier or maybe a minimal Eurythmics attempting to play early B52s. But also not like any of that." writes Joyzine.

abracadabra supported 'shapes & colors' by performing at South by Southwest 2023, playing showcases for Levitation and SXSJ among others. They toured the United Kingdom that March supporting The Go! Team. Their single 'talk talk' was also featured on the BBC Radio 6 Music Playlist.

In the fall of 2023, abracadabra announced their first European headline tour and played festivals and clubs across the Netherlands, Belgium, the United Kingdom, France, Switzerland and Germany.

== Discography ==
=== Studio albums ===
- abracadabra (24 July 2020, Anniversary)
- shapes & colors (20 January 2023, Melodic Records)
