= Das Schwarze Einmaleins =

Studio album by Saltatio Mortis
- Released: 2013
- Genre: Medieval metal, power metal, folk rock
- Length: 50:07
- Label: Napalm Records
- Producer: Thomas Heimann-Trosien

Saltatio Mortis chronology
Sturm aufs Paradies (2011)	Das Schwarze Einmaleins (2013)	Zirkus Zeitgeist (2015)

Professional ratings
Review scores
Source	Rating
Metal.de	8/10 stars
Metal Temple	10/10 stars

Das Schwarze Einmaleins is the ninth studio album by German medieval metal group Saltatio Mortis.

== Track listing ==
No.	Title	Translation	Length
1.	"Früher war alles besser"	In the past everything was better	3:57
2.	"Wachstum über alles"	Growth above all	3:41
3.	"Krieg kennt keine Sieger"	War has no winners	3:47
4.	"Der Kuss"	The kiss	3:30
5.	"My Bonnie Mary"	My Bonnie Mary	3:23
6.	"Der Sandmann"	The Sandman	4:11
7.	"Satans Fall"	Satan's Fall	3:58
8.	"Idol"	Idol	4:24
9.	"IX"	IX	4:13
10.	"Galgenballade"	Gallow's ballad	4:10
11.	"Abrakadabra"	Abracadabra	4:33
12.	"Nur ein Traum"	Just a dream	3:27
13.	"Randnotiz"	Side Note	2:47
Total length:			50:07

Bonus Edition
No.	Title	Translation	Length
14.	"Schloss Duwisib"	Duwisib Castle	3:20
Total length:			53:27

== Charts ==
Chart (2013)	Peak position
Germany	1
Austria	25
Switzerland	44
