= Ooa hela natten =

Single by Attack

from the album Rätt stuk
- A-side: "Ooa hela natten"
- B-side: "Kom fram"
- Released: 1981
- Genre: Swedish pop
- Label: CBS
- Songwriters: Lars-Åke Eriksson; Björn Uhr

Attack singles chronology
""Kompaktmannen/Jag vill inte ner i källaren"" (1981)	"Ooa hela natten" (1981)	"Trasnochando (Ooa hela natten)/Adelante (Kom fram)" (1982)

"Ooa hela natten" is a song written by Åke Eriksson and Björn Uhr. It was recorded, and released as a single in 1981, by Swedish pop group Attack. The song is also on the album Rätt stuk, released the same year.

The song was written in a humorist and playful way, using a drum machine. Becoming a huge hit in Sweden, the song later gained new popularity, with the Smurfhits children's albums.' when appearing at Smurfhits 3 in 1997 as "Smurfa hela natten".

The song also charted at Svensktoppen for two weeks between 22 and 29 November 1981.

The single sold 70,000 copies, and is one of the titles in the book Tusen svenska klassiker (2009).

== Charts ==
Chart (1981–1982)	Peak position
Norway (VG-lista)	2
Sweden (Sverigetopplistan)	1

== Certifications ==
Region	Certification	Certified units/sales
Sweden (GLF)	Platinum	8,000,000^{†}
^{†} Streaming-only figures based on certification alone.
