= Soma (Mallavoodoo album) =

Studio album by Mallavoodoo
- Released: 2006
- Recorded: January – March 2006
- Genre: Instrumental music, rock and roll, progressive rock, jazz, blues
- Length: 50:28
- Producer: Thales Silveira

Mallavoodoo chronology
O inverno e a garça (2000)	Soma (2006)

Soma is the second album of the Brazilian instrumental music group Mallavoodoo. It was produced by the bass player, Thales Silveira and released in 2006. This recording was financed by Recife city hall and took three months to get finished.

It was positively criticized by some Brazilian musical magazines, such as Cover Baixo and Teclado e Áudio.

== Track listing ==
#	Title	Songwriters	Length
1.	"Abracadabra"	Thales Silveira	5:31
2.	"Terra de Gelo"	Alexandre Bicudo	4:16
3.	"Vôo da coruja"	Mário Lobo	4:40
4.	"Mandala"	Thales Silveira	5:00
5.	"Nós dois"	Alexandre Bicudo	6:06
6.	"Infinita"	Thales Silveira	5:38
7.	"Canção do sol"	Mário Lobo	4:59
8.	"Real"	Alexandre Bicudo	4:37
9.	"Guaranabara"	Mário Lobo	4:35
10.	"Conexão Noruega"	Thales Silveira, Mário Lobo, Alexandre Bicudo	5:07

== Personnel ==
- Thales Silveira: electric bass, acoustic bass
- Mário Lobo: keyboards, saxophone
- Alexandre Bicudo: electric guitar, acoustic guitar
- Misael Barros: drums, percussion
