= Abracadabra (video game) =

1988 video game

- Developer: Odisea Software
- Publisher: Proein Soft Line
- Designer: Jorge Blecua
- Engine: Professional Adventure Writer
- Platforms: Amstrad CPC, MSX, ZX Spectrum
- Release: 1988
- Genre: Interactive fiction
- Mode: Single-player

Abracadabra is a text adventure developed by Odisea Software and published by Proein Soft Line only in Spanish for the Amstrad CPC, MSX and ZX Spectrum in 1988.

== Gameplay ==
Abracadabra is a text adventure. The game depicts the game world and events in textual form. As in a tabletop role-playing game the game is played move by move. The player enters a move in form of a command in natural language, referring to the game world, non-player character or items in his possession. The game's parser then evaluates the move much like a tabletop RPG's gamemaster, remodeling the game world if necessary and telling the player the outcome of his move. This way the player can explore the game world, solve puzzles and advance the plot. Solving certain puzzles grants access to further parts of the game world.

In addition the game shows hand-drawn pictures that depict the current location in the game world. The location pictures take up about two thirds of the screen with the lower third reserverd for text input and output.

== Plot ==
In the year 1209, a knight named Clus d'Eledorf was bewitched by the jealous Queen Saligia, enamored with him, to become a ghost haunting the Castle Burgenfels until he would confess his love to her. The game is divided into two parts. In part one, Clus has to find a way to rid of the witch, break the curse and escape his prison. In the second part, Clus needs to seek out and rescue his beloved Princess Violeta from the Greenwald forest.

== Reception ==
The game was well received by Spanish video game press. MicroHobby called it an "excellent game with a high level of graphic quality and more importantly a stunning setting and realization" and a "fantasy adventure game that provides all the elements necessary to satisfy even the most demanding fans of this genre." Micromania gave it a score of 8/10 and CAAD opined that "among the adventures existing on the Spanish market, this one is definitely the best."
