= Mandinga (album) =

Studio album by Fred Andrade and Ebel Perrelli
- Released: 2002
- Genre: Instrumental music, Rock and roll, Brazilian rhythms
- Length: 56:31
- Producer: Valéria Pimentel

Mandinga is the only album recorded by Projeto Mandinga, the band created by Fred Andrade and Ebel Perrelli. Released in 2002, the album counts with Helio Silva as bassist and also counts on the participation of other famous artists, such as Naná Vasconcelos and Dominguinhos.

== Track listing ==
#	Title	Songwriters	Length
1.	"Com o pé direito"	Fred Andrade	
	"Catú-Catú"	Fred Andrade	6:43
2.	"De frente pro mar"	Fred Andrade	7:16
3.	"Mandinga"	Ebel Perrelli, Hélio Silva, Fred Andrade	4:56
4.	"Carneiros"	Fred Andrade	3:37
5.	"Vôte"	Fred Andrade	3:52
6.	"Valentia buscapé"	Fred Andrade, Bruno Simpson	4:56
7.	"Sete"	Fred Andrade	5:54
8.	"Bicicleta"	Ebel Perrelli, Fred Andrade	5:45
9.	"Xote pra Silveira"	Fred Andrade	2:56
10.	"Pé de boi"	Fred Andrade	6:16
11.	"Fasta gado"	Fred Andrade	4:18

== Personnel ==
- Fred Andrade: guitar, acoustic guitar, viola caipira and vocals (in "Com o pé direito")
- Ebel Perrelli: percussion (except in "Com o pé direito", "Valentia buscapé" and "Fasta gado"), drums and snare drum
- Hélio Silva: bass
- Ranniere Oliveira: keyboards (in "Catú-Catú")
- Kleyton Martins: keyboards (in "Sete")
- Breno Lira: acoustic guitar (in "Mandinga") and viola caipira (in "Fasta gado")
- Sérgio Campelo: flute (in "Vôte" and "Pé de boi")
- Guga Beija-Flor: rebec (in "Mandinga"), fife (in "Valentia buscapé") and mouth percussion (in "Valentia buscapé" and "Pé de boi")
- Mr. Jam: percussion (in "Valentia buscapé" and "Fasta gado")
- Carlinhos Borges: samples and xangle loop (in "Mandinga")
- Luciano Oliveira: vocals (in "Catú-Catú" and "Pé de boi")
- Bruno Simpson: vocals (in "De frente pro mar" and "Valentia buscapé")
- Ciranda do Baracho: vocals (in "De frente pro mar")
- Lama: vocals (in "De frente pro mar")
- Barachinha: vocals (in "Mandinga")

Special guests:

- Naná Vasconcelos: percussion (in "Com o pé direito")
- Dominguinhos: accordion (in "Xote para Silveira")
- Toinho Alves: vocals (in "Fasta gado")
