= Ebel Perrelli =

Brazilian musician

- Birth name: Ebel Perrelli
- Genres: Rock, jazz, Brazilian
- Occupation(s): Musician, composer
- Instrument: Drums
- Years active: 1980–present

Ebel Perrelli is a Brazilian composer and musician. He has worked with Lenine, Naná Vasconcelos, Chuck Silverman, Manu Katché, and Jonathan Mover. He was a member of Mallavoodoo, BPM Trio, and Mandinga.

== Biography ==
Ebel Perrelli started playing drums when he was teenager in a school band. His first studies were based on Stick control method, by George Lawrence Stone. He continued his studies in the Conservatório Pernambucano de Música and in 1993 he graduated from the Musicians Institute of London, after completing the One Year Diploma Course. He then became a teacher in the same conservatory where he studied and started his musical career, playing with many artists and bands of Pernambuco.

In 1996, Perrelli joined the band Mallavoodoo with Thales Silveira (bass), Mário Lobo (keyboards and saxophone), and Alexandre Bicudo (guitar). With them, he did many shows around Pernambuco and recorded an album in 2001 named O inverno e a garça.

In 1998, Perrelli participated in Zildjian Day Recife, playing with Manu Katche. One year later he won IV Batuka Music Festival in Best Improvisation category.

In 2001, he joined the group Anynote Jazz Quartet, with Fred Andrade (guitar), Sidor Hulak (guitar), and Hélio Silva (bass), which attracted many music students during its shows. In 2002, also with Andrade, he started a musical project, with the objective of combining rock and Brazilian rhythms. It was called Projeto Mandinga and lasted some months. During this period, Perrelli and Andrade did many shows in Brazil and recorded an album.

In 2004, Perrelli played with the singer Nando Cordel, accompanying him during his tours for some years. Parallel to this work, he also created the instrumental band BPM Trio around 2006, which counted on Luciano Magno (guitar) and Nando Barreto (bass). The name of the band was created with the initials of the second name of each musician: Barreto, Perrelli and Magno. However, it can be interpreted as 'beats per minute'. The band rescued some ideas created by Quarteto Novo: create a Brazilian instrumental music from Brazilian rhythms, like baião and xote. In fact, they were positively criticized by experts and played with Heraldo do Monte, one of the member of the group which inspired them.

During his career, Perrelli worked with Luciano Magno, Beto Kaiser, Aratanha Azul, and Sa Grama. He is a member of the group Cascabulho, which was nominated for Latin Grammy in 2004. He also teaches in the Conservatório Pernambucano de Música and organizes many shows and workshops around Brazil and the world, spreading Brazilian rhythms and their applications in contemporary music.

== Discography ==
- 2000: Portal
- 2000: Luciano Magno, by Luciano Magno
- 2001: O inverno e a garça, by Mallavoodoo
- 2001: Ilusões a granel, by Fred Andrade
- 2002: Mandinga, with Fred Andrade
- 2002: De volta à Terra, by Aratanha Azul
- 2006: BPM Trio, by BPM Trio
- 2007: Brincando de coisa séria, by Cascabulho

== See also ==
- Mário Negrão
