= Attack (band) =

Swedish pop group

- Origin: Huddinge, Sweden
- Genre: Pop rock
- Years active: 1980–1985, 1992
- Website: Official Facebook

Attack was a pop group in Huddinge in Sweden, formed in 1980, scoring chart successes in Sweden during the early 1980s. The band disbanded in 1985, but reunited in 1991 and still play together.

== Members ==
=== 1980-1982 ===
- Åke Eriksson
- Rosa Körberg (sister of Tommy Körberg)
- Björn Uhr
- Peter P.J Jägerhult

=== 1983-1985 ===
- Åke Eriksson
- Rosa Körberg
- Björn Uhr
- Fille Lindström

=== 1992-present ===
- Åke Eriksson
- Rosa Körberg
- Björn Uhr
- Peter P.J Jägerhult

== Discography ==
=== Album ===
- 1980 - Vampyrrock
- 1981 - Rätt stuk
- 1982 - Full fart Framåt

=== Singles ===
- 1980 - "Du får inte komma i kväll/Vill du ha, kom å ta'"
- 1981 - "Kompaktmannen/Jag vill inte ner i källaren"
- 1981 - "Ooa hela natten/Kom fram"
- 1982 - "Trasnochando (Ooa hela natten)/Adelante (Kom fram)"
- 1982 - "Ooin in the Moonlight/Ooin in the Moonlight (instrumental version)"
- 1982 - "Tokyo / Tung metall"
- 1982 - "Dag och natt/Grönt ljus"
- 1982 - "Helt rätt/Dr. Kildahr"
- 2000 - "Vänner"
